= Deaths in February 2023 =

The following is a list of notable deaths in February 2023.

Entries for each day are listed alphabetically by surname. A typical entry lists information in the following sequence:

- Name, age, country of citizenship at birth, subsequent country of citizenship (if applicable), reason for notability, cause of death (if known), and reference.

== February 2023 ==
=== 1 ===
- Angel Alcala, 93, Filipino biologist, president of Silliman University (1991–1992), secretary of environment and natural resources (1992–1995) and chairperson of the CHED (1995–1999).
- Hans Alsén, 96, Swedish politician, MP (1974–1982), governor of Uppsala County (1986–1992).
- Renato Benaglia, 84, Italian football player (Fiorentina, Catania, Roma) and coach.
- Joanne Bracker, 77, American Hall of Fame college basketball coach (Midland University), cancer.
- Don Bramlett, 60, American football player (Minnesota Vikings).
- Jozef Čapla, 84, Slovak ice hockey player (HC Slovan Bratislava, HC Dukla Jihlava, Augsburger EV).
- Parimal Dey, 81, Indian footballer (East Bengal FC, Mohun Bagan AC, national team).
- Terence Dickinson, 79, Canadian astrophotographer and amateur astronomer, complications from Parkinson's disease.
- Benny Dollo, 72, Indonesian football manager (Persita Tangerang, Arema Malang, national team).
- Eunice Dwumfour, 30, American politician, shot.
- Franklin Florence, 88, American civil rights activist.
- Billy Galligan, 86, Irish hurler (Avondhu, Blackrock, Cork).
- Kit Hesketh-Harvey, 65, British comedian and screenwriter (Maurice).
- Jennifer Johnson, 76, Trinidad and Tobago politician.
- Maria Mykolaichuk, 81, Ukrainian singer and actress, People's Artist of Ukraine.
- Roland Muhlen, 82, American Olympic sprint canoer (1972, 1976).
- Leonard Pietraszak, 86, Polish actor (Vabank, Danton, Kingsajz).
- Phillip Price Jr., 88, American politician.
- Lucy Quintero, 74, Panamanian folk singer, heart attack.
- Terry Saldaña, 64, Filipino basketball player (Barangay Ginebra San Miguel, Pop Cola Panthers, Shell Turbo Chargers), kidney disease.
- René Schérer, 100, French philosopher.
- Matthew Schure, 74, American educational psychologist.
- Dan Suleiman, 80, Nigerian air force officer and politician, governor of Plateau State (1976–1978).
- Philippe Tesson, 94, French journalist (Le Quotidien de Paris, Combat).
- Roman L. Weil, 82, American economist, cancer.
- George P. Wilbur, 81, American actor (Halloween, Remote Control, The Running Man) and stuntman.
- Stanley Wilson Jr., 40, American football player (Detroit Lions).
- George Zukerman, 95, Canadian bassoonist.

=== 2 ===
- Don Bielke, 90, American basketball player (Fort Wayne Pistons).
- Trevor Boys, 65, Canadian racecar driver (NASCAR).
- Ron Campbell, 82, American baseball player (Chicago Cubs).
- Enzo Carra, 79, Italian journalist and politician, deputy (2001–2013).
- Chris Chesser, 74, American film producer (Major League, The Rundown, Bad Day on the Block).
- Calton Coffie, 68, Jamaican vocalist (Inner Circle).
- Marcel Duriez, 82, French Olympic hurdler (1960, 1964, 1968).
- Peter Facklam, 92, Swiss politician, member of the Executive Council of Basel-Stadt (1980–1992).
- Fred la marmotte, Canadian groundhog.
- George Hams, 94, Australian footballer (Collingwood).
- Gerardo Islas Maldonado, 39, Mexican businessman and politician, member of the Congress of Puebla (2018–2021), heart attack.
- Jean-Pierre Jabouille, 80, French racing driver (Formula One, 24 Hours of Le Mans).
- Kenny Jay, 85, American professional wrestler (AWA).
- Glória Maria, 73, Brazilian journalist and reporter (Fantástico, Globo Repórter), cancer.
- Linda Matar, 97, Lebanese women's rights activist.
- Butch Miles, 78, American jazz drummer.
- Mohammed Saeed Al Mulla, 97, Emirati banker and politician, co-founder of the National Bank of Dubai, minister of state for federation and Gulf affairs (1971–1973) and transport (1973–1997).
- Dennis Munari, 74, Australian footballer (Carlton, North Melbourne).
- Roger Nolan, 83, American police officer.
- Robert Orben, 95, American comedian and speechwriter.
- Solomon Perel, 97, German-born Israeli author and motivational speaker (Europa Europa).
- Lanny Poffo, 68, Canadian-American professional wrestler (WWF, CWA, ICW), heart failure.
- Tim Quy, 61, British musician (Cardiacs).
- Pete Reed, 33, American aid worker, shell explosion.
- Kenneth D. Scott, 92, American politician, member of the Iowa Senate (1973–1977, 1987–1991).
- D. R. Thorpe, 79, British historian and biographer.
- Louis Velle, 96, French actor (Stopover in Orly, The Impossible Mr. Pipelet, Kings for a Day).
- K. Viswanath, 92, Indian film director (Sankarabharanam, Sagara Sangamam, Saptapadi).
- Barbara Wilk, 87, Polish gymnast, Olympic bronze medallist (1956).
- James C. Wofford, 78, American equestrian, Olympic silver medalist (1968, 1972).
- Richard Woolcott, 95, Australian diplomat, author and commentator, permanent representative to the United Nations (1982–1988).
- Takahiro Yokomichi, 82, Japanese politician, twice member and speaker (2009–2012) of the House of Representatives, governor of Hokkaido (1983–1995), cancer.
- John Zizioulas, 92, Greek Orthodox prelate, metropolitan of Pergamon (since 1986), COVID-19.

=== 3 ===
- Bernard Bardin, 88, French politician, deputy (1981–1993).
- Giuseppina Bersani, 73, Italian Olympic fencer (1972).
- Ronald Enroth, 84, American sociologist and author.
- Anthony Fernandes, 86, Indian Roman Catholic prelate, bishop of Bareilly (1989–2014), multiple organ failure.
- Andreas Gielchen, 58, German footballer (1. FC Köln, Alemannia Aachen).
- Oswald Gomis, 90, Sri Lankan Roman Catholic prelate and academic administrator, auxiliary bishop (1968–1996) and archbishop (2002–2009) of Colombo, chancellor of the UoC (2002–2021).
- Robert Key, 77, English politician, MP (1983–2010) and minister for sport (1992–1993).
- Alain Lacouchie, 76, French poet, illustrator, and photographer.
- José Luiz de Magalhães Lins, 93, Brazilian banker.
- Lawrence M. McKenna, 89, American jurist, judge of the U.S. District Court for Southern New York (since 1990).
- Ronald Meisburg, 75, American labor lawyer.
- Hiroshi Mizuta, 103, Japanese economist and historian, member of the Japan Academy.
- Ken Monteith, 84, Canadian politician, MP (1988–1993).
- Joan Oates, 94, American-British archaeologist and academic.
- Roberto Purini, 85, Brazilian lawyer and politician, São Paulo MLA (1979–1999).
- Paco Rabanne, 88, Spanish fashion designer.
- Portia Robinson, 96, Australian historian.
- Bine Rogelj, 93, Slovene Olympic ski jumper (1956) and caricaturist.
- Sergio Solli, 78, Italian actor (Il mistero di Bellavista, I Can Quit Whenever I Want, Ciao, Professore!).
- Dante Stefani, 95, Italian partisan and politician, senator (1979–1987).
- Irving Stern, 94, American politician, member of the Minnesota Senate (1979–1982).
- Jack Taylor, 94, American broadcaster, heart failure.
- Ismail Tipi, 64, Turkish-German politician, member of the Landtag of Hesse (since 2010).
- Naďa Urbánková, 83, Czech singer and actress (Closely Watched Trains, Larks on a String, Seclusion Near a Forest), complications from cancer and COVID-19.
- Juan Velarde, 95, Spanish economist and academic.
- Shevah Weiss, 87, Polish-born Israeli politician, member (1981–1999) and speaker (1992–1996) of the Knesset.

=== 4 ===
- Oshwin Andries, 19, South African footballer (Stellenbosch), stabbed.
- Luciano Armani, 82, Italian racing cyclist.
- Vaco Baissac, 82, Mauritian artist.
- Don Blackburn, 84, Canadian ice hockey player (Philadelphia Flyers, New York Islanders, New York Rangers).
- José del Castillo, 79, Peruvian footballer (Cristal, national team).
- César Cordero Moscoso, 95, Ecuadorian Roman Catholic priest.
- Elettra Deiana, 81, Italian teacher and politician, deputy (2001–2008).
- Léon Engulu, 88, Congolese politician, governor of Katanga (1968–1970), minister of the interior (1990–1991) and senator (2003–2018).
- Susan Duhan Felix, 85, American ceramic artist.
- Jürgen Flimm, 81, German theater director and manager (Salzburg Festival, Berlin State Opera).
- Adrian Hall, 95, American theatre director.
- Eugene Iglesias, 96, Puerto Rican actor (Jack McCall, Desperado, Taza, Son of Cochise, The Naked Dawn), heart attack.
- Sherif Ismail, 67, Egyptian politician, prime minister (2015–2018).
- Vani Jairam, 77, Indian playback singer (Sankarabharanam, Guddi, Sollathaan Ninaikkiren), fall.
- Marv Kellum, 70, American football player (Pittsburgh Steelers, St. Louis Cardinals).
- Floyd Kerr, 76, American basketball player (Colorado State Rams).
- Pete Koegel, 75, American baseball player (Milwaukee Brewers, Philadelphia Phillies).
- Sarah Landau, 87, American architectural historian.
- Paul Martha, 80, American football player (Pittsburgh Steelers) and executive (San Francisco 49ers).
- Alois Mayer, 73, Austrian politician, member of the Municipal Council and Landtag of Vienna (1997–2015).
- Roberto Ongpin, 86, Filipino businessman and politician, MP (1978–1984) and minister of commerce and industry (1978–1986).
- Edward Pangelinan, 81, Northern Marianan politician, resident representative (1978–1984), pancreatic cancer.
- Anita Phillips, 77, Australian politician, member of the Legislative Assembly of Queensland (2001–2004).
- Arnold Schulman, 97, American screenwriter (Love with the Proper Stranger, Goodbye, Columbus, Tucker: The Man and His Dream).
- Jerry W. Tillman, 82, American politician, member of the North Carolina Senate (2003–2020).
- Ron Tompkins, 78, American baseball player (Kansas City Athletics, Chicago Cubs).
- Yagbonwura Tumtunba Boresa II, Ghanaian monarch, ruler of Gonja (since 2010).
- Harry Whittington, 95, American attorney and political figure (Dick Cheney hunting accident), complications from a fall.
- Rob Williams, 92, New Zealand army general, chief of the general staff (1981–1984).

=== 5 ===
- Hilda Adefarasin, 98, Nigerian women's rights activist.
- Hilary Alexander, 77, New Zealand-born British fashion journalist (The Daily Telegraph).
- Hank Beebe, 96, American composer (Bathtubs Over Broadway).
- Mordechai Bibi, 100, Iraqi-born Israeli politician, MK (1959–1974).
- Catherine Bonnet, 57, French tennis player.
- Knut Borchardt, 93, German historian.
- John Bracey Jr., 81, American scholar and historian.
- Chris Browne, 70, American cartoonist (Hägar the Horrible).
- Demetrius Calip, 53, American basketball player (Los Angeles Lakers).
- Donn Charnley, 94, American politician, member of the Washington House of Representatives (1971–1981, 1983–1985) and senate (1980–1983).
- Chu Yun-han, 67, Taiwanese political scholar, rectal cancer.
- Robin Cocks, 84, British geologist.
- Joy Davidson, 85, American operatic mezzo-soprano.
- Renato Del Ponte, 78, Italian essayist.
- Jean Desanlis, 97, French veterinarian and politician, deputy (1972–1997).
- Joan Wall, 89, English field hockey player and teacher, complications from dementia.
- Josep Maria Espinàs, 95, Spanish writer ("Cant del Barça"), journalist, and publisher.
- T. P. Gajendran, 68, Indian film director (Budget Padmanabhan, Middle Class Madhavan, Banda Paramasivam) and actor.
- Geoff Heskett, 93, Australian Olympic basketball player (1956).
- Hsing Yun, 95, Chinese Buddhist monk, founder of Fo Guang Shan and Buddha's Light International Association, kidney failure.
- Kang Seong-mo, 89, South Korean entrepreneur and politician, MNA (1988–1992).
- Abraham Lempel, 86, Polish-born Israeli computer scientist (LZ77 and LZ78).
- Pervez Musharraf, 79, Pakistani politician and military officer, president (2001–2008), minister of defence (1999–2002) and chief of Army staff (1998–2007), cardiac amyloidosis.
- Khalipha Nando, 81, Filipino Islamic militant, wa'lī of Bangsamoro (since 2019) and co-founder of the Moro Islamic Liberation Front.
- Ong Leong Boon, 76–77, Singaporean surgeon and politician, MP (1972–1980).
- Alan Orange, 67, British lichenologist.
- John H. Panabaker, 94, Canadian business executive and academic administrator, chancellor of McMaster University (1986–1992).
- Gerald Parsons, 89, English cricketer (Cornwall).
- Nukun Prachuapmo, 93, Thai politician, minister of transport (1991–1992, 1992).
- Inge Sargent, 90, Austrian-American author and human rights activist, queen consort of Hsipaw State (1953–1962).
- Takako Sasuga, 87, Japanese voice actress (Sazae-san, Danganronpa).
- May Sayegh, 82, Palestinian poet and political activist.
- Hansi Schmidt, 80, Romanian-born German handball player (VfL Gummersbach, Steaua București, West Germany national team).
- Vladimir Skulachev, 87, Russian biochemist, member of the Russian Academy of Sciences.
- Phil Spalding, 65, English bassist (GTR, Original Mirrors, Toyah).
- Roslyn Swartzman, 91, Canadian printmaker and painter.
- Rosa Tavarez, 83, Dominican painter and engraver.
- Jusaburō Tsujimura, 89, Japanese puppeteer and doll maker, heart failure.
- Kaye Vaughan, 91, American-born Canadian Hall of Fame football player (Ottawa Rough Riders).
- Quirin Vrehen, 90, Dutch physicist.
- Wu Zhongru, 83, Chinese hydraulic engineer, member of the Chinese Academy of Engineering.

=== 6 ===
- Moslem Uddin Ahmad, 74, Bangladeshi politician, MP (since 2020), cancer.
- Peter Allen, 76, English footballer (Leyton Orient, Millwall).
- Greta Andersen, 95, Danish swimmer, Olympic champion (1948).
- Janet Anderson, 73, British politician, minister for film, tourism and broadcasting (1998–2001) and MP (1992–2010).
- Abdellatif Ben Ammar, 79, Tunisian film director (A Simple Story, Aziza).
- Nugraha Besoes, 81, Indonesian football administrator and politician, MP (1977–1992).
- Niamh Bhreathnach, 77, Irish politician, twice minister for education, TD (1992–1997) and senator (1997).
- Bong Kee Chok, 85, Malaysian political activist.
- Rob Bruniges, 66, British Olympic fencer (1976, 1980, 1984).
- Gerardo Cavallieri, 80, Argentine Olympic cyclist.
- Jane Dowling, 97, British artist.
- Moses Gray, 85, American football player (Indiana Hoosiers, New York Titans).
- David Harris, 76, American journalist and anti-war activist.
- Emory Kristof, 80, American photographer.
- Inge Krogh, 102, Danish politician, MP (1973–1984).
- Carole Laganière, 64, Canadian documentary filmmaker
- Eugene Lee, 83, American set designer (Saturday Night Live, Candide, Sweeney Todd: The Demon Barber of Fleet Street).
- Nicolò Mineo, 89, Italian literary critic, literary historian and philologist.
- John Moeti, 55, South African footballer (Orlando Pirates, SuperSport United, national team).
- Charlie Norris, 59, American professional wrestler (Pro Wrestling America, WCW).
- Květa Pacovská, 94, Czech illustrator and writer.
- Pierre-Alain Parot, 72, French stained-glass artist.
- Jim Rose, 56, American sculptor, suicide.
- Violet Stanger, 82, Canadian politician, Saskatchewan MLA (1991–1999).
- Lubomír Štrougal, 98, Czech politician, prime minister of Czechoslovakia (1970–1988).
- Răzvan Theodorescu, 83, Romanian historian and politician, senator (2000–2008) and minister of culture (2000–2004).
- Billy Thomson, 64, Scottish footballer (St Mirren, Dundee United, national team).
- Miguel Lucas Tomás, 85, Spanish physician.
- B. K. S. Varma, 74, Indian painter, heart attack.
- Steve Woodmore, 62, British electronics salesman, Guinness World Records record holder for most words articulated per minute (1990–1995).
- Notable victims of the Turkey–Syria earthquakes:
  - Christian Atsu, 31, Ghanaian footballer (Newcastle United, Hatayspor, national team)
  - Nilay Aydoğan, 31, Turkish basketball player (national team)
  - Nader Joukhadar, 45, Syrian football player (Al-Wathba, national team) and manager (Salam Zgharta)
  - Cemal Kütahya, 32, Turkish handball player (national team)
  - Taner Savut, 48, Turkish footballer (Fenerbahçe, Siirtspor) and sporting director (Hatayspor)
  - Yakup Taş, 63, Turkish politician, MP (since 2018)
  - Zilan Tigris, 50–51, Turkish-Armenian singer
  - Ahmet Eyüp Türkaslan, 28, Turkish footballer (Osmanlıspor, Ümraniyespor, Yeni Malatyaspor)

=== 7 ===
- Eunice Anderson, 100–101, American actress (A League of Their Own, Jeremy, The Narrows).
- Tunku Abdul Aziz, 89, Malaysian politician, senator (2009–2012).
- Fernando Becerril, 78, Mexican actor (Zapata: el sueño del héroe, The Mask of Zorro, Get the Gringo).
- Luis Jaime Carvajal y Salas, 80, Spanish Olympic equestrian (1972).
- František Cipro, 75, Czech football player and manager (Slavia Prague, Dynamo České Budějovice, Chmel Blšany), colon cancer.
- Pio D'Emilia, 68, Italian journalist (il manifesto, L'Espresso).
- Daniel Defert, 85, French sociologist and AIDS activist, founder of AIDES.
- Abdelkader Drif, 85, Algerian sporting director.
- Jane F. Gentleman, 82–83, American-Canadian statistician.
- Karma Ghale, 59, Nepali politician, MP (since 2018), prostate cancer.
- Mihail-Viorel Ghindă, 73, Romanian chess International Master. (death announced on this date)
- Lee Greenfield, 81, American politician, member of the Minnesota House of Representatives (1979–2001).
- Dieter Haaßengier, 88, German politician, member of the Landtag of Lower Saxony (1970–1976).
- Benet Hytner, 95, English barrister.
- Teuku Sama Indra, 58, Indonesian politician, regent of South Aceh (2013–2018).
- Makoto Itoh, 86, Japanese economist, heart attack.
- Richard Kell, 95, Irish poet, composer, and teacher. (death announced on this date)
- Tonya Knight, 56, American professional bodybuilder and game show contestant (American Gladiators), cancer.
- Joseph Loeckx, 85, Belgian comic book artist (Clifton, Tintin, La Ribambelle).
- Friedel Lutz, 84, German footballer (Eintracht Frankfurt, West Germany national team).
- Andrew J. McKenna, 93, American businessman, chairman of McDonald's (2004–2016).
- Mendelson Joe, 78, Canadian singer-songwriter, assisted suicide.
- Hiroki Nakata, 58, Japanese professional shogi player.
- Mati Põldre, 86, Estonian film director (Those Old Love Letters, Georg), screenwriter and cinematographer.
- Oleksandr Radchenko, 46, Ukrainian footballer (Dynamo Kyiv, Dnipro, national team).
- Thibaut de Reimpré, 73–74, French painter.
- Alfredo Rizzo, 89, Italian Olympic runner (1960).
- K. Warner Schaie, 95, American social gerontologist and psychologist.
- Volkmar Sigusch, 82, German sexologist, physician and sociologist.
- Sir William Taylor, 92, British educator and academic administrator, vice-chancellor of the University of Hull (1985–1991). (death announced on this date)
- Anthony Thiselton, 85, English Anglican priest, theologian and academic.
- Fleur de Villiers, 85, South African journalist and business consultant, stroke.
- Leontii Voitovych, 71, Ukrainian historian.
- Wolfgang Weber, 83, German engineer and politician, member of the Landtag of Saxony (1990–1994).
- Luc Winants, 60, Belgian chess player.
- Royden Wood, 92, English footballer (New Brighton, Clitheroe, Leeds United).

=== 8 ===
- Burt Bacharach, 94, American Hall of Fame composer ("Raindrops Keep Fallin' on My Head", "Walk On By", "Arthur's Theme (Best That You Can Do)"), six-time Grammy winner.
- Miroslav Blažević, 87, Croatian football player (Rijeka) and manager (Dinamo Zagreb, national team), prostate cancer.
- Fritz Enskat, 84, German Olympic diver (1960).
- Elena Fanchini, 37, Italian Olympic alpine ski racer (2006, 2010, 2014), cancer.
- Shirley Fulton, 71, American jurist, judge of the North Carolina Superior Court (1988–2002), gallbladder cancer.
- Arto Heiskanen, 59, Finnish ice hockey player (Porin Ässät, Lukko, Albatros de Brest).
- Volkan Kahraman, 43, Austrian football player (Excelsior, SV Pasching, national team) and manager, shot.
- Cody Longo, 34, American actor (Hollywood Heights, Days of Our Lives, Piranha 3D).
- Jesús Agustín López de Lama, 93, Spanish Roman Catholic prelate, bishop-prelate of Corocoro (1966–1991).
- Dennis Lotis, 97, South African-born British singer and actor (It's a Wonderful World, The City of the Dead, What Every Woman Wants).
- Igor Mangushev, 36, Russian nationalist and mercenary, founder of the E.N.O.T. Corp., shot.
- Dennis M. McCarthy, 78, American lieutenant general.
- Subimal Mishra, 79, Indian novelist.
- Vladimir Ivanovich Morozov, 82, Turkmen sprint canoeist, Olympic champion (1964, 1968, 1972).
- Mihály Oláh, 74, Hungarian Olympic biathlete.
- Ignatius Paul Pinto, 97, Indian Roman Catholic prelate, bishop of Shimoga (1989–1998) and archbishop of Bangalore (1998–2004).
- Ramón Saadi, 74, Argentine politician, MP (1987–1988, 2003–2009) and governor of Catamarca Province (1983–1991).
- Wolfgang Schallenberg, 92, Austrian diplomat, ambassador to India (1974–1978), Spain (1979–1981), and France (1988–1992).
- Ivan Silayev, 92, Russian politician, premier of the Soviet Union (1991), chairman of the council of ministers (1990–1991) and minister of aviation industry (1981–1985).
- Branka Veselinović, 104, Serbian actress (A Child of the Community).
- Manousos Voloudakis, 56, Greek politician, MP (2007–2009, 2012–2014, since 2019).
- Julian Wasser, 89, American photographer.
- Oscar Lawton Wilkerson, 96, American pilot (Tuskegee Airmen) and radio personality.

=== 9 ===
- Marcos Alonso, 63, Spanish football player (Barcelona, Atlético Madrid, national team) and manager.
- Ain Andressoo, 87, Estonian archer and architect.
- Jen Angel, 48, American writer, traffic collision.
- Ali al-Bahadili, 80, Iraqi politician, minister of agriculture (2005–2010).
- Baracouda, 28, French racehorse.
- Changoleón, c. 82, Mexican television personality.
- Bill Currey, 78, New Zealand rugby player.
- György Czakó, 89, Hungarian Olympic figure skater (1952).
- Jean-Maurice Dehousse, 86, Belgian politician, MP (1971–1981), minister-president of Wallonia (1982–1985), MEP (1999–2004).
- Charlie Faulkner, 81, Welsh rugby union player (national team, British & Irish Lions) and coach (Newport RFC), heart failure.
- Sıtkı Güvenç, 61, Turkish politician, MP (2011–2015), complications from injuries sustained in an earthquake.
- Princess Marie Gabrielle, 97, Luxembourgish royal.
- Doug Mattis, 56, American figure skater.
- Marijke Merckens, 83, Dutch actress and singer (A Woman Like Eve, Honneponnetje).
- O Kuk-ryol, 93, North Korean military officer, chief of the general staff (1980–1988) and vice chairman of the National Defence Commission (2009–2016), heart failure.
- Ferhat Ozcep, 55, Turkish geophysicist.
- Nelson Rising, 81, American businessman (Federal Reserve Bank of San Francisco), complications from Alzheimer's disease.
- Lewis Spratlan, 82, American music academic and composer, idiopathic pulmonary fibrosis.
- Wesley Stacey, 81–82, Australian photographer, co-founder of the Australian Centre for Photography.
- Dimitrious Stanley, 48, American football player (New Jersey Red Dogs, Winnipeg Blue Bombers), prostate cancer.
- Tunnet Taimla, 34, Estonian renju player, world champion (2003, 2013).
- Yukio Takano, 85, Japanese politician, mayor of Toshima (since 1999) and member of the Tokyo Metropolitan Assembly (1989–1999), COVID-19.
- David Vaughan, 60, British climatologist, stomach cancer.
- Sasa Zivoulovic, 50, Greek Olympic handball player (2004).

=== 10 ===
- Marcel Adamczyk, 88, French footballer (FC Nancy, Lille, national team).
- AKA, 35, South African rapper, shot.
- Garland E. Allen, 86, American historian and biographer.
- Morris J. Amitay, 86, American administrator, executive director of the American Israel Public Affairs Committee (1974–1980).
- Amjad Islam Amjad, 78, Pakistani poet and screenwriter (Waris, Dehleez, Din), cardiac arrest.
- Giovanni Bettini, 84, Italian architect and politician, deputy (1979–1983).
- Len Birman, 90, Canadian-American actor (Silver Streak, Generations, Captain America).
- Robbyanto Budiman, 56, Indonesian businessman.
- Larry Coyer, 79, American football coach (Tampa Bay Buccaneers, Denver Broncos, Indianapolis Colts).
- Sir David Elliott, 93, British diplomat.
- Delano Franklyn, 63, Jamaican politician, senator (2002–2007).
- Erich Froelich, 85, German-born Canadian professional wrestler.
- Sir Charles Gray, 94, Scottish politician, leader of the Strathclyde Regional Council (1986–1992).
- Michael Green, 69, American molecular and cell biologist.
- Toni Harper, 85, American singer.
- Hugh Hudson, 86, English film director (Chariots of Fire, Greystoke: The Legend of Tarzan, Lord of the Apes, My Life So Far).
- Satoshi Iriki, 55, Japanese baseball player (Kintetsu Buffaloes, Yomiuri Giants, Tokyo Yakult Swallows), traffic collision.
- Marguerite Jauzelon, 105, French volunteer paramedic.
- Jacob L. Mey, 96, Dutch-born Danish professor of linguistics.
- Hans Modrow, 95, German politician, chairman of the Council of Ministers of East Germany (1989–1990), MEP (1999–2004) and MP (1990–1994), stroke.
- Carleton Moore, 90, American molecular scientist.
- Samuel Moreno Rojas, 62, Colombian politician, senator (1991–2006), mayor of Bogotá (2008–2011), cardiac arrest.
- Horst Nickel, 88, German Olympic biathlete (1960).
- Ron Roddan, 91, British athletics coach.
- Carlos Saura, 91, Spanish film director (Mama Turns 100, Carmen, The Hunt), respiratory failure.
- Mitsuo Shindō, 74, Japanese art director, stomach cancer.
- Gautam Shome Sr., 62, Indian cricketer (Bengal).
- René-Samuel Sirat, 92, French rabbi, chief rabbi of France (1981–1988).
- Ben Steinberg, 93, Canadian composer, conductor and music educator.
- Paul Sullivan, 85, Australian footballer (Hawthorn).
- Sergey Tereshchenko, 71, Kazakh politician, prime minister (1991–1994).
- Nancy Tichborne, 80, New Zealand watercolour artist and gardener.
- Tôn Đức Lượng, 98, Vietnamese painter.
- Xiang Xuan, 96, Chinese soldier, youngest soldier to take part in the Long March.
- Zhai Zhonghe, 92, Chinese biologist, member of the Chinese Academy of Sciences.

=== 11 ===
- Barrie Barbary, 84, Australian footballer (North Adelaide, Woodville).
- David K. Barton, 95, American radar systems engineer.
- Deniz Baykal, 84, Turkish politician, minister of foreign affairs and deputy prime minister (1995–1996).
- Kevin Bell, 67, American football player (New York Jets).
- Howard Bragman, 66, American public relations executive, leukemia.
- Helena Parente Cunha, 93, Brazilian educator and writer.
- Odd Eriksen, 67, Norwegian politician, minister of trade and industry (2005–2006) and governor of Nordland (2006–2013).
- Adrien Fainsilber, 90, French architect.
- Tito Fernández, 80, Chilean singer-songwriter.
- James Flynn, 57, Irish film and television producer (Vikings, The Last Duel, The Banshees of Inisherin).
- Brianna Ghey, 16, British transgender girl, stabbed.
- Anatoly Grigoriev, 79, Russian physiologist.
- Robert Hébras, 97, French massacre survivor (Oradour-sur-Glane).
- Robert Dean Hunter, 94, American politician, member of the Texas House of Representatives (1986–2007).
- Lee James, 69, American weightlifter, Olympic silver medalist (1976).
- Jassim Ismail Juma, 85, Kuwaiti politician, MP (1971–1975).
- Ivan Kováč, 74, Slovak middle-distance runner and radio sports commentator.
- Simas Kudirka, 92, Lithuanian sailor (The Defection of Simas Kudirka).
- Erwan Kurtubi, 72, Indonesian politician, regent of Pandeglang (2009–2010, 2011–2016).
- Agnès Laroche, 57, French author and novelist.
- Séamus Ryan, 85–86, Irish hurler.
- Donald Spoto, 81, American biographer, brain hemorrhage.
- Eleanor Sterling, 62, American conservationist and biologist.
- Muhammad Waris, Pakistani alleged blasphemer, lynched.

=== 12 ===
- Vadim Abdrashitov, 78, Russian film director (Fox Hunting, The Train Has Stopped, Planet Parade), cancer.
- Lualhati Bautista, 77, Filipino novelist (Dekada '70, Bata, Bata... Pa'no Ka Ginawa?), screenwriter (Bulaklak sa City Jail) and activist.
- Roger Bobo, 84, American tuba player.
- Aimé Brisson, 94, Canadian politician, Quebec MNA (1962–1976).
- Theo Dunne, 85, Irish football player (Shelbourne) and manager (UCD).
- Enrich, 93, Spanish cartoonist.
- Doug Fisher, 75, American football player (Pittsburgh Steelers).
- Nadine Girault, 63, Canadian politician, Quebec MNA (2018–2022).
- John Godwin, 94, British-Nigerian architect.
- Nadia Hashem, Jordanian journalist (Al Ra'i) and politician, minister of state for women's affairs (2012).
- Miloš Janoušek, 70, Slovak folk musician, stroke.
- David Jolicoeur, 54, American rapper (De La Soul) and songwriter ("Me Myself and I", "Feel Good Inc."), Grammy winner (2006).
- Brian Lee, 86, British football manager (Wycombe Wanderers).
- Ted Lerner, 97, American real estate developer, owner of the Washington Nationals (since 2006) and founder of Lerner Enterprises, pneumonia.
- Philippe Lopes-Curval, 71, French film director and screenwriter (The Chorus, Monsieur Batignole, Boudu).
- Amazonino Mendes, 83, Brazilian politician, mayor of Manaus (2009–2012) and three-time governor of Amazonas, pneumonia.
- Linda King Newell, 82, American historian and Mormon scholar (Mormon Enigma).
- Franc' Pairon, 74, Belgian fashion designer, cancer.
- Subbarayan Pasupathy, 82, Indian-born Canadian electrical engineer.
- Ramón Palacios Rubio, 102, Spanish engineer and politician, senator (1996–2000).
- Yousef Al-Salem, 37, Saudi Arabian footballer (Al Qadsiah, Ettifaq, national team).
- Narayan Satham, 73, Indian cricketer (Baroda).
- Robert Sauzet, 95, French historian.
- Eileen Sheridan, 99, English racing cyclist.
- J. Paul Taylor, 102, American politician, member of the New Mexico House of Representatives (1987–2005).
- George Tidy, 91, Scottish footballer (Brechin City, Berwick Rangers, Dunfermline Athletic).
- W. Russell Todd, 94, American army major general.
- Arne Treholt, 80, Norwegian convicted spy.
- Suat Türker, 46, Turkish-German footballer (Kickers Offenbach, TSF Ditzingen, İstanbulspor), heart attack.
- Billy Two Rivers, 87, Canadian professional wrestler (GPW), actor (Black Robe), and chief of the Mohawks of Kahnawà:ke (1978–1998).

=== 13 ===
- Reza Ali, 82, Bangladeshi politician, MP (2009–2014).
- Thierry Alla, 67, French musicologist and composer.
- Tim Aymar, 59, American heavy metal singer (Pharaoh).
- Guido Basso, 85, Canadian jazz trumpeter.
- Oleg Bejenar, 51, Ukrainian-Moldovan football player (Tiligul Tiraspol, Dinamo Bender) and manager (Speranța Crihana Veche), heart attack.
- Roger Bonk, 78, American football player (North Dakota Fighting Sioux, Winnipeg Blue Bombers).
- Josie Childs, 96, American civic leader and community activist.
- Eddie Conway, 76, American Black Panther Party leader.
- Conrad Dobler, 72, American football player (St. Louis Cardinals, New Orleans Saints, Buffalo Bills).
- Brian DuBois, 55, American baseball player (Detroit Tigers).
- Mikaela Fabricius-Bjerre, 53, Finnish Olympic dressage rider (2012), cancer.
- Pierre Garcia, 79, French football player and manager (Stade Briochin, Rennes).
- Robert Geddes, 99, American architect, dean of the Princeton University School of Architecture (1965–1982).
- José María Gil-Robles, 87, Spanish politician, president of the European Parliament (1997–1999).
- Alain Goraguer, 91, French jazz pianist, arranger and film composer (Fantastic Planet, Saint Laurent).
- Milan Hamada, 89, Slovak literary critic.
- Tamás Holovits, 83, Hungarian Olympic sailor (1980).
- Lalita Lajmi, 90, Indian painter.
- Carl-Åke Ljung, 88, Swedish Olympic sprint canoer (1956).
- Tom Luddy, 79, American film producer (Barfly, The Secret Garden), co-founder of the Telluride Film Festival.
- Leiji Matsumoto, 85, Japanese manga artist (Space Battleship Yamato, Galaxy Express 999, Space Pirate Captain Harlock), heart failure.
- Zia Mohyeddin, 91, British-Pakistani actor (Lawrence of Arabia, Khartoum, Ashanti) and television broadcaster.
- Chris Mushohwe, 69, Zimbabwean politician, senator (2008–2018).
- Kéné Ndoye, 44, Senegalese Olympic track and field athlete (2000, 2004).
- Jean Pattou, 82, French architect and artist.
- Deirdre Purcell, 77, Irish author, journalist and stage actor.
- Nektarios Santorinios, 50, Greek politician, MP (since 2015), cancer.
- Suzanne Sens, 92, French author and teacher.
- Shi Zhongci, 89, Chinese mathematician, member of the Chinese Academy of Sciences.
- David Singmaster, 84, American mathematician.
- Huey "Piano" Smith, 89, American R&B pianist and songwriter ("Rockin' Pneumonia and the Boogie Woogie Flu").
- Jesse Treviño, 76, Mexican-American painter, throat cancer.
- István Varga, 62, Hungarian Olympic judoka (1988).
- Spencer Wiggins, 81, American soul singer.
- Oliver Wood, 80, British cinematographer (The Bourne Ultimatum, Face/Off, Morbius), cancer.
- Maurie Young, 85, Australian footballer (Hawthorn, East Perth).

=== 14 ===
- Afternoon Deelites, 30, American Thoroughbred racehorse, euthanized.
- Javed Khan Amrohi, 73, Indian actor (Andaz Apna Apna, Lagaan, Chak De! India), respiratory failure.
- Viktor Aristov, 84, Ukrainian football player (Metalist Kharkiv, SKA Odesa, Energiya Volzhsky) and coach.
- Friedrich Cerha, 96, Austrian composer, conductor, and music educator.
- John Chipman, 95–96, Canadian-born American economist. (death announced on this date)
- Mikhael Daher, 94, Lebanese lawyer and politician, MP (1972–1996, 2000–2005), minister of education (1992–1995).
- Roger Ellis, 93, British headmaster, heart failure.
- Charley Ferguson, 83, American football player (Buffalo Bills, Cleveland Browns, Minnesota Vikings).
- Emil C. Gotschlich, 88, American chemist, developer of the meningococcal vaccine.
- Allen Green, 84, American football player (Dallas Cowboys).
- Anthony Green, 83, English painter and printmaker.
- Serge Christian Guébogo, Cameroonian footballer and coach.
- Gary L. Harrell, 71, American major general, glioblastoma.
- Jerry Jarrett, 80, American Hall of Fame professional wrestler (NWA Mid-America) and promoter, founder of CWA and NWA:TNA, esophageal cancer.
- Hrvoje Kačić, 91, Croatian legal scholar, politician and water polo player, Olympic silver medallist (1956), MP (1990–1994).
- Wim Kras, 79, Dutch footballer (Volendam).
- William Joseph Kurtz, 87, Polish Roman Catholic prelate, bishop of Kundiawa (1982–1999), coadjutor archbishop (1999–2001) and archbishop (2001–2010) of Madang.
- Greg McMackin, 77, American football coach (Oregon Tech Hustlin' Owls, Hawaii Warriors).
- Marwan G. Najjar, 76, Lebanese screenwriter.
- John Prince, 77, New Zealand croquet player.
- Christine Pritchard, 79, British actress (Cara Fi, The Indian Doctor, O Na! Y Morgans!).
- Duangphet Phromthep, 17, Thai footballer, suicide.
- Peter Renkens, 55, Belgian singer (Confetti's). (death announced on this date)
- Serge Roullet, 96, French film director and screenwriter (The Wall, Benito Cereno).
- Baxtiyor Sayfullayev, 71, Uzbek politician, minister of culture (2012–2020), senator (since 2020).
- Vito Schlickmann, 94, Brazilian Roman Catholic prelate, auxiliary bishop of Florianópolis (1995–2004).
- Sherwood Schwarz, 92, American sports executive, owner of the Toronto Argonauts.
- Antoine Stinco, 89, French architect.
- Neale Stoner, 88, American sports coach and athletic director.
- Kudarikoti Annadanayya Swamy, 87, Indian jurist, chief justice of Madras High Court (1993–1997).
- Dame Kathrin Thomas, 78, British public servant, lord lieutenant of Mid Glamorgan (2003–2019).
- Shoichiro Toyoda, 97, Japanese automotive executive, chairman of Toyota (1992–1999).
- John M. Veitch, 77, American Hall of Fame racehorse trainer.
- John Ward, 84, English potter.

=== 15 ===
- Paul Berg, 96, American biochemist, Nobel Prize laureate (1980).
- Kevin Bird, 70, English footballer (Mansfield Town, Huddersfield Town).
- Bill Brown, 71, American basketball coach (Kenyon Lords).
- Eileen Fitt, 71, British news editor and journalist, lung infection.
- James Fleming, 83, Canadian journalist and politician, MP (1972–1984), minister of state for multiculturalism (1980–1983).
- Shōzō Iizuka, 89, Japanese voice actor (Mobile Suit Gundam, Fist of the North Star, Dragon Ball Z), heart failure.
- Paul Jerrard, 57, Canadian ice hockey player (Minnesota North Stars) and coach (Colorado Avalanche, Calgary Flames), cancer.
- Ron Johnson, 84, Australian footballer (Richmond).
- Catherine McArdle Kelleher, 84, American political scientist.
- Gummadi Kuthuhalamma, 73, Indian politician, Andhra Pradesh MLA (1985–2014).
- Bernie Laffey, 94, Australian footballer (Footscray).
- Graham Lake, 87, English cricketer (Gloucestershire).
- Leone Manti, 79, Italian politician, deputy (1992–1994).
- Herbie McCracken, 95, Northern Irish rugby union player.
- Giampiero Neri, 95, Italian poet.
- Oh Takbeon, 79, South Korean writer, poet and literary critic.
- David Oreck, 99, American entrepreneur.
- Dario Penne, 84, Italian actor (E le stelle stanno a guardare) and voice actor.
- Qian Guoliang, 83, Chinese general, commander of the Jinan (1993–1996) and the Shenyang Military Region (1999–2004).
- Gilbert Rist, 84, Swiss educator.
- Hans-Christian Siebke, 82, German farmer and politician, member of the Landtag of Schleswig-Holstein (1996–2000).
- Grzegorz Skrzecz, 65, Polish Olympic boxer (1980).
- Brigitte Smadja, 67, Tunisian-born French author.
- David Smith, 87, British chemical physicist.
- Kerstin Tidelius, 88, Swedish actress (Fanny and Alexander, Ådalen 31, Hem till byn).
- Raquel Welch, 82, American actress (One Million Years B.C., The Three Musketeers, Fantastic Voyage), complications from Alzheimer's disease.
- John E. Woods, 80, American translator.
- Xu Binshi, 91, Chinese engineer, member of the Chinese Academy of Engineering.
- Zaenal Ma'arif, 67, Indonesian politician, MP (2004–2007).
- Algimantas Žižiūnas, 83, Lithuanian photographer.

=== 16 ===
- Jana Andrsová, 83, Czech ballerina and actress (The Strakonice Bagpiper, Jak se Franta naučil bát).
- Tulsidas Balaram, 86, Indian footballer (Hyderabad City Police, East Bengal, national team), multiple organ failure.
- Sham Binda, 69, Surinamese entrepreneur and politician, MP (since 2020).
- Michel Deville, 91, French film director (The Reader, Le Voyage en douce, Death in a French Garden).
- Colin Dobson, 82, English footballer (Sheffield Wednesday, Huddersfield Town, Bristol Rovers).
- Simone Edwards, 49, Jamaican-American basketball player (Seattle Storm), ovarian cancer.
- Parvis Emad, 87, Iranian-American philosopher and translator.
- John Fedosoff, 90, Canadian football player (Toronto Argonauts, Hamilton Tiger-Cats, Saskatchewan Roughriders).
- Kim Fripp, 70, Canadian Olympic ski jumper (1976).
- Héctor Mario Gómez Galvarriato, 85, Mexican engineer, inventor and businessman.
- Gunnar Heinsohn, 79, German author, sociologist and economist.
- Alex Herrera, 43, Venezuelan baseball player (Cleveland Indians).
- Ellen Hovde, 97, American documentary filmmaker (Grey Gardens).
- Al Jacks, 87, American college football coach (Clarion Golden Eagles, Williams Ephs).
- Chuck Jackson, 85, American R&B singer ("Any Day Now", "I Keep Forgettin'", "Tell Him I'm Not Home").
- Charles Knode, 80, British costume designer (Blade Runner, Braveheart, Monty Python's Life of Brian).
- Maon Kurosaki, 35, Japanese pop singer.
- Jatu Lahiri, 86, Indian politician, West Bengal MLA (1991–2006, 2011–2016).
- Tim Lobinger, 50, German Olympic pole vaulter (1996, 2000, 2004), leukaemia.
- J.D. MacFarlane, 89, American politician, Colorado Attorney General (1975–1983).
- Marilú, 95, Mexican singer and actress (El barchante Neguib).
- Tony Marshall, 85, German Schlager and opera singer.
- Tim McCarver, 81, American baseball player (St. Louis Cardinals, Philadelphia Phillies) and broadcaster (Fox Sports), heart failure.
- Yvette Monginou, 95, French Olympic athlete (1948, 1952).
- Aníbal Palma, 87, Chilean politician and diplomat, minister of education (1972) and housing and urbanism (1973).
- Gunvor Pontén, 94, Swedish actress (Violence, Tic Tac, Spring of Joy).
- Helen Fogwill Porter, 92, Canadian author.
- Fritz Prossinagg, 92, Austrian Olympic middle-distance runner.
- Alberto Radius, 80, Italian guitarist and singer-songwriter (Formula 3).
- Marie Borge Refsum, 95, Norwegian politician, deputy MP (1973–1977).
- Giorgio Ruffolo, 96, Italian politician, MP (1983–1994) and minister of the environment (1987–1992).
- Kenny Simpkins, 79, Welsh footballer (Hartlepool United, Boston United, Wrexham).
- Hank Skinner, 60, American convicted murderer.
- Stratis Stratigis, 89, Greek lawyer and politician, MP (1985–1989).
- Mario Vitti, 96, Italian philologist.
- Mario Zurlini, 80, Italian football player (Napoli, F.C. Matera) and coach (Savoia).

=== 17 ===
- Yuth Angkinandana, 86, Thai politician, MP (1983–2001).
- Joyce Arleen, 91, American actress (Kings Row, The Gay Sisters, Mrs. Wiggs of the Cabbage Patch).
- Alparslan Arslan, 45–46, Turkish convicted murderer, suicide by hanging.
- Otis Barthoulameu, 71, American musician (Fluf, Olivelawn) and record producer (Cheshire Cat).
- Géza Bejek, 88, Hungarian Olympic gymnast (1960).
- Rebecca Blank, 67, American economist and academic administrator, acting secretary of commerce (2011, 2012–2013) and chancellor of UW-Madison (2013–2022), cancer.
- Elda Cerrato, 92, Argentine artist.
- Amritpal Chotu, Indian comedian and actor (Sardaar Ji, Ravanan).
- Keith Christensen, 75, American football player (New Orleans Saints, Edmonton Eskimos).
- Jenny Clève, 92, French actress (F comme Fairbanks, One Deadly Summer, Welcome to the Sticks).
- Michaël Denard, 78, German-born French dancer and actor.
- Jerry Dodgion, 90, American jazz saxophonist and flautist, complications from an infection.
- Moses Elisaf, 68, Greek politician, mayor of Ioannina (since 2019), cancer.
- Gerald Fried, 95, American film and television composer (Paths of Glory, The Killing, Star Trek), pneumonia.
- Elissa Minet Fuchs, 103, American ballerina and choreographer.
- Ángela Gurría, 93, Mexican sculptor.
- John Holdsworth, 76, English rugby league referee.
- Kyle Jacobs, 49, American songwriter ("More Than a Memory"), suicide by gunshot.
- James A. Joseph, 87, American diplomat, ambassador to South Africa (1996–1999).
- Vijay Kichlu, 92, Indian classical singer, heart attack.
- Henry LaFont, Puerto Rican actor and comedian.
- André Le Goupil, 92, French Olympic equestrian (1968).
- Patti Love, 75, British actress (That'll Be the Day, The Long Good Friday, Mrs Henderson Presents).
- John Mason, 78, Indian schoolmaster and educationist.
- Henrietta Mbawah, 34, Sierra Leonean actress and social activist.
- Jim Mellen, 87, American Marxist activist, COPD.
- George T. Miller, 79, Scottish-born Australian film director (The Man from Snowy River, The NeverEnding Story II: The Next Chapter, Zeus and Roxanne), heart attack.
- Peter Muller, 95, Australian architect.
- George Myers, 83, Jamaican-born Bahamian hotelier, vice president of Resorts International (1977–1992).
- Peter Nanfuri, 80, Ghanaian police officer, inspector general of police (1996–2001).
- Pansequito, 78, Spanish flamenco singer, brain cancer.
- Hans Poulsen, 77, Australian singer and songwriter.
- Shahnawaz Pradhan, 56, Indian actor (Alif Laila, Hari Mirchi Lal Mirchi, Phantom), heart attack.
- Malik Mohammad Qayyum, 79, Pakistani lawyer, attorney general (2007–2008).
- João Maurício Fernandes Salgueiro, 88, Portuguese economist and politician, minister of finance (1981–1983).
- Maurizio Scaparro, 91, Italian stage director.
- Stella Stevens, 84, American actress (Girls! Girls! Girls!, The Nutty Professor, The Poseidon Adventure), complications from Alzheimer's disease.
- Arne Tumyr, 89, Norwegian journalist (Nybrott, Sørlandet, Fædrelandsvennen) and politician, leader of Stop Islamisation of Norway (2007–2014).
- Lee Whitlock, 54, British actor (Shine on Harvey Moon, Cassandra's Dream, Grange Hill).
- Tom Whitlock, 68, American songwriter ("Danger Zone", "Take My Breath Away", "Winner Takes It All"), Oscar winner (1987), complications from Alzheimer's disease.

=== 18 ===
- Clemens Arvay, 42, Austrian biologist and writer, suicide by jumping.
- Britt Bendixen, 81, Danish choreographer.
- Peter Bonnet, 86, British major general.
- Barbara Bosson, 83, American actress (Hill Street Blues, The Last Starfighter, Murder One).
- Jim Broyhill, 95, American politician, member of the U.S. House of Representatives (1963–1986) and Senate (1986).
- Peter Cairns, 84, Canadian navy admiral.
- Ilario Castagner, 82, Italian football player and manager (Perugia, Milan, Inter Milan).
- Robert Cazala, 89, French road racing cyclist.
- Thomas R. Donahue, 94, American labor leader, president of the AFL–CIO (1995), complications from a fall.
- Wendell Fleming, 94, American mathematician.
- Léopold L. Foulem, 77, Canadian ceramicist.
- Peter Herrndorf, 82, Canadian lawyer and television executive, chairman of TVOntario (1992–1999).
- Huang Da, 97, Chinese economist and academic administrator, president of the Renmin University of China (1991–1994).
- Cam Jacobs, 60, American football player (Tampa Bay Buccaneers), complications from cardiac arrest.
- Gabriel Chen-Ying Ly, 93, Taiwanese philosopher, president of Fu Jen Catholic University (1992–1996).
- Ammon McNeely, 52, American rock climber, fall.
- David G. O'Connell, 69, Irish-born American Roman Catholic prelate, auxiliary bishop of Los Angeles (since 2015), shot.
- Yoshihisa Okumura, 96, Japanese engineer.
- Ahmet Suat Özyazıcı, 87, Turkish football player (İdmanocağı) and manager (Trabzonspor).
- Taraka Ratna, 39, Indian actor (Okato Number Kurraadu, Yuva Rathna, Taarak), cardiac arrest.
- Terry Rodgers, 80, Australian footballer (Essendon).
- Steve Satterfield, 85, American football coach (Wofford Terriers)
- Justin O. Schmidt, 75, American entomologist, complications from Parkinson's disease.
- Don Shinn, 77, British musician.
- Richard H. Tilly, 90, American economic historian.
- Peter B. Warr, 85, British occupational psychologist.
- Peter Wolfenden, 88, New Zealand Hall of Fame harness racing driver and trainer.
- Petar Zhekov, 78, Bulgarian football player (Beroe, CSKA Sofia) and manager, Olympic silver medallist (1968).

=== 19 ===
- Richard Belzer, 78, American actor (Homicide: Life on the Street, Law & Order: Special Victims Unit, The Flash), comedian, and author.
- Frieda Brown, 91, Australian Christian campaigner.
- Nicola Bulley, 45, British missing person. (body discovered on this date)
- Dickie Davies, 94, British television presenter (World of Sport).
- Greg Foster, 64, American hurdler, Olympic silver medalist (1984).
- David Lance Goines, 77, American artist.
- Pierre Haïk, 72, French lawyer, complications from Alzheimer's disease.
- Nazmul Huda, 80, Bangladeshi politician, minister of communications (2001–2006), minister of information (1991–1996) and MP (1991–2006).
- Ferenc Jánosi, 84, Hungarian Olympic volleyball player (1964).
- Jean Le Garrec, 93, French politician, deputy (1981, 1986–1993, 1997–2007).
- Mayilsamy, 57, Indian actor (Manathile Oru Paattu, Vaimaye Vellum, Thai Poranthachu) and comedian, heart attack.
- Ebrima Mballow, Gambian diplomat and politician, minister of the interior (2018–2019).
- Red McCombs, 95, American businessman and sports team owner (San Antonio Spurs, Minnesota Vikings), co-founder of iHeartMedia.
- Henry McDonald, 57, Northern Irish writer and journalist (The Guardian, The Observer), cancer.
- Jim McMillin, 85, American football player (Denver Broncos, Oakland Raiders).
- Christopher Nupen, 88, South African filmmaker, complications from dementia.
- Jansen Panettiere, 28, American actor (The Secrets of Jonathan Sperry, The X's, Robots), cardiomegaly.
- Cornelius Price, 41, Irish organised crime leader, limbic encephalitis.
- Daniel Roche, 87, French historian.
- Jonathan M. Thompson, 51, American game designer.
- S. N. M. Ubayadullah, 81, Indian politician, Tamil Nadu MLA (1989–1991, 1996–2006).
- Rolf Wirtén, 91, Swedish politician, minister of economics (1981–1982) and MP (1966–1983).

=== 20 ===
- Bruce Barthol, 75, American bassist (Country Joe and the Fish).
- S. K. Bhagavan, 89, Indian film director, producer and screenwriter (Goa Dalli CID 999, Pratidwani, Chandanada Gombe).
- Bela Bose, 80, Indian actress (Shikar, Jeene Ki Raah, Jai Santoshi Maa) and dancer.
- Victor Brox, 81, English blues musician.
- Carla Casper, 77, American Olympic curler.
- George B. Dertilis, 84, Greek historian.
- Eldridge Emory, 87, American politician, member of the South Carolina House of Representatives (1998–2006).
- Şener Eruygur, 81, Turkish military officer, general commander of the gendarmerie (2002–2004).
- Semyon Gershtein, 93, Russian physicist, member of the Russian Academy of Sciences.
- Michael S. Heiser, 60, American biblical scholar and author, pancreatic cancer.
- Husnie Hentihu, 72, Indonesian politician, regent of Buru (2002–2012).
- John Hitt, 82, American academic administrator, president of the University of Central Florida (1992–2018).
- Om Prakash Kohli, 87, Indian politician, governor of Gujarat (2014–2019) and MP (1994–2000).
- Miklós Lendvai, 47, Hungarian footballer (Zalaegerszegi, Ferencvárosi, national team), suicide.
- Joe McKnight, 89, American politician, member of the Tennessee Senate (1987–1995).
- Rick Newman, 81, American comedy club owner (Catch a Rising Star), pancreatic cancer.
- Russell Peck, 89, American medievalist.
- Jim Savage, 86, New Zealand athlete, archer and table tennis player, Paralympic bronze medalist (1972, 1976).
- Ad Stouthamer, 91, Dutch microbiologist.
- Ken Warby, 83, Australian motorboat racer, holder of the water speed record (since 1977).

=== 21 ===
- Ron Altbach, 76, American keyboardist (King Harvest, Celebration) and songwriter ("Alone on Christmas Day").
- Amancio, 83, Spanish football player (Real Madrid, national team) and manager.
- Iris de Araújo, 79, Brazilian politician, deputy (2007–2015).
- John Arbuthnott, 83, Scottish microbiologist.
- W. Carl Burger, 97, German-born American painter.
- Abby Choi, 28, Hong Kong socialite and model.
- Zandra Flemister, 71, American Secret Service agent and diplomat.
- Ricardo García García-Ochoa, 78, Spanish lawyer and politician, member of the Cortes of Castile and León (1987–1991).
- Jesse Gress, 67, American rock guitarist.
- Helen Hutchinson, 88–89, Canadian broadcaster and media personality.
- Iraj Kalantari Taleghani, 85, Iranian architect.
- Nurul Islam Khan, Bangladeshi politician, MP (1973–1976).
- J. B. Kristiadi, 76, Indonesian civil servant.
- Mimika Luca, 85, Albanian actress (Our Friend Tili, Botë e padukshme, A Tale from the Past) and dancer.
- Ramiz Novruz, 67, Azerbaijani actor, stomach cancer.
- Albie Pearson, 88, American baseball player (Los Angeles/California Angels, Washington Senators, Baltimore Orioles).
- Achebe Betty Powell, 82, American activist and community leader, complications from COVID-19.
- Rayford Price, 86, American politician, member (1961–1973) and speaker (1972–1973) of the Texas House of Representatives.
- Simone Segouin, 97, French Resistance fighter.
- Eva Siracká, 96, Slovak physician.
- Marian Skubacz, 64, Polish Olympic wrestler (1988).
- Nadja Tiller, 93, Austrian actress (Rosemary, The Rough and the Smooth, Wanted: Babysitter).
- Norman Zide, 94, American linguist.

=== 22 ===
- Pascual Babiloni, 76, Spanish footballer (Castellón, Real Madrid, Benicarló).
- André Bailly, 81, Belgian politician, member of the Parliament of Wallonia (2001–2004).
- Elaine Barkin, 90, American composer.
- Mick Burns, 85, Irish hurler (Nenagh Éire Óg, Tipperary).
- Oyibo Chukwu, Nigerian lawyer and politician, shot.
- Richard Cooke, 76, English archaeologist.
- Guremu Demboba, 88, Ethiopian Olympic road cyclist (1956, 1960).
- Viera Gašparíková, 94, Slovak writer, folklorist and Slavist.
- Ellen Inga O. Hætta, 69, Norwegian politician.
- Kristina Holland, 78, American actress (The Courtship of Eddie's Father, The Funky Phantom, Butch Cassidy).
- Fujima Kansuma, 104, Japanese-American kabuki dancer, heart failure.
- Giorgos Katsoulis, 60, Greek water polo player (Olympiacos) and coach, cancer.
- Dermot Kelly, 90, Irish hurler (Limerick).
- Howard R. Lamar, 99, American historian, president of Yale University (1992–1993).
- Tatiana Lobo, 83, Chilean-born Costa Rican writer.
- Mats Löfving, 61, Swedish police officer, deputy director of the Swedish Police Authority (2014–2018).
- Dylan Lyons, 24, American television journalist (Spectrum News 13), shot.
- Bruno Mahlow, 85, German diplomat.
- Germano Mathias, 88, Brazilian samba singer.
- Román Mejías, 97, Cuban baseball player (Pittsburgh Pirates, Boston Red Sox).
- Augie Nieto, 65, American businessman, founder of Life Fitness, complications from amyotrophic lateral sclerosis.
- Phyllis Perkins, 89, British Olympic middle-distance runner (1960).
- Ahmed Qurei, 85, Palestinian politician, prime minister (2003–2006).
- Kanak Rele, 85, Indian classical dancer.
- Harry D. Schultz, 99, American investment advisor and author.
- Stanislav Štefkovič, 93, Slovak decathlete.
- Sun Manji, 91, Chinese biochemical pharmacologist.
- Subi Suresh, 41, Indian actress (Happy Husbands, Drama, Panchavarnathatha) and television anchor, liver disease.
- Tasuku Tsukada, 86, Japanese politician, mayor of Nagano (1985–2001).
- Jeff Watson, 80, British-born Australian journalist, presenter ('Beyond Tomorrow, Getaway) and author, brain cancer.
- Philip Ziegler, 93, British biographer and historian, cancer.

=== 23 ===
- Bernard Bellec, 88, French politician, mayor of Niort (1986–2002).
- Slim Borgudd, 76, Swedish racing driver and drummer (Lea Riders Group).
- Esperanza Bravo de Varona, 95, Cuban-born American archivist.
- Adrian Breacker, 88, English athlete.
- François Couchepin, 88, Swiss lawyer and politician, chancellor (1991–1999).
- John Croneberger, 84, American Episcopalian clergyman, bishop of Newark (2000–2007).
- Andrée Desautels, 99, Canadian musician, musicologist and music educator.
- Donald Dillbeck, 59, American convicted murderer, execution by lethal injection.
- Tony Earl, 86, American politician, governor of Wisconsin (1983–1987) and member of the Wisconsin State Assembly (1969–1975), stroke.
- Raymond L. Finch, 82, American judge.
- Syd Fischer, 95, Australian property developer and sailor.
- Jane Franklin, 88, American historian and author.
- Salundik Gohong, 76, Indonesian army officer and politician, mayor of Palangka Raya (1998–2003).
- Birgit Hein, 80, German film director, producer, and performance artist.
- Hasan Ali Khan, 71, Indian businessman.
- Thomas H. Lee, 78, American financier, founder of Thomas H. Lee Partners and Lee Equity Partners, suicide by gunshot.
- José Lei, 92, Hong Kong Olympic sport shooter (1968) and civil servant.
- Adam Lisewski, 79, Polish fencer, Olympic bronze medallist (1968).
- Mohd Kamal Hassan, 80, Malaysian Islamic scholar, rector of the IIUM (1998–2006), complications from surgery.
- John Motson, 77, English football commentator (BBC Sport, Talksport).
- Giuseppe Nirta, 82, Italian mobster, heart disease.
- John Olver, 86, American politician, member of the U.S. House of Representatives (1991–2013), Massachusetts Senate (1973–1991) and Massachusetts House of Representatives (1969–1973).
- Leonard E. Opdycke, 93, American historian.
- Bob Perryman, 58, American football player (New England Patriots, Denver Broncos).
- Jack Sheedy, 96, Australian Hall of Fame football player (East Fremantle, Western Australia) and coach (East Perth).
- Allen Steck, 96, American mountaineer and rock climber.
- Peter Tábori, 83, Hungarian-born British architect (Whittington Estate).
- Irving Wardle, 93, English theatre critic and writer.
- Patricia S. Warrick, 98, American literary scholar and editor.

=== 24 ===
- James Abourezk, 92, American politician, member of the U.S. House of Representatives (1971–1973) and Senate (1973–1979).
- Giorgos Adamopoulos, 76–77, Greek lawyer and politician, MP (1989–2000).
- Vic Anciaux, 91, Belgian doctor and politician, MP (1965–1995).
- Bae Deok-kwang, 74, South Korean politician, MNA (2014–2018).
- Merrick Baker-Bates, 83, British diplomat, commissioner for the British Antarctic Territory (1990–1992).
- Michael Blackwood, 88, American documentary filmmaker.
- Roslyn Chasan, 90, American lawyer.
- Maurizio Costanzo, 84, Italian television host, journalist, and screenwriter (The House with Laughing Windows, A Special Day, Zeder), complications from surgery.
- Ed Fury, 94, American bodybuilder and actor (Ursus, The Seven Revenges, Ursus in the Land of Fire).
- Adolf Goetzberger, 94, German physicist.
- Víctor Gómez Bergés, 82, Dominican lawyer, jurist and diplomat, minister of foreign affairs (1972–1975) and judge of the Constitutional Court (2011–2018).
- Felipe González González, 76, Mexican politician, governor of Aguascalientes (1998–2004) and senator (2006–2012).
- Sir Bernard Ingham, 90, British journalist and civil servant, Downing Street press secretary (1979–1990).
- Juraj Jakubisko, 84, Slovak film director (Birds, Orphans and Fools, The Millennial Bee, The Feather Fairy) and screenwriter.
- Serhii Korol, 52, Ukrainian soldier, Hero of Ukraine.
- William Leckie, 94, British Olympic rower (1948).
- Walter Liese, 97, German forestry and wood researcher and wood biologist.
- Jim Lightfoot, 89, English motorcycle speedway rider.
- Walter Mirisch, 101, American film producer (In the Heat of the Night, Midway, The Hawaiians), Oscar winner (1967).
- Edith Peinemann, 85, German violinist.
- Edith Roger, 100, Norwegian dancer and choreographer.
- Georgios Romeos, 88, Greek writer and politician, MEP (1984–1993).
- Louis Roquet, 80, Canadian academic, chancellor of the University of Montreal (2018–2021).
- Peter Roquette, 95, German mathematician.
- Mahfouz Saber, 78, Egyptian judge and politician, minister of justice (2014–2015).
- Devisingh Ransingh Shekhawat, 89, Indian politician, first gentleman (2007–2012) and Maharashtra MLA (1985–1990), complications from a fall.
- David L. Starling, 73, American railroad executive (Kansas City Southern Railway).
- Tom Tierney, 46, Irish rugby union player (national team) and coach.
- Patrick Vian, 80, French musician.

=== 25 ===
- Pierre Apraxine, 88, Estonian-born American art historian.
- Torbjörn Axelman, 90, Swedish television producer, director, and writer.
- Victor Babiuc, 84, Romanian jurist and politician, MP (1990, 1992–2004) and minister of national defence (1996–2000).
- Beverley Lawrence Beech, 78, Welsh author and home birth activist, pancreatic cancer.
- Jack Billion, 83, American politician, member of the South Dakota House of Representatives (1993–1997).
- Wayne Burtt, 78, New Zealand cricketer (Canterbury, Central Districts).
- Ernest L. Daman, 99, German-born American mechanical engineer, inventor, and business executive, president of the American Society of Mechanical Engineers (1988–1989).
- John P. Fackler Jr., 88, American inorganic chemist.
- Walter Ferguson, 103, Panamanian-born Costa Rican calypso singer-songwriter.
- François Hadji-Lazaro, 66, French actor (Cemetery Man, The City of Lost Children, Dante 01), musician and producer, sepsis.
- Allan Hotchkin, 79, Australian footballer (South Melbourne).
- Kris Jordan, 46, American politician, member of the Ohio House of Representatives (2009–2010, since 2019) and Senate (2011–2018), diabetic reaction.
- Max King, 92–93, American theologian.
- Sir David Lumsden, 94, British musician and choirmaster.
- Corinna Miazga, 39, German politician, member of the Bundestag (since 2017), breast cancer.
- Fred Miller, 82, American football player (Baltimore Colts).
- Rusty Mitchell, 80, American Olympic gymnast (1964).
- Dave Nicholson, 83, American baseball player (Baltimore Orioles, Chicago White Sox, Houston Astros).
- Jerry Olson, 89, American football coach.
- François Engongah Owono, 77, Gabonese politician, MP (2001–2006).
- Sixtus Josef Parzinger, 91, Austrian-Chilean Roman Catholic prelate, bishop of Villarrica (2001–2009).
- Martin Pěnička, 53, Czech footballer (Slavia Prague, Lokeren, Stavo Artikel Brno).
- Gordon Pinsent, 92, Canadian actor (Away from Her, Babar, The Red Green Show), cerebral hemorrhage.
- Dieter Pürschel, 82, German Olympic ice hockey player (1968).
- Carl Saunders, 80, American jazz trumpeter, composer and educator.
- Mitsuo Senda, 82, Japanese voice actor (Golgo 13, Sherlock Hound, Naruto), heart failure.
- Mihai Șora, 106, Romanian philosopher, essayist, and politician, minister of teaching (1989–1990).
- Traute, Princess of Lippe, 98, German princess.
- Richard Trefry, 98, American army lieutenant general, inspector general of the U.S. Army (1977–1983).
- Ali Yafie, 96, Indonesian Islamic scholar, chairman of the Indonesian Ulema Council (1990–2000).

=== 26 ===
- Ali Al-Baghli, 76, Kuwaiti politician, minister of oil (1992–1996).
- Béchir Ben Slama, 91, Tunisian politician, minister of culture (1981–1986).
- Betty Boothroyd, Baroness Boothroyd, 93, British politician, member (1973–2000) and speaker (1992–2000) of the House of Commons and member of the House of Lords (since 2001).
- Julian Christopher, 78, American actor (The Magician, Smallville, Upload).
- Helmut Gneuss, 95, German Anglo-Saxon and Latin manuscript scholar.
- Alberto Mario González, 81, Argentine footballer (Boca Juniors, national team).
- Terry Holland, 80, American basketball coach (Davidson Wildcats, Virginia Cavaliers), complications from Alzheimer's disease.
- Ian Hunter, 75, Northern Irish artist and art curator.
- Mandy Jenkins, 42, American journalist, co-founder of Fusion, breast cancer.
- Ted Knap, 102, American journalist.
- Jim Lewis, 88, British racehorse owner (Best Mate), kidney failure.
- Günther von Lojewski, 87, German journalist, television presenter, and author.
- Mário Lucunde, 65, Angolan Roman Catholic prelate, bishop of Menongue (2005–2018).
- Curzio Maltese, 63, Italian journalist (la Repubblica, La Gazzetta dello Sport) and politician, MEP (2014–2019).
- Eduardo Mendúa, c. 39, Ecuadorian Cofán indigenous leader, environmentalist, and land rights activist, shot.
- Gus Franklin Mutscher, 90, American politician, speaker of the Texas House of Representatives (1969–1972).
- Tony O'Donoghue, 86, Irish sports commentator.
- Valeria Ogășanu, 76, Romanian actress (Michael the Brave, The Yellow Rose).
- Francisco Osorto, 65, Salvadoran footballer (Santiagueño, Municipal Limeño, national team), liver failure.
- Barbara Paulson, 94, American human computer.
- Tom Pendry, Baron Pendry, 88, British politician, MP (1970–2001) and member of the House of Lords (since 2001).
- Shahida Raza, Pakistani field hockey player (national team), boat accident.
- Bob Richards, 97, American pole vaulter and politician, Olympic champion (1952, 1956).
- Amy Schwartz, 68, American author and illustrator.
- Ziya Şengül, 78–79, Turkish footballer (Fenerbahçe, national team), organ failure.
- Fred Shabel, 90, American basketball coach (UConn Huskies).
- Mohammed Stuart, 77, Namibian politician, member of the National Assembly (1990–1999).
- Morris Tanenbaum, 94, American physical chemist.
- Sandy Valdespino, 84, Cuban baseball player (Minnesota Twins, Atlanta Braves, Milwaukee Brewers).
- Johnnie Walters, 90, Canadian broadcaster and television personality.
- Ans Westra, 86, Dutch-born New Zealand photographer (Washday at the Pa).
- Kieron Wood, 73, Irish author, journalist, and barrister.

=== 27 ===
- Nobuo Ariga, 58, Japanese singer-songwriter, bassist, and record producer, prostate cancer.
- Jean Balfour, 95, Scottish forester, landowner and conservationist.
- Chester Borrows, 65, New Zealand politician, MP (2005–2017), minister for courts (2011–2014), deputy speaker of the House of Representatives (2014–2017), cancer.
- Ricou Browning, 93, American actor (Creature from the Black Lagoon, Revenge of the Creature) and television director (Flipper).
- Ron Brownson, 70-71, New Zealand art curator.
- Eduardo Burguete, 61, Spanish Olympic pentathlete (1984).
- Srutimala Duara, 57, Indian writer, ovarian cancer.
- Wolfgang Dudda, 65, German politician, member of the Landtag of Schleswig-Holstein (2012–2017).
- Paul East, 76, New Zealand politician, MP (1978–1999), attorney-general (1990–1997) and minister of defence (1996–1997).
- Royston Ellis, 82, English novelist, travel writer and poet, heart failure.
- Sir Anthony Hartwell, 82, British mariner and aristocrat.
- Koo Kwang-ming, 96, Taiwanese independence activist.
- Gérard Latortue, 88, Haitian politician, prime minister (2004–2006) and foreign minister (1988), fall.
- Li Yining, 92, Chinese economist.
- Óscar López Balestra, 88, Uruguayan politician, deputy (1972–1973, 1985–1990).
- Burny Mattinson, 87, American animator (The Great Mouse Detective, Robin Hood) and screenwriter (Beauty and the Beast).
- Don McGowan, 85, Canadian television personality
- Tom McLeish, 60, British theoretical physicist.
- Juan Muñoz, 93, Spanish children's author (El Barco de Vapor).
- Gleb Pavlovsky, 71, Russian political scientist.
- Bluey Scott, 93, Australian motorcycle speedway rider.
- Shen Zulun, 91, Chinese politician, governor of Zhejiang (1988–1990).
- Filipp Sidorsky, 85, Russian diplomat, ambassador to Uzbekistan (1992–1997) and to Bosnia and Herzegovina (1998–2000).
- Jerry Simmons, 76, American tennis coach (LSU Tigers).
- Chrysostomos A. Sofianos, 83, Cypriot educator and politician, co-founder of CNTI.
- Juha Valjakkala, 57, Finnish convicted murderer.
- Ed Weber, 91, American politician, member of the United States House of Representatives (1981–1983).
- Sammy Winston, 44, English footballer (Tottenham Hotspur, Leyton Orient).

=== 28 ===
- Dennis Aase, 81, American race car driver.
- Abdoh Besisi, 45, Saudi Arabian footballer (Al Ahli, Al-Ansar, Ohod).
- Michael Botticelli, 63, American Olympic figure skater (1980).
- Yvonne Constant, 92, French actress (Gigot, Monkeys, Go Home!, Their Last Night), singer and ballerina.
- Bay Darnell, 91, American racing driver.
- John T. Dillon, 84, American businessman, chairman of the International Paper (1996–2003).
- Brian J. Donnelly, 76, American politician and diplomat, member of the U.S. House of Representatives (1979–1993) and ambassador to Trinidad and Tobago (1994–1997).
- Jean Faut, 98, American baseball player (South Bend Blue Sox).
- Maurencia Gillion, South African politician, member of the National Council of Provinces (since 2019).
- Jimmy Hatton, 88, Irish Gaelic footballer and hurler (Kilcoole, Wicklow GAA).
- Bo Hickey, 77, American football player (Montreal Alouettes, Brooklyn Dodgers, Denver Broncos).
- Wsevolod W. Isajiw, 89, Ukrainian-born Canadian sociologist and scholar.
- Jay Arlen Jones, 69, American actor (The Patriot, Eight Legged Freaks, Extreme Justice).
- John Jordan, 73, American woodturner.
- Geneviève Lhermitte, 56, Belgian convicted murderer, assisted suicide.
- Lu Gongxun, 89, Chinese politician, deputy (1993–2003).
- Fred Marolewski, 94, American baseball player (St. Louis Cardinals).
- Pelayo Novo, 32, Spanish footballer (Oviedo, Elche), train collision.
- Brian O'Brien, 83, Irish rugby union player (national team) and manager.
- Pirouz, 10 months, Iranian Asiatic cheetah, kidney failure.
- Giovanni Prezioso, 65, American lawyer.
- Tony Scherman, 72, Canadian painter, cancer.
- Javad Tabatabai, 77, Iranian philosopher and political scientist.
- Indrek Toome, 79, Estonian politician, chairman of the Council of Ministers (1988–1990).
- Grant Turner, 64, New Zealand footballer (Stop Out, national team), cancer.
- Jay Weston, 93, American film producer (Lady Sings the Blues, Buddy Buddy).
