= Baxtiyor Sayfullayev =

Uzbek politician (1951–2023)

Member of the Senate of Uzbekistan
- In office 18 January 2020 – 14 February 2023

Minister of Culture
- In office 2012–2020
- Preceded by: Minhojiddin Hojimatov
- Succeeded by: Ozodbek Nazarbekov

Personal details
- Born: 1 April 1951 Tashkent, Uzbek SSR, USSR
- Died: 14 February 2023 (aged 71)
- Party: Independent
- Education: State Institute of Arts and Culture of Uzbekistan

Baxtiyor Sayfullayevich Sayfullayev (1 April 1951 – 14 February 2023) was an Uzbek politician. An independent, he served as Minister of Culture from 2012 to 2020 and was a Senator from 2020 until his death in 2023.

Sayfullayev died on 14 February 2023, at the age of 71.
