= Abdelkader Drif =

Algerian sporting director (1937–2023)

- Born: March 1937; Vialar, French Algeria
- Died: 7 February 2023 (aged 85)
- Occupation: Sporting director

Abdelkader Drif (March 1937 – 7 February 2023) was an Algerian sporting director.

== Biography ==
Born in Vialar (Tissemsilt) in March 1937, Drif was raised in a prominent family. In 1950, he moved with his family to Algiers. He was married to Belgaïd Ghania, with whom he had one daughter.

Drif became the President of multi-sport club Mouloudia Club d'Alger. He was the first club president in Algeria to lead his team to African Cup of Champions Clubs against the Guinean club, Hafia FC, at the Stade du 5 Juillet in 1976.

Drif died on 7 February 2023, at the age of 85.
