= Thierry Alla =

French composer and musicologist (1955–2023)

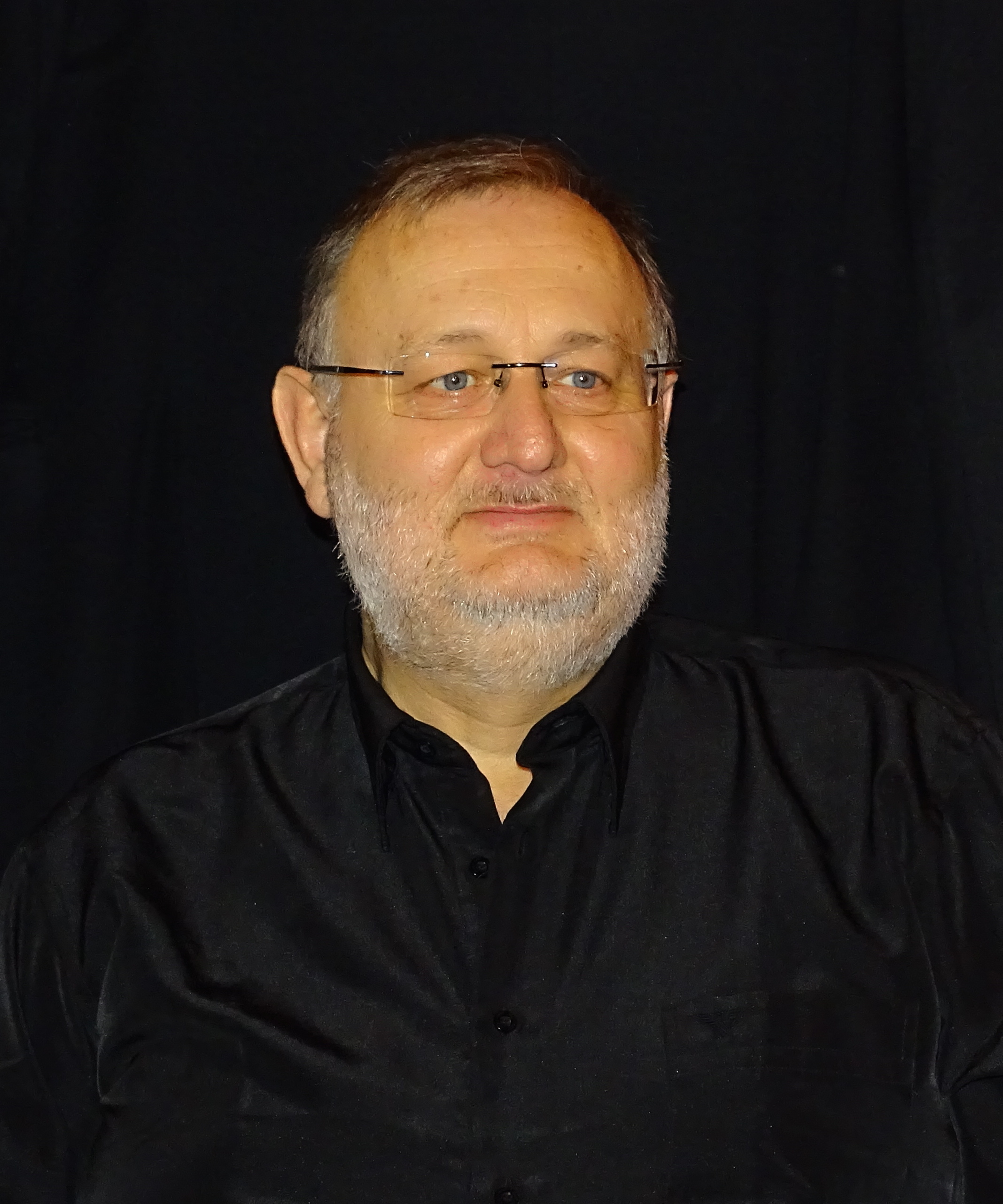
- Alla in 2016
- Born: 24 March 1955; Algiers, French Algeria
- Died: 13 February 2023 (aged 67); Fronsac, Gironde, France
- Education: University of Tours; University of Rouen Normandy; Conservatoire de Bordeaux; Paris-Sorbonne University
- Occupations: Composer; Musicologist

Thierry Alla (24 March 1955 – 13 February 2023) was a French composer and musicologist.

== Biography ==
Born in Algiers on 24 March 1955, Alla studied musicology at the University of Tours under the direction of Jean-Michel Vaccaro. He continued his studies at the Conservatoire of Bordeaux, where he earned the first prize in musical competition in 1988. In 1990, he took part in international courses in Darmstadt, as well as a competition at the Conservatoire de Paris. He earned a Master of Advanced Studies from Paris-Sorbonne University before defending his doctoral thesis on the music of Tristan Murail at the University of Rouen Normandy. His thesis, Tristan Murail, la couleur sonore, was published by the Éditions Michel de Maule.

In addition to musicology, Alla published articles on spectral music. He obtained several commissions to publish work in France and abroad. In 2017, a biographical work written by Pierre-Albert Castanet and published by Éditions Delatour was dedicated to him.

Thierry Alla died in Fronsac, Gironde on 13 February 2023, at the age of 67.

== Works ==
- Hypnose (1986)
- Transparence (1987)
- Etna (1987)
- Trimaran (1988)
- Sources (1988)
- Rencontres (1988)
- Drama (1989)
- Concerto-Etoiles (1989)
- Lunaire (1990)
- Offshore (1990)
- Luz (1992)
- Eclisses (1993)
- Polychrome (1993)
- Spot (1993)
- Aérienne (1994)
- Digital (1995)
- Recordare (1996)
- Récifs (1997)
- Tempus fugit (1998)
- Triedre (1998)
- Toiles (1998)
- Confluences (1999)
- Voix-Visages (2000)
- Artificiel (2001)
- Desde lo Hondo (2002)
- Chanvre (2002)
- Abyssal (2003)
- Sourcier-Sorcière (2005)
- Instantanés (2006)
- Trichromie (2006)
- Chant de l'éveil (2009)
- Sanctuaire (2009)
- Songes (2011)
- Rouages (2011)
- Birds (2011)
- Ancestral (2012)
- Chaman (2012)
- Discoïdal (2012)
- Transversal (2013)
- Souffle Nacré (2014)
- Parietal (2014)
- Inaugural (2015)
- Stress (2015)
- In Darkness (2017)
- Océan (2018)
- L'eau pure (2018)
- Offrande (2022)
