= John Jordan (woodturner) =

American woodworker (1950–2023)

- Born: John Jordan; February 28, 1950; Nashville, TN
- Died: February 28, 2023 (aged 73); Nashville, TN
- Occupation: Woodturner
- Spouse(s): Vicki Jordan, m.1977
- Children: John Jr., Matthew, and Jennifer
- Website: johnjordanwoodturning.com

John Jordan (February 28, 1950 — February 28, 2023) was an American woodturner, known for his textured and carved hollow vessels and small necked bottles, his teaching and demonstrations around the world, and his tool designs.

== Life ==
John, an artist and woodturner from Cane Ridge, Nashville, Tennessee, had no formal arts education. He became interested in woodworking in the late ’70s, first making furniture and then turned to woodturning in the early ’80s.

Jordan's turned vessels were exhibited in nearly every major woodturning show from 1993 to 2023. He was a very popular woodturning demonstrator and teacher, teaching at universities, craft schools, turning groups and trade shows throughout the US, Canada, the UK, France, Japan, New Zealand and Australia.

In 2012 he was became a Lifetime AAW (American Association of Woodturners) Honorary Member

== Publications ==
His publications include:

- Wood Turning (Art of Woodworking), Time Life Education, January 1994
- Aesthetics & Properties of Wood by John Jordan - 2 DVD
- John Jordan: A Turned and Textured Vessel
- "Carve and Texture a Hollow Form Like John Jordan" Woodturning Magazine - Issue 200 - 2009
- "How_to_create_the_perfect_hollow_form_199_total.pdf"How to Create the Perfect Hollow Form" Woodturning Magazine - Issue 199 - 2009H
- "How to Orientate Wood for Maximum Visual Impact" - John Jordan Woodturning Magazine - Issue 198 - 2009
- "Side Ground Gouges "Side Ground Gouges" - John Jordan American Woodturner - March 1994
- "Textured Candleholder" - John Jordan Woodturning Magazine - Issue 246 - 2012
- "True to Form" - John Jordan 2012 AAW Honorary Lifetime Member American Woodturner - Kevin Wallace
- "Turned and Carved Hollow Vessel" - John Jordan American Woodturner - Spring 2009
- "Turned and Carved Vessels" - John Jordan Fine Woodworking - 1990 No. 85
- "Understanding Green Wood" - John Jordan American Woodturner - 1998

== Museums ==
John’s turned and carved vessels are featured in numerous private and corporate collections, as well as the Public Collections of more than thirty museums, including:

- White House Collection of American Crafts, Monroe, Michael G.
- Renwick Gallery of the Smithsonian
- High Museum of Art in Atlanta
- American Craft Museum in New York City
- Los Angeles County Museum of Art
- Mint Museum of Craft + Design in Charlotte
- Fine Arts Museum in Boston
- Detroit Institute of the Arts
- Victoria and Albert Museum in London, England
