= Pierre-Alain Parot =

French stained-glass artist (1950–2023)

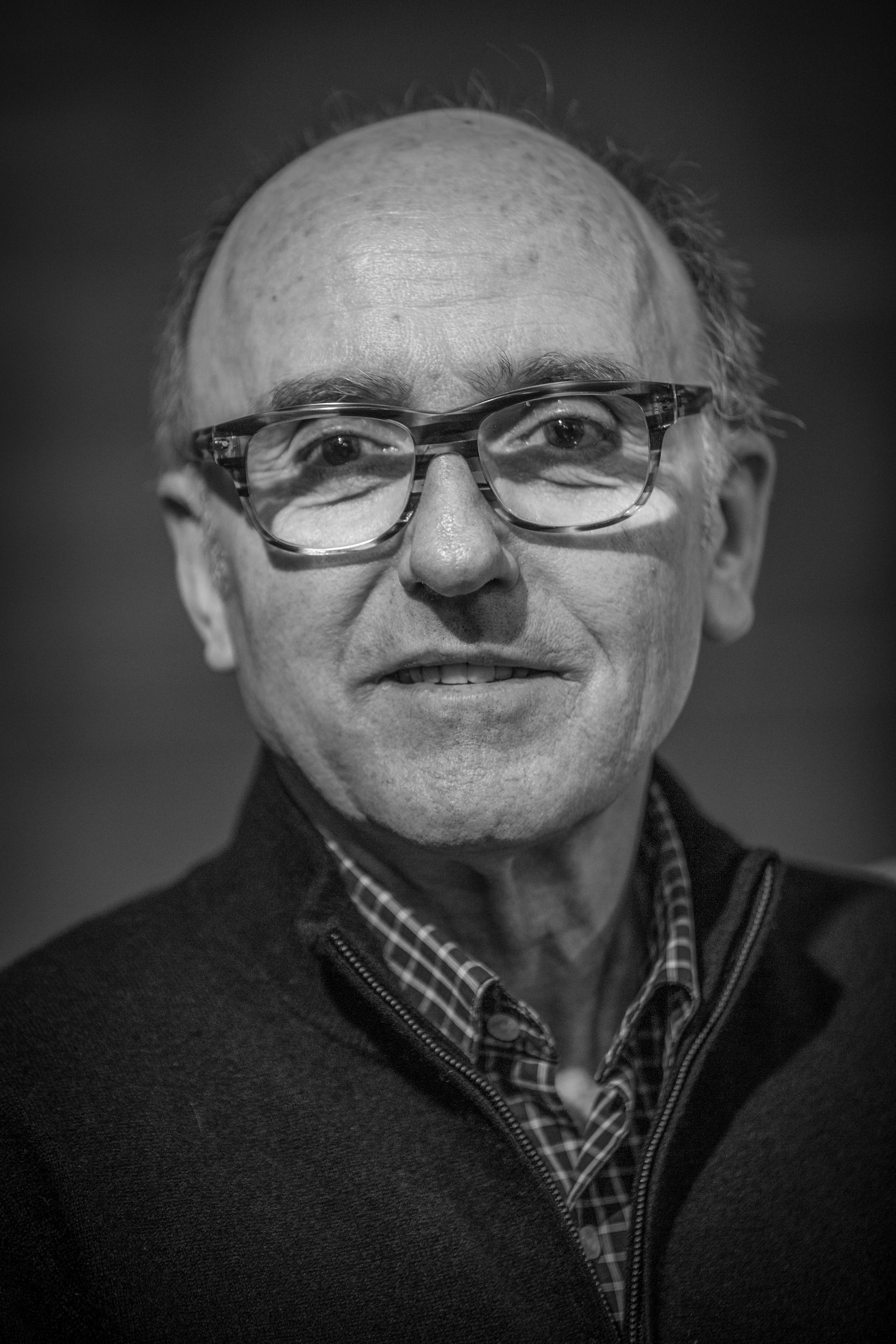
- Parot in 2014
- Born: 27 April 1950; Dijon, France
- Died: 6 February 2023 (aged 72); Aiserey, France
- Education: Beaux-Arts School of Dijon
- Occupation: Stained-glass artist

Pierre-Alain Parot (27 April 1950 – 6 February 2023) was a French stained-glass artist.

== Biography ==
Born in Dijon on 27 April 1950, Parot learned stained-glass art in the workshop of his father, Marcel Parot. After his studies at the Beaux-Arts School of Dijon, he took over his father's workshop in 1972. He spent his time on the restoration of old stained glass windows in collaboration with the likes of Gérard Garouste, Jean Ricardon, and Véronique Ellena, as well as the creation of new stained glass windows. His workshop was situated at the Château d'Aiserey, south of Dijon.

In 2016, Parot was awarded the Prix Liliane-Bettencourt pour l'intelligence de la main. In 2019, he helped to restore stained-glass windows impacted by the Notre-Dame fire.

Pierre-Alain Parot died on 6 February 2023, at the age of 72.

== Works ==
- 14 stained-glass windows of the Église de Saint-Avit-Sénieur
- Restoration of the millennium stained-glass window of the Strasbourg Cathedral
- Église Notre-Dame de Talant
- Stained-glass window in the left transept of the Tours Cathedral
