= Géza Bejek =

Hungarian gymnast

- Born: 20 April 1934 Székesfehérvár, Hungary
- Died: 17 February 2023 (aged 88)
- Height: 1.63 m (5 ft 4 in)
- Spouse: Klára Förstner

Gymnastics career
- Discipline: Men's artistic gymnastics
- Country represented: Hungary
- Club: Újpesti Tornaegylet

Géza Bejek (20 April 1934 – 17 February 2023) was a Hungarian gymnast. He competed in eight events at the 1960 Summer Olympics.
