= Ferhat Ozcep =

Turkish geophysicist (1968–2023)

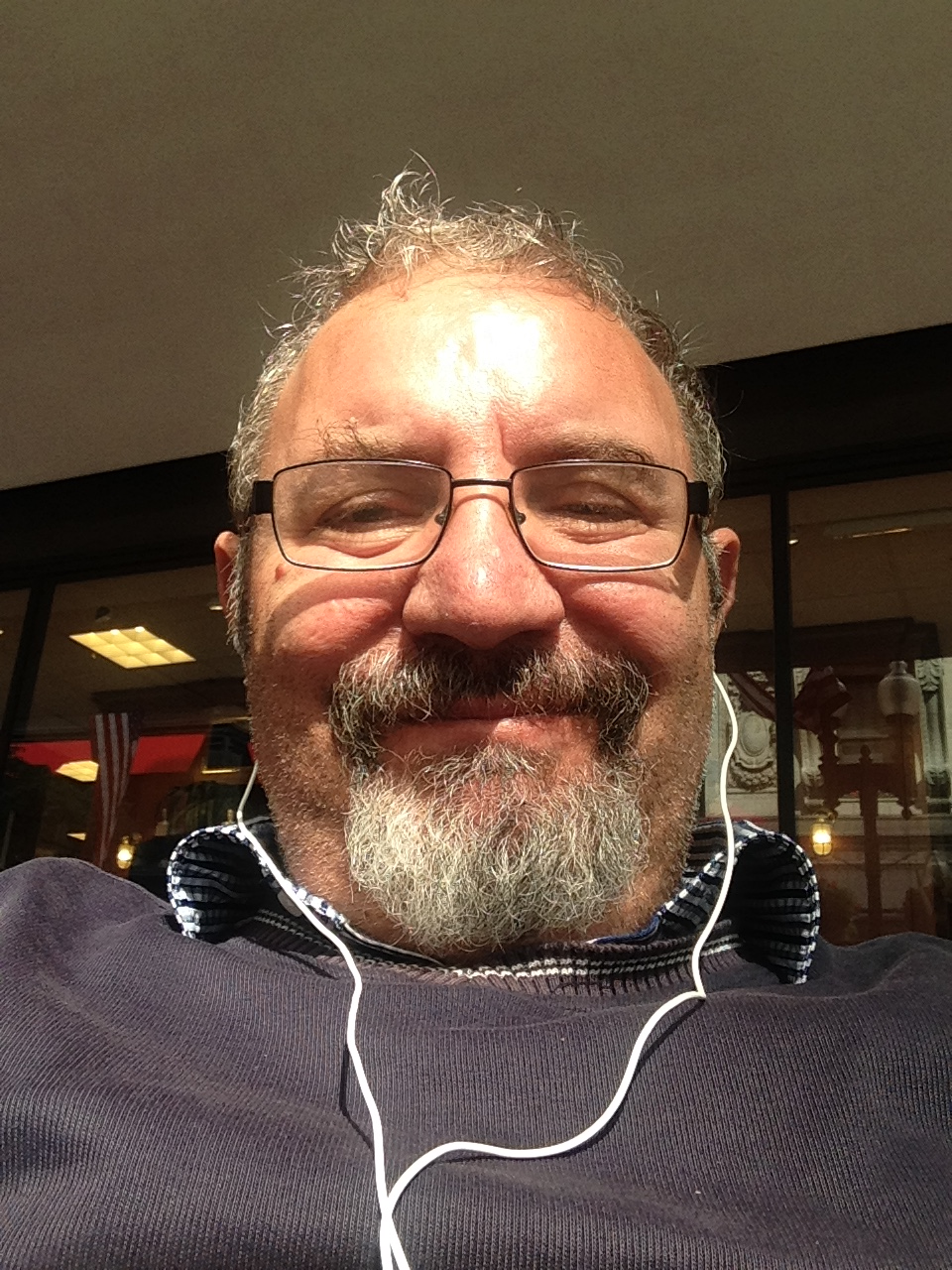
- Ozcep in 2017
- Born: 23 January 1968; Zonguldak, Turkey
- Died: 9 February 2023 (aged 55); Istanbul, Turkey
- Citizenship: Turkey
- Education: University of Istanbul (B.Sc., M.Sc., Ph.D.); Hacettepe University (Pre-Licence Degree))
- Scientific career
- Fields: Geophysics, History of Science
- Workplaces: University of Istanbul; University of Cambridge; Harvard University Istanbul University-Cerrahpaşa
- Website: aves.istanbul.edu.tr/ferozcep/katalog

Ferhat Ozcep (23 January 1968 – 9 February 2023) was a geophysicist and historian of science in Turkey. He was born in Zonguldak, Turkey, on 23 January 1968. He was a visiting scholar in the Department of the Science at Harvard University. He was professor of geophysics at Istanbul University.

He received the B.Sc. degree in geophysical engineering from University of Istanbul in 1991 and the Pre-Bachelor's (Associate) degree in Electrical Engineering Technician Program from Hacettepe University in 1992. He received the M.Sc. degree in geophysical engineering from University of Istanbul in 1994. He received the Ph.D. degree in geophysics from University of Istanbul in 1999. Between 1992 and 2004 years, he was a research assistant in Department of Geophysical Engineering, at University of Istanbul. In 1994 and 1996, he was elected a member (as a general secretary) of executive committee of Istanbul Branch of “Chamber of Geophysical Engineers” that is the only geophysical society in Turkey. Between 2006 and 2008, he was a member of executive committee of “Union of Chambers of Turkish Engineers and Architects”. He was selected as a member of History of Geophysics Committee, American Geophysical Union for the term 1 July 2002 to 30 June 2004. He was also a member of Geophysical Engineering Committee of ASCE

He was a member of American Geophysical Union, European Geosciences Union, Deutsche Geophysikalische Geselschaft (German Geophysical Society), American Society of Civil Engineers (ASCE), Chamber of Geophysical Engineers of Turkey, Earthquake Engineering Association of Turkey, and Turkish Society for History of Science.

His research interests in geophysics focussed on a wide range of topics: “Geotechnical Earthquake Engineering”, “Soil Dynamics”, “Seismic Microzonation”, “Paleomagnetism-Geomagnetism”, “Tectonophysics (Geodynamics)”, “Electromagnetic Techniques”, “Archeogeophysics”, “Exploration and Protection of the Nature (Environmental Geophysics)”, and “History and Philosophy of Science”.

He was a visiting scholar in the Department of History and Philosophy of Science at University of Cambridge for Lent term 2015, where he attended seminars and lectures run by the department and made use of the department and university's facilities. Whilst he was in the department, his sponsor was Professor Jim Secord.

While at Harvard, Prof. Ozcep was to conduct research on the “Investigation on Geophysical Ideas and Measurements in Ottoman Geography in Transition from Pre-Modern (Islamic) to Modern (Western) Periods.”

He was named co-chair of Department of Geophysical Engineering at Istanbul University-Cerrahpaşa in July 2018.

== Books ==
- F. Ozcep and N. Orbay, 2002, Geophysics and its Historical Development, in Turkish,446 pages, Istanbul University Pub., No: 4347, Istanbul.
- F. Ozcep, 2005, Soil Behaviour under Static and Dynamic Loads, and Engineering Applications, in Turkish, Publication of Chamber of Geophysical Engineers of Turkey, 237 pages, ISBN No: 975-395-974-5, Ankara.
- F. Ozcep, 2006, Static and Dynamic Analysis of Soils, in Turkish, Publication of Chamber of Geophysical Engineers of Turkey., ISBN No: 9944-89-195-9, 551 pages, Ankara.
- F. Ozcep, 2007, Microzonation: Principles and Applications, in Turkish, Publication of Chamber of Geophysical Engineers of Turkey., 211 pages, ISBN No: 978-9944-89-231-5, Ankara.
- F. Ozcep, 2009, Geotechnical and Geophysical Analysis of Soils, in Turkish, Nobel Publications, 609 pages, ISBN No: 978-605-395-177-3, Ankara.
- F. Ozcep, 2016, Slope Stability (with Theory and Applications for Seismic and Aseismic Loads), in Turkish, Publication of Chamber of Geophysical Engineers of Turkey, 99 pages, ISBN No: 978-605-01-0856-9, Ankara.
- F. Ozcep, Z.M. Hisarli, Editors, 2017, 90 Yılın Ardından İstanbul Üniversitesi'nde Jeofiziğin Serüveni, Literatur Yayincilik, ISBN 9789750407574, Istanbul
