= Mohammed Stuart =

Namibian politician (died 2023)

Mohammed "Dino" Stuart
- Born: 1945/1946; Walvis Bay, South West Africa
- Died: 26 February 2023 (aged 77); Namibia
- Occupation: Member of Parliament

Mohammed "Dino" Stuart (1945/1946 – 26 February 2023) was a Namibian politician who served as a member of the National Assembly of Namibia with the opposition Democratic Turnhalle Alliance.

Stuart died on 26 February 2023, at the age of 77.
