= W. Russell Todd =

United States Army general (1928–2023)

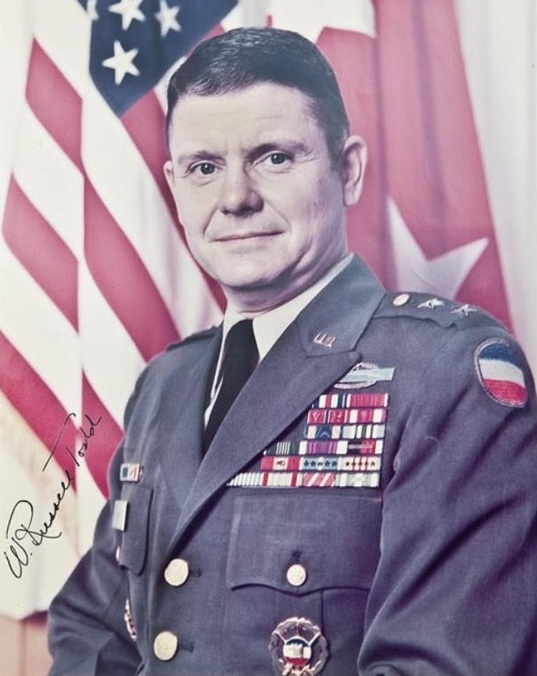
- Todd as Forces Command's Deputy Chief of Staff for Operations, 1975
- Born: May 1, 1928; Seattle, Washington, U.S.
- Died: February 12, 2023 (aged 94) Fairfax, Virginia, U.S.
- Allegiance: United States of America
- Branch: United States Army
- Rank: Major general
- Commands: 1st Cavalry Division

William Russell Todd (May 1, 1928 – February 12, 2023) was a United States Army major general who served as commander of the 1st Cavalry Division from 1976 to 1978. He graduated from Norwich University in 1950, and was the university's president from 1982 to 1992.

== Biography ==
Todd was born in Seattle, Washington, on May 1, 1928. He graduated from Norwich University in 1950, and received his commission as a second lieutenant of cavalry in the United States Army. He led an Armor platoon in Korea during the Korean War.

In 1964, Todd received a master of business administration degree from the University of Alabama. He subsequently commanded 1st Battalion, 63rd Armor Regiment, after which he attended the Naval War College. After graduating, he commanded 3rd Brigade, 25th Infantry Division in Vietnam during the Vietnam War.

From November 1976 to November 1978, Todd was commander of the 1st Cavalry Division. In 1972, Todd lead the modern volunteer Army office at the Pentagon, overseeing the transition from a drafted Army to an all-volunteer force. In 1982, he became president of Norwich University. He remained in this position until retiring in 1992.

Todd died on February 12, 2023, at the age of 94.
