= Sham Binda =

Surinamese entrepreneur and politician (1953–2023)

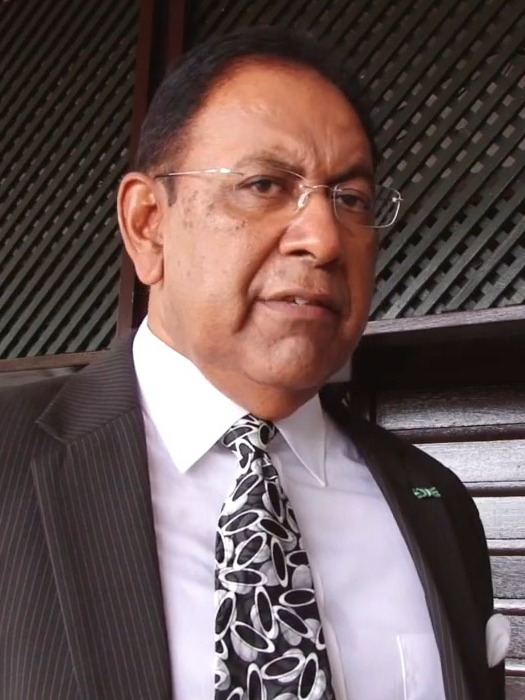
- Binda in 2020

Member of the National Assembly of Suriname
- In office 25 May 2020 – 16 February 2023

Personal details
- Born: 14 October 1953
- Died: 16 February 2023 (aged 69)
- Party: VHP
- Occupation: Entrepreneur

Sham Swami Dewanan Binda (14 October 1953 – 16 February 2023) was a Surinamese entrepreneur and politician. A member of the Progressive Reform Party, he served in the National Assembly from 2020 to 2023.

Binda died on 16 February 2023, at the age of 69.
