= Terry Rodgers (footballer) =

Australian rules footballer (1943–2023)

Personal information
- Full name: Terry Keith Rodgers
- Born: 25 January 1943
- Died: 18 February 2023 (aged 80)
- Original teams: University High, Essendon District FL
- Height: 180 cm (5 ft 11 in)
- Weight: 76 kg (168 lb)
- Position: Half-forward

Playing career^{1}
| Years | Club | Games (Goals) |
| 1961–64 | Essendon | 38 (42) |
- ^{1} Playing statistics correct to the end of 1964.

Terry Keith Rodgers (25 January 1943 – 18 February 2023) was an Australian rules footballer who played with Essendon in the Victorian Football League (VFL). He missed Essendon's victorious 1962 premiership team due to an injury he received at training. Rodgers later played for Alexandra.

Rodgers died on 18 February 2023, at the age of 80.
