= John Ward (potter) =

British potter (1938–2023)

John Ward (22 November 1938 – 14 February 2023) was a British studio potter.

== Life and career ==
Born in 1938 in Islington, London, Ward was the second of three sons of butcher George Ward and Marjorie Lay, who also worked at the butchers. His early education at a local primary school and Haberdasher Aske's grammar school in New Cross did not include arts and crafts. Instead, Ward was urged to study maths and physics.

Ward's interest in pottery was sparked by a primary school trip to a pottery where he modelled figures that were later glazed. While visiting Fairlight Glen as a child, he found deposits of clay on the beach, which resulted in experiments with the clay at home. After leaving school, Ward worked briefly at a soap factory in Wapping, before becoming a studio cameraman at the BBC.

It was during his time at the BBC that Ward took evening classes in ceramics. In 1966, he applied to Camberwell School of Arts & Crafts, where he developed his particular approach to building pots under the tutelage of Dick Kendall, Colin Pearson, John Minshaw, and Ian Godfrey, whom he especially admired. Although the Camberwell did not teach students the use of flat coils, it became Ward's signature style. Ward believed that glaze and form should work in concert, which informed his signature use of muted colour matt glazes.

Ward ran a pottery training centre in Sydenham for nine years, during which time he began exhibiting his ceramics at galleries such as Primavera. He moved to Pembrokeshire, Wales in 1979. In the 1980s, Ward's work started to be sold at auction for high prices. Despite this, Ward never increased the prices of his work in galleries and was not interested in the commercial aspects of his work.

Ward died at the age of 84 on 14 February 2023.

== Recognition ==
Ward's pots have been exhibited in numerous solo and group shows in the UK and abroad. He received several honors, including the gold medal for Ceramics from the Royal Society of Arts in 2011 and an honorary doctorate from the University of the West of England in 2017. His works are held in public collections, including the Victoria and Albert Museum in London, the Fitzwilliam Museum in Cambridge, and the Museum Boijmans Van Beuningen in Rotterdam.

== Style ==
Ward's stoneware pots, which he hand-built using flattened strips of clay and decorated with a range of matt glazes, represent a continuous evolution of a series of fundamental forms such as the bowl, the shouldered pot, the gourd-shaped jar, and the disc-shaped vessel. Ward's pots were not created with a prescribed function, which allowed him to experiment with a broader range of hollow shapes.

Despite Ward's experimental approach, he considered himself a potter in a continuous tradition of ceramic vessels reaching back into our furthest human history. His best works, according to ceramics historian and critic David Whiting, "speak eloquently of the limitless language of the bowl and the globular jar, their sculptural and metaphorical resonances."
