= César Cordero Moscoso =

Ecuadorian Roman Catholic priest and child abuser (1927–2023)

- Born: César Augusto Cordero Moscoso; 7 June 1927; Cuenca, Ecuador
- Died: 4 February 2023 (aged 95); Cuenca, Ecuador
- Education: University of Cuenca
- Occupation: Catholic priest

César Augusto Cordero Moscoso (7 June 1927 – 4 February 2023) was an Ecuadorian Roman Catholic priest and child abuser.

He was the founder of the Universidad Católica de Cuenca, of which he served as rector from 1970 to 2013. In 2010, he was accused of multiple counts of child sexual abuse which occurred 50 years earlier. He was defrocked on 4 October 2018 but escaped any criminal charges.

== Biography ==
Born in Cuenca on 7 June 1927, Cordero was the son of a lawyer and became an orphan at a young age. He was also the grandson of former President of Ecuador Luis Cordero Crespo.

After attending the University of Cuenca, Cordero was ordained a priest on 8 November 1953. In 1970, he founded the Universidad Católica de Cuenca alongside President José María Velasco Ibarra. He served as rector until 2013. In 1992, he was made an archimandrite by the Eastern Orthodox Church.

=== Accusations of sexual abuse ===
In 2010, Cordero was accused of child sexual abuse by Jorge Palacios, a 55-year-old man. The complaint had no legal followup and it resurfaced in 2018. After this complaint, several other accusations were made. The Vatican sent Jorge Ortiz de Lazcano, a Spanish priest living in Chile, to Ecuador to investigate the case after his investigation in the Karadima case. Cordero denied the allegations and declared that his accusers were "enemies of the Church" in addition to accusing Pope Francis of "lowering himself" by apologizing to his victims. The Vatican's investigation concluded that the allegations were credible, suspending Cordero from his activities and continuing the investigation at the Holy See.

In April 2018, the Cantonal Council of Cuenca awarded the Insignia Santa Ana de los Cuatro Ríos to Cordero. After facing much backlash, he did not accept his award due to "health reasons". On 28 May 2018, the monument dedicated to Cordero at the Universidad Católica de Cuenca was removed after repeated acts of vandalism. Two days later, the university withdrew his honorary titles despite the fact that he was the founder of the institution. On 11 June 2018, the Cantonal Council withdrew his Premio Hermano Miguel, which had been awarded to him in 1981. On 28 June, the Provincial Council of Azuay withdrew the Huayna Cápac medal, awarded to him in 2004.

On 4 October 2018, the Catholic Church dismissed Cordero from the clerical state "permanently and perpetually", the maximum penalty that can be applied by the Church in such cases.

=== Death ===
César Cordero Moscoso died in Cuenca on 4 February 2023, at the age of 95.
