= Esperanza Bravo de Varona =

American librarian (1927–2023)

- Born: September 29, 1927; Sancti Spirtus, Cuba
- Died: February 23, 2023 (aged 95)
- Education: University of Havana, Florida State University
- Occupations: Librarian, archivist
- Employer: University of Miami
- Spouse: Francisco Javier de Varona

Esperanza Bravo de Varona (September 29, 1927 – February 23, 2023) was a Cuban American librarian and archivist. During her 45-year tenure at the University of Miami Libraries, she would collaborate with other historians and archivists to develop out the Cuban Heritage Collection at the University of Miami's Libraries. The Cuban Heritage Collection was widely considered to be the largest repository of Cuban diaspora and the largest collection outside of Cuba itself at the time of her death.

== Early life ==
De Varona was born in Sancti Spirtus, Cuba, where she was the third of four children to Romulo Bravo and Armantina Lopez Calleja. Early in her life, she studied at the Volegio del Apostolado until she transferred to the University of Havana where she earned her Ph.D. in philosophy. She would meet her husband, Francisco Javier de Varona, in Havana in 1948. They would be wed on July 9, 1950, and would eventually have four children. They would continue to live in Cuba until Francisco found work in Santa Domingo. After moving, de Varona opted to fly back to Havana to have her third child there, so that they could inherit Cuban citizenship. However, shortly after this, the Cuban Communist Revolution in December 1958, forcing her and her daughter to return to Santo Domingo. Years after this, the Dominican Civil War would force her family to flee to the United States as refugees. They would end finding residence within Miami, Florida, where de Varona would complete her Masters of Library Science from Florida State University.

== Work as a Librarian ==
Following the completion of her Masters of Library Science, de Varona would begin working within the University Libraries division of the University of Miami in the late 1960s. In addition to other Cuban Americans who worked there, de Varona led efforts in collecting a variety of books, documents, and historical items that had any relevance to Cuba and the Cuban exile experience. These would eventually be assembled into the UM Libraries' Cuban Heritage Collection. The collection currently holds close to 50,000 volumes of contemporary and exceptional rare items in Spanish and English. These materials can have been published anywhere in the world, assuming they speak to the Cuban experience and the Cuban diaspora. Throughout the collection, there are thousands of periodicals, correspondence, historical and literary manuscripts, and even some entertainment and audio items. Prior to her retirement in 2013, de Varona served as the president of the Society of Florida Archivists and as a member of the State Historical Records Advisory Board. These roles were appointments by three consecutive Florida governors.
