= Ron Johnson (Australian footballer) =

Australian rules footballer (1938–2023)

Personal information
- Full name: Ronald Johnson
- Born: 20 May 1938
- Died: 15 February 2023 (aged 84)
- Original team: Richmond Amateurs
- Height: 170 cm (5 ft 7 in)
- Weight: 71 kg (157 lb)
- Position: Rover

Playing career^{1}
Years	Club	Games (Goals)
1961–62	Richmond	19 (16)
- ^{1} Playing statistics correct to the end of 1962.

Ronald Johnson (20 May 1938 – 15 February 2023) was an Australian rules footballer who played with Richmond in the Victorian Football League (VFL).

Johnson was a teacher in the Victorian Technical School system in the plumbing/sheet metal area. He was coach of the Burwood Technical School Year 7 & Year 8 Shell Lightning Premiership Teams taking the 1979 & 1980 teams to runners up in the State.
