= Our Friend Tili =

- Directed by: Fehmi Hoshafi
- Starring: Elida Janushi; Arben Latifi
- Cinematography: Pëllumb Kallfa
- Music by: Tasim Hoshafi
- Distributed by: Albafilm
- Release date: 1981
- Running time: 74 minutes
- Country: Albania
- Language: Albanian

Our Friend Tili (Albanian: Shoku ynë Tili) is a 1981 Albanian coming of age film directed by Fehmi Hoshafi and starring Elida Janushi, Arben Latifi, Lutfi Hoxha. It won a gold medal at the 1982 International Children's Film Festival in Salerno.

== Cast ==
- Elida Janushi
- Arben Latifi
- Lutfi Hoxha
- Zyliha Miloti
- Vasillaq Vangjeli
- Zef Bushati
- Mirketa Çobani
