= Jim Rose (artist) =

American sculptor

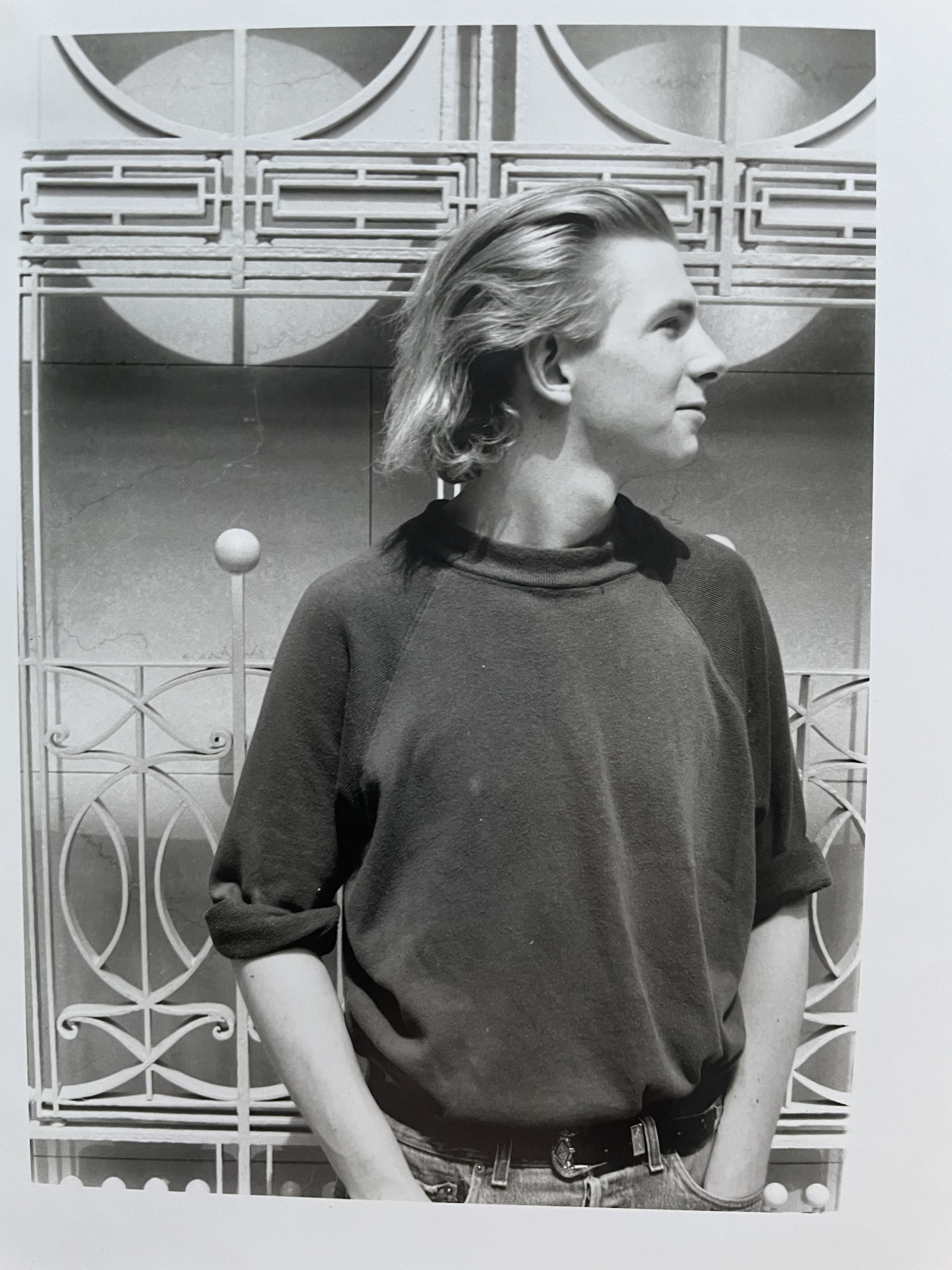

Jim Rose (March 29, 1966 - February 6, 2023) was an American sculptor who constructed steel furniture, decorative objects, and sculpture with steel reclaimed from scrapyards. Rose was born in Beech Grove, Indiana. He earned a BFA in sculpture from the School of the Art Institute of Chicago in 1988 and established a studio in Forestville, Wisconsin, in 1990. Over three decades, he created a body of work inspired by Shaker furniture, the quilts of Gee's Bend, and early Chinese furniture.

Rose's work is represented in numerous museums, including the Smithsonian American Art Museum (DC), Milwaukee Art Museum (WI), Carnegie Museum of Art (PA), Museum of Arts and Design (NY), and John Michael Kohler Arts Center (WI). His work has been featured in American Craft Magazine, Architectural Digest and Door County Living.

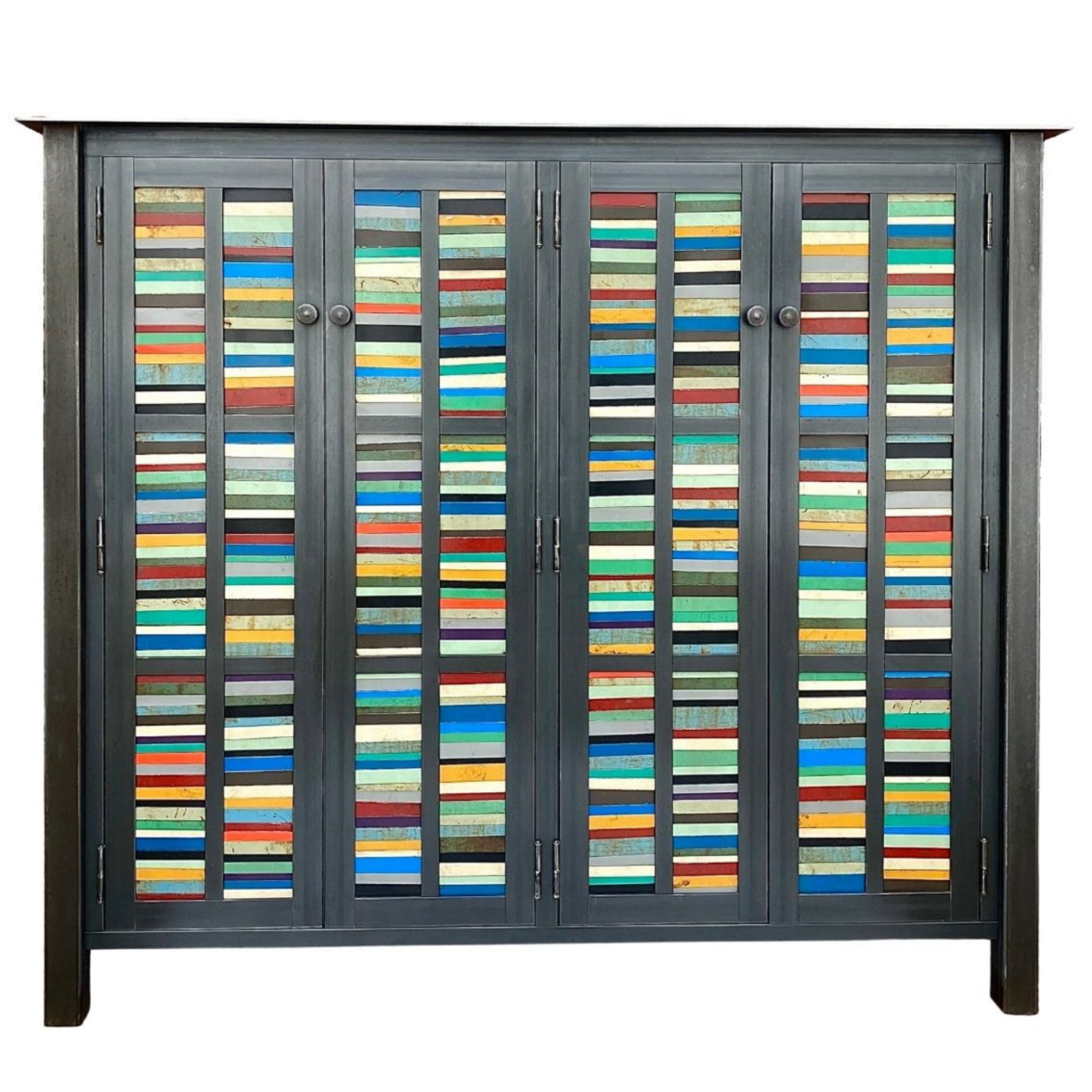
