= Ferenc Jánosi =

Hungarian volleyball player (1938–2023)

Personal information
- Nationality: Hungarian citizenship
- Born: 17 June 1938; Miskolc, Hungary
- Died: 19 February 2023 (aged 84); Budapest, Hungary

Sport
- Sport: Volleyball

Ferenc Jánosi (17 June 1938 – 19 February 2023) was a Hungarian volleyball player. He competed in the men's tournament at the 1964 Summer Olympics.

Jánosi died in Budapest on 19 February 2023, at the age of 84.
