= Xu Binshi =

Chinese engineer (1931–2023)

- 徐滨士
- Born: 12 March 1931; Harbin, Heilongjiang, China
- Died: 15 February 2023 (aged 91); China
- Education: Harbin Institute of Technology
- Scientific career
- Fields: Equipment maintenance surface engineering
- Workplaces: Harbin Military Academy of Engineering; Equipment Maintenance Surface Engineering Research Center of the People's Liberation Army

Chinese name
- Simplified Chinese: 徐滨士
- Traditional Chinese: 徐濱士
Transcriptions
Standard Mandarin
- Hanyu Pinyin: Xú Bīnshì

Xu Binshi (Chinese: 徐滨士; 12 March 1931 – 15 February 2023) was a Chinese engineer specializing in equipment maintenance surface engineering, and an academician of the Chinese Academy of Engineering.

== Biography ==
Xu was born in Harbin, Heilongjiang, on 12 March 1931, while his ancestral home is in Zhaoyuan County (now Zhaoyuan), Shandong. In 1947, he was admitted to Harbin Institute of Technology, where he majored in mechanical manufacturing and welding. After graduating in 1954, he was despatched to Harbin Military Academy of Engineering (now National University of Defense Technology), where he developed the first vibration arc surfacing equipment of China. He moved to the PLA Armored Corps Engineering Academy in 1961. He attained the rank of major general (shaojiang) in June 1990.

Xu died on 15 February 2023, at the age of 91.

== Honours and awards ==
- 1995 Member of the Chinese Academy of Engineering (CAE)
- Foreign Academician of the Polish Academy of Sciences (PAN)
