= Valeria Ogășanu =

Romanian actress (1946–2023)

- Born: 23 September 1946; Bucharest, Romania
- Died: 26 February 2023 (aged 76); Bucharest, Romania
- Occupation: Actress

Valeria Ogășanu (23 September 1946 – 26 February 2023), also known as Valeria Marian, was a Romanian actress.

== Early life ==
Ogășanu was born on 23 September 1946 in Bucharest, Romania. She graduated from the Institute of Theater Arts and Cinematography in 1969.

== Professional career ==
In 1968, Ogășanu played her first role in the film Here Come the Cyclists. Other notable film roles included The Miscellaneous Brigade Goes Into Action (1971), The Jderi Brothers (1974), and Alarma in delta (1975). She played on the stage of the "Bulandra" theater in Bucharest.

== Personal life ==
Ogășanu was married to actor Virgil Ogășanu. Together they had a son named Mihai Ogășanu.

== Death ==
Ogășanu died on 26 February 2023, at the age of 76.
