= Franc' Pairon =

Belgian fashion designer and teacher (1949–2023)

- Born: Francine Pairon; 2 February 1949
- Died: 12 February 2023 (aged 74); Ixelles, Belgium
- Education: College of Advertising and Design
- Occupations: Fashion designer Teacher

Francine "Franc'" Pairon (2 February 1949 – 12 February 2023) was a Belgian fashion designer and teacher. She was the founder of La Cambre-Mode(s) at La Cambre and of the "Master Fashion and Accessory Design" course at the Institut Français de la Mode.

== Biography ==
Born on 2 February 1949, Pairon earned a degree in art history at the Musée d’art ancien in Brussels and became an interior designer in 1981 following her training at the College of Advertising and Design. She was self-taught in fashion and created her first clothing collection in 1978, followed by numerous exhibitions in various galleries in the 1980s. She then taught fashion at the École Supérieure des Arts de Mons.

In 1986, Pairon created the "styling and fashion" workshop at La Cambre in collaboration with Joseph Noiret, which she directed until June 1999. There, she notably trained Olivier Theyskens. In 1999, she founded the "Fashion Design Department" and the "Master Fashion and Accessory Design" at the Institut Français de la Mode, where she taught until 2012.

In 2004 and 2005, Pairon participated in teaching programs in Thailand and Vietnam. She was also "External Assessor" British schools such as Central Saint Martins. She was made a Knight of the Ordre des Arts et des Lettres on 24 May 2012 in a ceremony at the Institut Français de la Mode. The award was given to her by Didier Grumbach, then president of the Fédération française de la couture, on behalf of the Minister of Culture. In 2015, she curated an exhibition dedicated to Luc Van Malderen, her mentor at La Cambre. She continued to lead seminars, courses, and creative workshops until 2022.

Franc' Pairon died of cancer in Ixelles on 12 February 2023, at the age of 74.
