= Wolfgang Weber (politician) =

German engineer and politician (1939–2023)

Member of the Landtag of Saxony
- In office 1990–1994

Personal details
- Born: 26 June 1939 Breslau, Gau Silesia, Germany
- Died: 7 February 2023 (aged 83)
- Party: CDU
- Occupation: Engineer

Wolfgang Weber (26 June 1939 – 7 February 2023) was a German engineer and politician. A member of the Christian Democratic Union, he served in the Landtag of Saxony from 1990 to 1994.

Weber died on 7 February 2023, at the age of 83.
