= Sun Manji =

Chinese pharmacologist (1931–2023)

- 孙曼霁
- Born: 3 August 1931; Kaifeng, Henan, China
- Died: 22 February 2023 (aged 91); 301 Hospital, Beijing, China
- Education: Air Force Medical University
- Scientific career
- Fields: Biochemical pharmacology
- Workplaces: Academy of Military Medical Sciences

Chinese name
- Simplified Chinese: 孙曼霁
- Traditional Chinese: 孫曼霽
Transcriptions
Standard Mandarin
- Hanyu Pinyin: Sūn Mànjì

Sun Manji (Chinese: 孙曼霁; 3 August 1931 – 22 February 2023) was a Chinese biochemical pharmacologist who was a researcher at the Academy of Military Medical Sciences, and an academician of the Chinese Academy of Sciences.

He was a delegate to the 8th National People's Congress. He was a member of the 8th and 9th National Committee of the Chinese People's Political Consultative Conference.

== Biography ==
Sun was born in Kaifeng, Henan, on 3 August 1931, while his ancestral home is in Anyang. In 1948, he was accepted to the School of Medicine, National Central University, which was reshuffled as the Air Force Medical University in 1954. After university, he was assigned to the Institute of Toxicology and Drugs, Academy of Military Medical Sciences, where he engaged in long-term research on the biochemical mechanism of chemical warfare agent poisoning and prevention.

Sun was a visiting scholar at the University of London from 1973 to 1975 and a visiting professor of Technische Universität Berlin from 1987 to 1988.

Sun died at the 301 Hospital, in Beijing, on 22 February 2023, at the age of 91.

== Honours and awards ==
- 1986 State Science and Technology Progress Award (Special) for the research on medical protection of special weapon injuries in wartime
- 1987 State Natural Science Award (Second Class) for the research on biochemical mechanism of the interaction between soman and acetylcholinesterase
- November 1991 Member of the Chinese Academy of Sciences (CAS)
