= Pierre Apraxine =

Estonian born American art historian (1934 – 2023)

Pierre Apraxine (December 10, 1934 – February 26, 2023) was an American art historian.

== Biography ==
Born in 1934 in Tallinn, Estonia, into a noble family tracing its roots back to 15th-century Russia, his family relocated to Brussels before World War II. During a return to Estonia in 1941 to safeguard family property, his father was arrested by the Red Army and executed in Leningrad.

Apraxine studied at the Royal Academy of Fine Arts and the Royal Higher Institute for the History of Art and Archaeology. In 1969, he received a Fulbright scholarship and moved to New York, where he worked at the Museum of Modern Art until a union walkout in 1973.

Apraxine developed an interest in 20th-century photography while employed at the Marlborough Gallery, learning under painter and photographer Paul Katz. Apraxine was part of a group of photography enthusiasts known as the "Eye Club," which included curator Françoise Heilbrun, art dealers André Jammes and Gérard Lévy, and collector Sam Wagstaff.

Apraxine co-curated several exhibitions, including The Waking Dream (1993), La Divine Comtesse: Photographs of the Countess de Castiglione (2000), and The Perfect Medium: Photography and the Occult (2005) at the Metropolitan Museum of Art.
