= Ernest L. Daman =

American engineer (1923–2023)

Ernest Ludwig Daman (14 March 1923 – 25 February 2023) was a German-born American mechanical engineer, inventor, and business executive, who was Senior Vice President of Foster Wheeler Corporation. He served as president of the American Society of Mechanical Engineers from 1988 to 1989.

== Biography ==
Born in Hannover, Germany, Daman obtained his BSc in mechanical engineering from the Polytechnic Institute of Brooklyn, now New York University Tandon School of Engineering in 1943. After serving in the army from 1944 to 1946, he started his lifelong career at the Foster Wheeler Corporation.

Daman worked his way up at Foster Wheeler Corporation, where in 1988 he retired as Senior Vice President. In the same year, in 1988, Daman was elected as a member of the National Academy of Engineering for significant and unique contributions to the design and development of power generation equipment, and for professional leadership. In 1995 Daman was state-federal technology executive, the first, in the Office of Science and Technology by the White House.

Daman died on 25 February 2023, at the age of 99.

== Selected publications ==
- Ernest L. Daman, Robert J. Zoschak. Supercharged Boiler: Design, Development and Application. 1956.

Patents, a selection

- Daman, Ernest L., Henry Phillips, John Blizard, and John J. Vail, "Vapor-liquid separator." U.S. Patent No. 3,296,779. 10 Jan. 1967.
- Daman, Ernest L. "Combined-cycle power generation system using a coal-fired gasifier." U.S. Patent No. 5,375,408. 27 Dec. 1994.
- Daman, Ernest L., Francis D. Fitzgerald, and Robert J. Zoschak. "Staged furnaces for firing coal pyrolysis gas and char." U.S. Patent No. 5,327,726. 12 Jul. 1994.
