= Léopold L. Foulem =

Canadian ceramist (1945–2023)

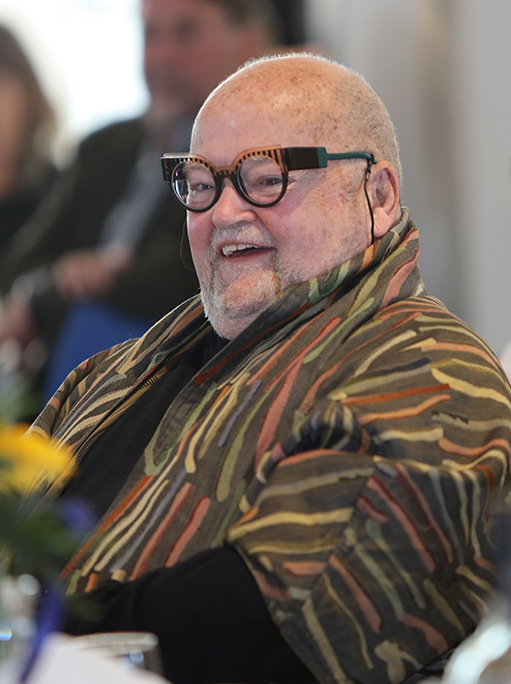
- Léopold L. Foulem
- Born: April 4, 1945; Caraquet, New Brunswick, Canada
- Died: February 18, 2023 (aged 77); Montreal, Canada
- Education: New Brunswick Handicraft School, Fredericton (1964–1965); Institut des arts appliqués, Montréal, transferred to the Alberta College of Art and Design (graduating 1969); Sheridan School of Craft and Design (1970); summer school at the Haystack Mountain School of Crafts in Maine; MFA Indiana State University (1988)
- Known for: Ceramist, writer, teacher
- Spouse: Richard Milette (b. 1960)
- Awards: Order of Canada

Léopold L. Foulem CM (April 4, 1945 – February 18, 2023) was an internationally renowned Canadian ceramist. He lived in Montreal where he was a professor of ceramics, then of visual arts. His work was featured in over 50 solo exhibitions, including solo exhibitions at the Musée national des beaux-arts du Québec in Quebec City and the Gardiner Museum of Ceramic Art in Toronto, and he also lectured widely and wrote on the subject of ceramics. He was an expert on the ceramics of Pablo Picasso and in 2004 co-curated a show of Picasso's ceramics. One of his interests was early Québec studio pottery which he collected and gave generously to Canadian museums.

== Career ==
Foulem was born in Caraquet, New Brunswick. From 1964 until 1970, he studied at different schools including summer school at the Haystack Mountain School of Crafts in Maine. In 1988, he received his MFA from Indiana State University.

For Foulem, "matter doesn't matter," as he said about his work and he sought to transform the limits of the medium sometimes incorporating found objects or using different 3-dimensional objects. Humour was one of his techniques. He made fun of several genres and forms as well as asserting, even provocatively, gay identity through his work. Unusually for a ceramic artist, his work is sometimes considered sculpture.

In 2023, Renée Blanchar made a documentary about Foulem titled Lettre d'amour à Léopold L. Foulem [Love letter to Léopold L. Foulem].

Foulem taught ceramics in Montreal at the Collège d’enseignement général et professionnel.

Foulem considered himself a ceramics theoretician. He believed that art is about ideas and about abstraction. He considered it to be very important that the objects he made were not useful. His own work was about function but not functional. Foulem had almost sixty solo exhibitions and participated in more than 200 group exhibitions on four continents during his 50 year career as an artist.

Foulem lectured extensively on ceramics. In 2004 he co-curated the exhibition Picasso and Ceramics, co-organized by the Musée national des beaux-arts du Québec.

== Selected public collections ==
- Art Gallery of Nova Scotia, Halifax
- Beaverbrook Art Gallery, Fredericton
- Canadian Museum of History, Gatineau
- Gardiner Museum of Ceramic Art, Toronto
- Los Angeles County Museum of Art
- Montreal Museum of Fine Arts
- Musée national des beaux-arts du Québec
- Victoria and Albert Museum

== Awards ==
- Jean A. Chalmers National Crafts Award (1999)
- Saidye Bronfman Award for excellence in the fine crafts (2001)
- Prix Éloizes as Artist of the Year in the Visual Arts (2003)
- Order of Canada (2019)
