= Paul Sullivan (footballer) =

Australian rules footballer

Personal information
- Full name: Paul Sullivan
- Born: 1 October 1937
- Died: 10 February 2023 (aged 85)
- Original team: Deloraine / Xavier College
- Height: 187 cm (6 ft 2 in)
- Weight: 86 kg (190 lb)

Playing career^{1}
Years	Club	Games (Goals)
1959	Hawthorn	1 (0)
- ^{1} Playing statistics correct to the end of 1959.

Paul Sullivan (1 October 1937 – 10 February 2023) was a former Australian rules footballer who played with Hawthorn in the Victorian Football League (VFL).
