= Allan Hotchkin =

Australian rules footballer (1943–2023)

Personal information
- Full name: Allan Douglas Hotchkin
- Born: 7 February 1943
- Died: 25 February 2022 (aged 79)
- Height: 180 cm (5 ft 11 in)
- Weight: 87 kg (192 lb)

Playing career^{1}
Years	Club	Games (Goals)
1961–1963	South Melbourne	14 (0)
- ^{1} Playing statistics correct to the end of 1963.

Allan Douglas Hotchkin (7 February 1943 – 25 February 2023) was an Australian rules footballer who played for the South Melbourne Football Club in the Victorian Football League (VFL).
