= Bernie Laffey =

Australian rules footballer

Personal information
- Full name: Bernard Laffey
- Born: 3 March 1928
- Died: 15 February 2023 (aged 94)
- Original team: West Footscray
- Height: 175 cm (5 ft 9 in)
- Weight: 72 kg (159 lb)

Playing career^{1}
Years	Club	Games (Goals)
1949	Footscray	4 (0)
- ^{1} Playing statistics correct to the end of 1949.

Bernard Laffey (3 March 1928 - 15 February 2023) was an Australian rules footballer who played for the Footscray Football Club in the Victorian Football League (VFL).
