= Helena Parente Cunha =

Brazilian educator and writer (1929–2023)

Helena Parente Cunha (1929— 11 February 2023) was a Brazilian educator and writer.

She was born in Salvador, Bahia and received a PhD in Italian literature and literary theory in 1976. Cunha taught literary theory at the Federal University of Rio de Janeiro; at one time, she was the university's Dean of Humanities.

Her 1960 poetry collection Corpo do gozo won the poetry competition of the Secretariat of Education and Culture of Guanabara.

She died on 11 February 2023.

== Selected works ==
- Corpo no cerco (Surrounded body), poetry (1978)
- Maramar (Sea love), poetry (1980)
- Os Provisorios (The tentative), short stories (1980)
- Mulher no espelho (Woman between mirrors), novel (1983), received the Prêmio Cruz e Sousa de Literatura
- As doze cores do vermelho (The twelve colours of red), novel (1988)
- Mulheres Inventadas (Invented Women) (1994)
- A casa e as casas (The house and the houses) (1996)
