= Alois Mayer =

Austrian politician (1949–2023)

Member of the Municipal Council and Landtag of Vienna
- In office 3 March 1997 – 24 November 2015
- Constituency: Wahlkreis Hietzing

Personal details
- Born: 14 June 1949 Vienna, Allied-occupied Austria
- Died: 4 February 2023 (aged 73)
- Party: SPÖ

Alois Mayer (14 June 1949 – 4 February 2023) was an Austrian politician. A member of the Social Democratic Party, he served in the Municipal Council and Landtag of Vienna from 1997 to 2015.

Mayer died on 4 February 2023, at the age of 73.
