= Nadia Hashem =

Jordanian journalist and politician (died 2023)

Minister of State for Women's Affairs
- In office 2 May 2012 – 11 October 2012
- Monarch: King Abdullah II
- Prime Minister: Fayez Tarawneh
- Preceded by: Office established
- Succeeded by: Office abolished

Personal details
- Died: 12 February 2023
- Spouse: Abdel Afu Al Aloul
- Children: 4
- Education: Middlesex University

Nadia Hashem (Arabic: نادية هاشم; died 12 February 2023) was a Jordanian journalist and politician who served as minister of state for women's affairs from May 2012 to October 2012. She was the first female state minister in Jordan.

== Education ==
Hashem held a bachelor's degree in mathematics, which she received from Middlesex University.

== Career ==
Hashem worked as a journalist for Al Ra'i. She was the president of the National Society for Enhancement of Freedom and Democracy, a society supporting democratic participation.

Hashem was appointed minister of state for women's affairs to the second cabinet of Fayez Tarawneh, which was formed on 2 May 2012. The office held by Hashem was established with her appointment. Hashem was not appointed to the next cabinet formed by Abdullah Ensour on 11 October 2012. The office was abolished, too. Then she became the head of Women Empowerment Team at Economic Development Forum.

=== Work ===
Hashem was a poet and published an Arabic novel entitled A different kind of veil in 2010.

== Personal life and death ==
Hashem was married to engineer Abdel Afu Al Aloul and had four children. She died on 12 February 2023 and was buried the same day at the Sahab cemetery.
