= Jean Pattou =

French architect and artist (1940–2023)

- Born: Jean-Marie Robert Paul Pattou; 14 February 1940; Jeumont, France
- Died: 13 February 2023 (aged 82)
- Occupations: Architect, artist

Jean-Marie Robert Paul Pattou (14 February 1940 – 13 February 2023) was a French architect and artist.

Pattou was born in Jeumount. He graduated from the École d'architecture de Paris and moved to Lille in 1968, where he gave his first exhibition in 1981. He designed the fresco at the Gare Lille-Europe on the Lille Metro, as well as many others.

Pettou died on 13 February 2023, at the age of 82.
