= Herbie McCracken =

Rugby union player from Northern Ireland

- Full name: Herbert Lowry McCracken
- Born: 8 July 1927 Belfast, Northern Ireland
- Died: 15 February 2023 (aged 95)
- School: Banbridge Academy
- University: Queen's University Belfast
- Occupation: Solicitor

Rugby union career
- Position: Scrum-half
International career
| Years | Team | Apps | (Points) |
| 1954 | Ireland | 1 | (0) |

Herbert Lowry McCracken (8 July 1927 – 15 February 2023) was an Irish international rugby union player.

== Biography ==
McCracken was born in Belfast and educated at Banbridge Academy, where he learned his rugby.

A scrum-half, McCracken played his rugby for the North of Ireland and Queen's University clubs. He was named to debut for Ireland in their 1951 Five Nations opener against France, but had to withdraw from the team after being hospitalised with pleurisy. His only Ireland cap didn't come until 1954, deputising Johnny O'Meara for a match against Wales at Lansdowne Road. Ireland lost to a last-minute Denzil Thomas drop goal.

McCracken was also an Ulster representative hockey player and won an Irish Senior Cup with the Banbridge Hockey Club.

== See also ==
- List of Ireland national rugby union players
