= Quirin Vrehen =

Dutch physicist (1932–2023)

Quirinus Henricus Franciscus "Quirin" Vrehen (25 February 1932 – 5 February 2023) was a Dutch physicist. He served as head physicist of the Philips Natuurkundig Laboratorium.

== Life ==
Vrehen was born on 25 February 1932 in 's-Hertogenbosch. He obtained a PhD in physics from Utrecht University in 1963 under professor Volger with a thesis on electron spin resonance and optical studies of solids. From 1963 to 1966 he worked in the United States at the MIT National Magnetic Laboratory. At the institute he worked on magneto-optical experiments on semiconductors. Vrehen then returned to the Netherlands and started working at the Philips Natuurkundig Laboratorium. At the laboratorium he served as leader of the spectroscopy group. From 1980 to 1985 he focused on laser spectroscopy. He later became head physicist at the laboratorium.

Vrehen was elected member of the Royal Netherlands Academy of Arts and Sciences in 1988. He died on 5 February 2023 in Eindhoven.
