= Óscar López Balestra =

Uruguayan politician (1934–2023)

Member of the Chamber of Representatives of Uruguay for Tacuarembó
- In office 1985–1990
- In office 1972–1973

Personal details
- Born: 14 October 1934; Tacuarembó, Uruguay
- Died: 27 February 2023 (aged 88)
- Political party: PN

Óscar López Balestra (14 October 1934 – 27 February 2023) was a Uruguayan politician. A member of the National Party, he served in the Chamber of Representatives from 1972 to 1973 and again from 1985 to 1990.

López died on 27 February 2023, at the age of 88.
