= Fleur de Villiers =

South African journalist (1937–2023)

- Born: December 1, 1937; Port Elizabeth
- Died: February 7, 2023
- Other name: Olive Lourens
- Citizenship: South Africa
- Occupations: Journalist, business consultant

Fleur Olive Lourens de Villiers, CMG, (1 December 1937 – 7 February 2023) was a South African journalist and business consultant who served as the chairman of the trustees of the International Institute for Strategic Studies.

== Biography ==
De Villiers was born in Port Elizabeth (now Gqeberha), South Africa on 1 December 1937.

In 2011 she was invested as a Companion of the Order of St Michael and St George for services to democratic transition, reconciliation and governance in South Africa. She was a Global Ambassador for the School of Oriental and African Studies (SOAS), University of London.

== Death ==
De Villiers died of a stroke on 7 February 2023, at the age of 85.
