= Louis Roquet =

Canadian administrator (died 2023)

Louis Léon Roquet (30 July 1942 – 24 February 2023) was a Canadian academic, civil servant, and former Chancellor of the University of Montreal. He was the first CEO of Investissement Québec. He was a director of Birks Group.

== Early life ==
Roquet did his bachelor's degree in art from the Université de Montréal. He completed his MBA from the HEC Montréal. He did a PhD from Harvard University in business administration.

== Career ==
Roquet joined the HEC Montréal as a professor and left the university to work as a business consultant in 1977. From 1986 to 1990, he was the vice-president at Steinberg. From 1990 to 1994, he was the general manager at Communauté urbaine de Montréal. He worked at Ville de Montréal from 1994 to 1995 as secretary general.

From 1995 to 2002, Roquet was the founding CEO and president of Investissement Québec. He was a director of Société de développement Angus from 1995 to 2009. From 2002 to 2004, he was the CEO of Société des alcools du Québec. From 2004 to 2009, he was the CEO of Desjardins Venture Capital.

Roquet was the general manager of Montréal from 2010 to 2012. He resigned following tensions with Michael Applebaum. He was made the CEO of Cevital for a two-year term. He is the former CEO of Desjardins Venture Capital.

Roquet was appointed a director of EXP, an engineering company, in 2016. He was appointed a director of Université de Montréal.

Riquet was appointed Vice Chairman of the board of trustees at the Université de Montréal in 2017 and made chairman of the board of trustees on 1 June 2018. He was also made the Chancellor of the Université de Montréal.

== Death ==
Roquet died on 24 February 2023.
