= Jassim Ismail Juma =

Kuwaiti diplomat and politician (1938–2023)

Member of the National Assembly of Kuwait
- In office 1971–1975
- Constituency: Kaifan

Personal details
- Born: 1 January 1938 Kuwait City, Kuwait
- Died: 11 February 2023 (aged 85) Kuwait City, Kuwait
- Party: Independent
- Occupation: Diplomat

Jassim Ismail Juma (Arabic: جاسم إسماعيل جمعة; 1 January 1938 – 11 February 2023) was a Kuwaiti diplomat and politician. An independent, he served in the National Assembly from 1971 to 1975.

Juma died in Kuwait City on 11 February 2023, at the age of 85.
