= Wolfgang Dudda =

German politician (1957–2023)

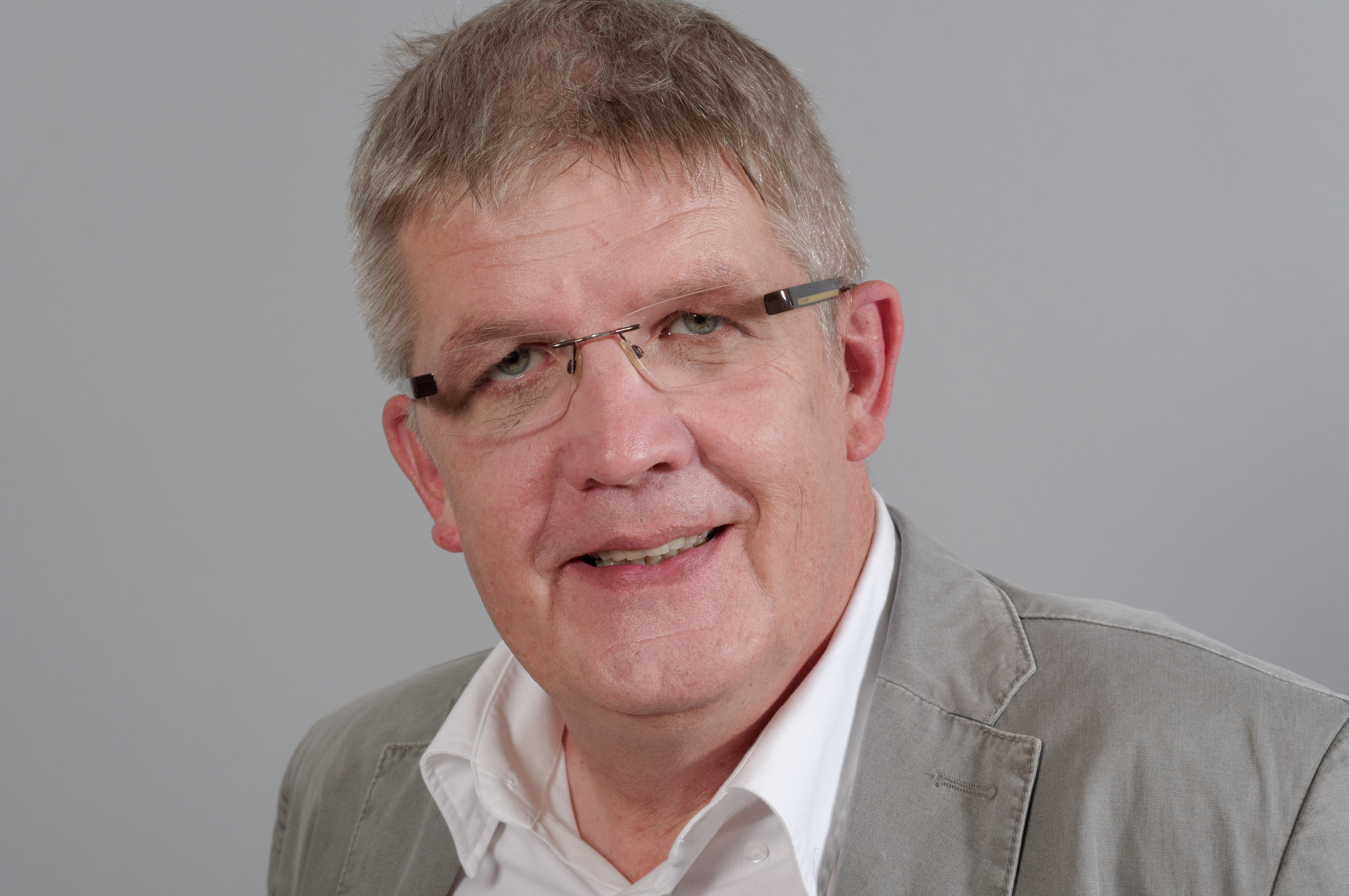
- Dudda in 2013

Member of the Landtag of Schleswig-Holstein
- In office 5 June 2012 – 6 June 2017

Personal details
- Born: 16 July 1957 Bad Segeberg, Schleswig-Holstein, West Germany
- Died: 27 February 2023 (aged 65)
- Party: Piraten

Wolfgang Dudda (16 July 1957 – 27 February 2023) was a German politician. A member of the Pirate Party, he served in the Landtag of Schleswig-Holstein from 2012 to 2017.

Dudda died on 27 February 2023, at the age of 65.
