= Bernard Bellec =

French politician (1934–2023)

Mayor of Niort
- In office 8 January 1986 – 6 December 2002
- Preceded by: René Gaillard
- Succeeded by: Alain Baudin

President of the Communauté d'agglomération de Niort
- In office April 2001 – October 2002
- Preceded by: position established
- Succeeded by: Alain Mathieu

Personal details
- Born: 8 May 1934 Hayange, France
- Died: 23 February 2023 (aged 88) Niort, France
- Party: PS

Bernard Bellec (8 May 1934 – 23 February 2023) was a French politician of the Socialist Party (PS).

== Biography ==
Born in Hayange on 8 May 1934, Bellec began his professional career with the Mutuelle d'assurance des instituteurs de France. He was president of Smacl assurances from 1996 to 2009.

A member of the PS, Bellec became Deputy Mayor of Niort in 1971 before becoming Mayor in 1986 after the sudden death of his predecessor, René Gaillard. He was re-elected in 1995 despite a dispute with party leader Ségolène Royal. He was re-elected again in 2001 but resigned on 6 December 2002 following pressure from party activist Étienne Bonnin. From April 2001 to October 2002, he was President of the Communauté d'agglomération de Niort.

In 1993, Bellec was the PS nominee for the National Assembly in Deux-Sèvres's 1st constituency, but lost in the second round to Jacques Brossard.

Bernard Bellec died in Niort on 23 February 2023, at the age of 88.

== Distinctions ==
- Commander of the Legion of Honour (1998)
