= Dieter Haaßengier =

German politician (1934–2023)

Member of the Landtag of Lower Saxony
- In office 21 June 1970 – 25 February 1976

Personal details
- Born: 30 May 1934 Dimmen, Gau Pomerania, Germany
- Died: 7 February 2023 (aged 88) Garbsen, Lower Saxony, Germany
- Party: CDU

Dieter Haaßengier (30 May 1934 – 7 February 2023) was a German politician. A member of the Christian Democratic Union, he served in the Landtag of Lower Saxony from 1970 to 1976.

Haaßengier died in Garbsen on 7 February 2023, at the age of 88.
