= Eileen Fitt =

UK journalist and editor (1951–2023)

Eileen Fitt (1951-2023) was a British news editor and BBC journalist. She was an editor of the BBC’s evening news programmes. In 1995, she won a Royal Television Society award for her news programme on the assassination of Yitzhak Rabin.
