= Ministry of Culture and Sports (Uzbekistan) =

Government ministry of Uzbekistan

Ministry of Culture and Sports of the Republic of Uzbekistan
- O'zbekiston Respublikasi madaniyat va sport ishlari vazirligi

Agency overview
- Jurisdiction: Government of Uzbekistan
- Minister responsible: Minister of Culture and Sports
- Website: madaniyat.uz

The Ministry of Culture and Sports of the Republic of Uzbekistan (Uzbek: O‘zbekiston Respublikasi madaniyat va sport ishlari vazirligi; Uzbek Cyrillic: Ўзбекистон Республикаси маданият ва спорт ишлари вазирлиги) is a body of the Government of Uzbekistan that responsible for state policy in cultural spheres, Art, Cinematography, archives, inter-nations issues, and sports.
