= Deaths in July 2023 =

The following is a list of notable deaths in July 2023.

Entries for each day are listed alphabetically by surname. A typical entry lists information in the following sequence:

- Name, age, country of citizenship at birth, subsequent country of citizenship (if applicable), reason for notability, cause of death (if known), and reference.

== July 2023 ==
=== 1 ===
- Qadri Abu Bakr, 70, Palestinian politician, minister of detainees affairs (since 2018) and MP (since 2018), traffic collision.
- Ahn Junghyo, 81, South Korean novelist and translator, cancer.
- Victoria Amelina, 37, Ukrainian writer, injuries sustained in a missile strike.
- Birger Asplund, 93, Swedish Olympic hammer thrower (1956, 1960, 1964).
- Josef Bille, 78, German physicist.
- Ints Cālītis, 92, Latvian politician, MP (1990–1993).
- Gerard Cott, 83, Irish politician, TD (1969–1973).
- Christian Dalger, 73, French footballer (Toulon, Monaco, national team).
- Vincenzo D'Amico, 68, Italian footballer (Lazio, Torino, Ternana), cancer.
- Frank Field, 100, American meteorologist (WNBC, WCBS, WWOR).
- Andrei Fomin, 57, Russian lawyer and state prosecutor, acting prosecutor of the Republic of Crimea (2016–2017), prosecutor of Chuvashia (since 2020), drowned.
- Roberto Gramajo, 75, Argentine footballer (Rosario Central, Panathinaikos, Huracán, national team).
- Meg Johnson, 86, English actress (Coronation Street, Brookside, Emmerdale).
- Bob Kerslake, Baron Kerslake, 68, British civil servant, head of the home civil service (2012–2014) and member of the House of Lords (since 2015), cancer.
- Ippei Kuri, 83, Japanese manga artist (Judo Boy) and animator (Speed Racer), co-founder of Tatsunoko Production.
- Robert Lieberman, 75, American film director (D3: The Mighty Ducks, Fire in the Sky, All I Want for Christmas), cancer.
- Valery Manilov, 84, Russian military officer and politician, senator (2001–2004).
- Paul David Manson, 88, Canadian general, chief of the Defence Staff (1986–1989).
- Siegfried Melzig, 82, German football player (SV Meppen) and manager (VfL Osnabrück, SpVgg Bayreuth).
- Francisco Molina Ruiz, 72, Mexican lawyer and politician, senator (1997–2000).
- John O'Grady, 83, Irish hurling referee.
- Sampat Prakash, 86, Indian trade unionist, cardiac arrest.
- Habib Sadek, 92, Lebanese writer and politician, MP (1992–1996).
- Christopher H. Sterling, 80, American media historian.
- Klaus Täuber, 65, German football player (Schalke 04, Bayer Leverkusen) and manager (Schwarz-Weiß Essen).
- Sir David Tompkins, 93, New Zealand lawyer and judge, King's Counsel (since 1974), High Court judge (1983–1997), chancellor of the University of Waikato (1981–1985).
- Lawrence Turman, 96, American film producer (The Graduate, The Thing, The River Wild).
- Dilano van 't Hoff, 18, Dutch racing driver, race collision.
- Serge Vieira, 46, French chef.

=== 2 ===
- Syaukat Banjaransari, 86, Indonesian general and presidential advisor.
- Winfred Blevins, 84, American author.
- Anna Maria Bietti Sestieri, 80, Italian archaeologist.
- Valeriano Bozal, 82, Spanish historian and philosopher.
- Michel Charpentier, 95, French sculptor and medalist.
- Cho Yong-ik, 89, South Korean painter.
- Choi Bong-hong, 80, South Korean politician, MNA (2012–2016).
- Wayne Evans, 51, Welsh footballer (Rochdale, Walsall, Kidderminster Harriers), heart attack.
- Joan Freeman, 88, British psychologist.
- Joseph John Gerry, 94, American Roman Catholic prelate, bishop of Portland (1989–2004) and auxiliary bishop of Manchester (1986–1989).
- Fodil Goumrassa, 71, Algerian judoka.
- Mario Guerrero, 73, Dominican baseball player (Boston Red Sox, California Angels, Oakland Athletics).
- Khosrow Hassanzadeh, 59, Iranian painter.
- K. Jayaram, 74, Indian photographer.
- Ling Yongshun, 86, Chinese academic, member of the Chinese Academy of Engineering.
- Susan Love, 75, American surgeon, leukemia.
- Đorđe Mihailović, 95, Greek-Serbian cemetery keeper (Zeitenlik).
- Milan Milutinović, 80, Serbian politician, president (1997–2002) and minister of foreign affairs of Yugoslavia (1995–1998).
- Doug Naysmith, 82, British politician, MP (1997–2010).
- Margaret Nisbett, 94, Australian soprano.
- Theo Pahlplatz, 76, Dutch footballer (Twente, national team).
- Sepúlveda Pertence, 85, Brazilian jurist, prosecutor general (1985–1989) and justice of the Supreme Federal Court (1989–2007).
- Minnie Bruce Pratt, 76, American writer and activist.
- Eleanor Scoones, 42, English television producer and director, ovarian cancer.
- James A. Sharp Jr., 90, American politician, mayor of Flint, Michigan (1983–1987).
- Randolf Stich, 57, German lawyer and politician, cancer.
- Arturo Woodman, 91, Peruvian sports administrator and politician.
- Rudolf Zehetgruber, 96, Austrian film director (The Congress Dances, The Maddest Car in the World), screenwriter (The Black Cobra) and actor.

=== 3 ===
- Vicki Anderson, 83, American soul singer.
- Michael Baden-Powell, 4th Baron Baden-Powell, 82, Australian scouting leader.
- William Blundell, 76, Australian painter and art copyist.
- Catherine Burks-Brooks, 83, American civil rights activist.
- Nicole Demers, 73, Canadian politician, MP (2004–2011).
- James Dobbins, 81, American diplomat, ambassador to the European Union (1991–1993) and Afghanistan (2001–2002), complications from Parkinson's disease.
- Antwun Echols, 52, American middleweight boxer.
- Elsu, 23, New Zealand Standardbred racehorse.
- Cecil Exum, 60, American basketball player (North Melbourne Giants, Melbourne Tigers, Geelong Supercats).
- Mo Foster, 78, English multi-instrumentalist (Affinity, Fancy, RMS) and record producer, cancer.
- Léon Gautier, 100, French soldier, D-Day veteran.
- Lincoln Mayorga, 86, American pianist and arranger.
- Greig Oliver, 58, Scottish rugby union player (national team) and coach (Munster), paragliding accident.
- Carlos Raffo Dasso, 95, Peruvian diplomat and politician, ambassador to the United Kingdom (1986–1989) and minister of industry (1989–1990).
- Don Reinhoudt, 78, American weightlifter, World's Strongest Man (1979), traffic collision.
- Sudakshina Sarma, 88, Indian singer and musician.
- Vince Tobin, 79, American football coach (Arizona Cardinals).
- Abuhuraira Udasan, 81, Filipino Muslim theologian.
- Francis Wodié, 87, Ivorian politician, MP (1990–1995) and president of the Constitutional Council (2011–2015).
- Yan Mingfu, 91, Chinese politician, vice chairperson of the CPPCC (1988–1993).
- Yashpaul, 86, Indian classical singer.

=== 4 ===
- George Aghajanian, 91, American psychiatrist.
- Amer Alwan, 66, Iraqi-French film director and actor (The Girl on the Train), cancer.
- Aleksey Avramenko, 46, Belarusian politician, minister of transport and communications (since 2019).
- Georges Bereta, 77, French footballer (Saint-Étienne, Marseille, national team).
- John Berylson, 70, American businessman and football club chairman (Millwall), traffic collision.
- Denise Bombardier, 82, Canadian journalist (Radio-Canada).
- Ulrich Braun, 81, German footballer (Schwarz-Weiß Essen, Arminia Bielefeld, FC Gütersloh).
- Siqueira Campos, 94, Brazilian politician, four-time governor of Tocantins, senator (2019), infection.
- Chico Ferramenta, 64, Brazilian trade unionist and politician, deputy (1995–1996).
- Adolfo Gilly, 94, Mexican historian.
- Tabaré Gómez Laborde, 74, Uruguayan cartoonist, pancreatic cancer.
- Jenő Jandó, 71, Hungarian pianist.
- Kristaps Keggi, 88, Latvian-American orthopedic surgeon.
- Miki Liukkonen, 33, Finnish writer, poet and musician, suicide.
- Canelita Medina, 84, Venezuelan salsa singer.
- Betty Nuovo, 91, American politician.
- Cheri Pies, 73, American academic, cancer.
- Abdul Ghapur Salleh, 80, Malaysian politician, MP (2004–2018), kidney failure.
- Liaqat Shabab, Pakistani politician, cardiac arrest.
- Jan Sierhuis, 94, Dutch painter.
- Robin Tamang, 60, Nepalese singer and actor (The Last Hour).
- Greg Tegart, 94, Australian public servant.
- Fred Willis, 75, American football player (Cincinnati Bengals, Houston Oilers).
- Beat Züger, 62, Swiss chess player.

=== 5 ===
- Rob Agerbeek, 85, Indonesian-born Dutch pianist.
- Marvin S. Arrington Sr., 82, American politician and jurist, president of the Atlanta City Council (1980–1997) and Fulton County superior court judge (2002–2012).
- Keith Ball, 82, English footballer (Port Vale, Walsall).
- Franca Capetta, 86, Italian Olympic archer (1976, 1980).
- John W. Dickenson, 89, Australian inventor.
- Francis R. Dillon, 83, American Air Force general, commander of the OSI (1988–1993).
- Mario Dumaual, 64, Filipino entertainment journalist (ABS-CBN), septic shock.
- Awa Ehoura, Ivorian journalist and radio host.
- Anthony Gilbert, 88, British composer and academic.
- Ezekiel Guti, 100, Zimbabwean evangelist.
- Lydie Koch-Miramond, 92, French astrophysicist, pioneer in the study of cosmic rays
- Aleksey Kuznetsov, 82, Russian actor (The Green Flame, D'Artagnan and Three Musketeers, Dark Eyes).
- Jacob Larsen, 44, Danish cricketer (national team).
- Coco Lee, 48, Hong Kong-American singer-songwriter (Singer), suicide.
- Ralph Lundsten, 86, Swedish composer.
- Roly Meates, 85, Irish rugby union coach.
- Craig Menkins, 52, Australian rugby league player (Western Suburbs, North Queensland).
- Andrés Oliva, 74, Spanish racing cyclist.
- Jack Rains, 85, American attorney and politician, secretary of state of Texas (1987–1989).
- Shen Binyi, 78, Chinese vice admiral, deputy commander of PLAN (1999–2004) and deputy head of GLD (1994–1999).
- Martin Stevens, 69, Canadian disco singer ("Love Is in the Air").
- Walkiria Terradura, 99, Italian partisan.
- George Tickner, 76, American rock guitarist (Journey, Frumious Bandersnatch).
- Margaret Kemarre Turner, 84, Australian Arrente interpreter, artist, and author.

=== 6 ===
- Attila Abonyi, 76, Hungarian-born Australian football player (Melbourne Hungaria SC, Australia national team) and manager (Sydney Croatia).
- Jeffrey Carlson, 48, American actor (All My Children, The Goat, or Who Is Sylvia?, Hitch), idiopathic dilated cardiomyopathy.
- Zé Celso, 86, Brazilian playwright, stage director and actor (Teatro Oficina), injuries sustained in a fire.
- Graham Clark, 81, English opera tenor, cancer.
- Johnie Cooks, 64, American football player (Baltimore / Indianapolis Colts, New York Giants, Cleveland Browns).
- Brendan Daly, 83, Irish politician, TD (1973–1992, 1997–2002) and three-time senator, minister for fisheries and forestry (1982).
- Arnaldo Forlani, 97, Italian politician, prime minister (1980–1981), minister of foreign affairs (1976–1979) and defence (1974–1976).
- Gene Gaines, 85, American football player (Ottawa Rough Riders, Montreal Alouettes) and coach (Winnipeg Blue Bombers).
- James Hayes, 92, British colonial administrator and historian.
- George W. Jackson, 98, American politician, member of the Pennsylvania House of Representatives (1981–1990).
- Lâm Thị Mỹ Dạ, 73, Vietnamese poet.
- Lê Phước Thọ, 95, Vietnamese politician, member of the 7th Politburo (1991–1996).
- Peter Nero, 89, American pianist and conductor (Philly Pops), Grammy winner (1962, 1963).
- Essop Pahad, 84, South African politician, minister in the presidency (1999–2008), cancer.
- Victor Pikayzen, 90, Russian violinist and teacher.
- Beverley Salmon, 92, Canadian activist and municipal politician.
- Joop Sanders, 101, Dutch-American painter and educator.
- Eva Schreiber, 65, German politician, MP (2017–2021).
- Mutulu Shakur, 72, American convicted robber and murderer (1981 Brink's robbery), bone marrow cancer.
- Dick Sheridan, 81, American football coach (Furman Paladins, NC State Wolfpack).
- Stephen M. Silverman, 71, American journalist (New York Post, Time Inc.).
- Caleb Southern, 53, American musician, record producer (Icky Mettle, Whatever and Ever Amen) and computer scientist (Georgia Tech).
- Colin Spencer, 89, English writer (The Guardian) and artist.
- Marlena Spieler, 74, American food writer (Bon Appétit, Saveur, San Francisco Chronicle).
- Alamgir Tareen, 63, Pakistani businessman and cricket club owner (Multan Sultans), suicide by gunshot.
- Jimmy Weldon, 99, American voice actor (The Yogi Bear Show, Challenge of the Superfriends, Shirt Tales), ventriloquist and television host.

=== 7 ===
- Michael Ashburner, 81, English biologist.
- Oscar Brashear, 78, American jazz trumpeter.
- Simon Brown, Baron Brown of Eaton-under-Heywood, 86, British judge and life peer, justice of the Supreme Court (2009–2012) and member of the House of Lords (2004–2023).
- Joseph Chebet, 52, Kenyan long-distance runner.
- Amando Doronila, 95, Filipino journalist, complications from pneumonia.
- Neusa Maria Faro, 78, Brazilian actress (Torre de Babel, Alma Gêmea, A Vida da Gente), thrombosis.
- Violeta Hemsy de Gainza, 94, Argentine pianist and piano pedagogue.
- Tara Heiss, 66, American Hall of Fame basketball player (Maryland Terrapins).
- Mary Ann Hoberman, 92, American author (You Read to Me, I'll Read to You) and poet.
- Ahmed Ilias, 88, Bangladeshi poet.
- Joe Irukwu, 88, Nigerian insurance executive, lawyer and lecturer.
- Anne Klinck, 80, Canadian academic, esophageal cancer.
- Ivan Levačić, 91, Croatian Olympic cyclist (1960).
- Yvonne Littlewood, 95, British television producer and director.
- Nikki McCray-Penson, 51, American Hall of Fame basketball player (Washington Mystics, Indiana Fever) and coach (Old Dominion Lady Monarchs), Olympic champion (1996, 2000).
- Milagros Mata Gil, 72, Venezuelan novelist and essayist.
- Namboothiri, 97, Indian painter and sculptor.
- Kara Puketapu, 89, New Zealand rugby union player (New Zealand Māori), public servant and Māori leader, secretary of Maori Affairs (1977–1983).
- Tan Yock Lin, 70, Singaporean law professor, traffic collision.

=== 8 ===
- Gary Allen, 63, American football player (Houston Oilers, Dallas Cowboys, Calgary Stampeders), heart failure.
- Elkin Fernando Álvarez Botero, 54, Colombian Roman Catholic prelate, auxiliary bishop of Medellín (2012–2020) and bishop of Santa Rosa de Osos (since 2020).
- Patrice Aouissi, 57, French Olympic boxer (1992).
- Earle Bailey, 81, Australian politician, Queensland MP (1983–1986).
- Tarun Chatterjee, 78, Indian jurist, judge of the Calcutta High Court (1990–2003) and the Supreme Court (2004–2010), chief justice of the Allahabad High Court (2003–2004).
- Bryan Collins, 58, American football coach (LIU Sharks).
- Srđan Koljević, 56, Serbian screenwriter and film director (The Red Colored Grey Truck, The Woman with a Broken Nose, The Man Who Defended Gavrilo Princip).
- Judith Liebman, 86, American operations researcher and engineer.
- Gloria Mange, 92, Mexican actress (¿Qué te ha dado esa mujer?, If I Were a Congressman, The Unknown Mariachi).
- José Mattoso, 90, Portuguese medievalist and academic.
- John McCashney, 91, Australian footballer (Hawthorn).
- K. Ravindranathan Nair, 90, Indian film producer (Kanchana Sita, Kummatty, Elippathayam).
- Millison Narh, 68, Ghanaian banker, deputy governor of the Bank of Ghana (2009–2017).
- Gordon Reid, 89, Canadian businessman, founder of Giant Tiger.
- Renault Robinson, 80, American police officer.
- Bill Shipp, 89, American author and journalist (The Atlanta Constitution).
- Adrian Tan, 57, Singaporean novelist (The Teenage Textbook, The Teenage Workbook) and lawyer, president of the Law Society (since 2022), cancer.
- Özkan Uğur, 69, Turkish musician (MFÖ) and actor (A.R.O.G, Arif V 216), lymphoma.
- Bilge Umar, 87, Turkish writer.
- Kevin White, 90, Australian rules footballer (Footscray).
- Evelyn M. Witkin, 102, American geneticist, complications from a fall.
- Melvin Wulf, 95, American lawyer.
- Juris Zarins, 78, German-born American archaeologist.
- Arnulf Zitelmann, 94, German writer.

=== 9 ===
- Dur Muhammad Baloch, 40, Pakistani boxer, heart attack.
- Alain Besançon, 91, French historian.
- Joe Campbell, 68, American football player (New Orleans Saints, Oakland Raiders, Tampa Bay Buccaneers).
- Manny Coto, 62, American television writer and producer (Star Trek: Enterprise, 24, American Horror Story), pancreatic cancer.
- Charlie Daniels, 83, American politician, Arkansas commissioner of state lands (1985–2003), secretary of state (2003–2011), and state auditor (2011–2015).
- Rajani Duganna, 78, Indian politician, mayor of Mangalore City Corporation (2010–2011).
- Michel Dupuy, 93, Canadian politician, minister of multiculturalism and citizenship (1993–1996) and communications (1993–1996), ambassador to the UN (1980–1981).
- Andrea Evans, 66, American actress (Passions, The Bold and the Beautiful, One Life to Live), breast cancer.
- Kenton Forsythe, 78, American audio engineer and inventor.
- Roger Gnoan M'Bala, 80, Ivorian film director (Ablakon, Bouka, Adanggaman).
- Alfred Thomas Grove, 99, British geographer and climatologist.
- Lee Hedges, 93, American high school football coach (Captain Shreve High School).
- Roy Herron, 69, American politician, member of the Tennessee House of Representatives (1987–1997) and Senate (1997–2013), jetski accident.
- Alice Ho, 72, Singaporean actress (Hainan Kopi Tales, Beautiful Connection, The Sky is Still Blue).
- Henry Kamm, 98, German-born American journalist (The New York Times), Pulitzer Prize winner (1978).
- Paul Kestel, 91, German politician, member of the Landtag of Bavaria (1986–1990).
- Mary Kilbourne Matossian, 93, American historian.
- Porfirio Muñoz Ledo, 89, Mexican politician, secretary of labor (1972–1975) and public education (1976–1977), twice president of the chamber of deputies.
- Tommy Møller Nielsen, 61, Danish football player (OB) and manager (B1909, VFF).
- Heinz Ostheimer, 91, German Olympic gymnast (1952).
- Garrick Palmer, 89, English painter, wood engraver and photographer.
- Benno C. Schmidt Jr., 81, American law scholar, president of Yale University (1986–1992).
- Asbjørn Sennels, 44, Danish footballer (Viborg, Brøndby, national team), cancer.
- Leroy W. Stutz, 84, American Air Force officer, pilot, and prisoner of war.
- Luis Suárez, 88, Spanish football player (Barcelona, Inter Milan, national team) and manager.
- Mel Wakabayashi, 80, Canadian-Japanese ice hockey player (Michigan Wolverines, Memphis Wings, Johnstown Jets) and coach.

=== 10 ===
- Tom Adam, Central African warlord, shot.
- Basil Balme, 100, Australian palynologist.
- Enzo Bartocci, 94, Italian sociologist and politician, deputy (1976–1979).
- Derek Beales, 92, British historian.
- Jean-Jacques Becker, 95, French historian.
- Ümit Birol, 60, Turkish football player (Adanaspor, national team) and manager (Alibeyköy), heart attack.
- Erich Bitter, 89, German automobile designer, road racing cyclist, and automobile racer.
- Ben Briscoe, 89, Irish politician, TD (1965–2002) and lord mayor of Dublin (1988–1989).
- Randy Fullmer, 73, American animator (Who Framed Roger Rabbit, Beauty and the Beast) and film producer (The Emperor's New Groove).
- Al Giordano, 63, American journalist (Narco News) and political commentator, lung cancer.
- Richard G. Hovannisian, 90, American historian and professor.
- Christine Hug, 41–42, Swiss lieutenant colonel, traffic collision.
- Sally Kempton, 80, American spiritual writer.
- Brigitte Klump, 88, German author.
- Lyudmila Kononova, 47, Russian politician, member of the Federation Council (2013–2018), Arkhangelsk Oblast Assembly of Deputies (since 2018).
- Esther Kostøl, 86, Norwegian trade unionist.
- Isao Kuwabara, 78, Japanese politician, member of the House of Representatives (2009–2012).
- Eero Lohi, 95, Finnish Olympic modern pentathlete (1960).
- Marga Minco, 103, Dutch journalist and writer.
- Per Odensten, 84, Swedish novelist and poet.
- Adrian Palmer, 4th Baron Palmer, 71, British peer and landowner, member of the House of Lords (since 1990), stroke.
- Ernst-Ludwig Petrowsky, 89, German jazz musician.
- Gavin Royfee, 94, New Zealand cricketer (Canterbury).
- Bob Segarini, 77, American-Canadian musician (The Wackers) and radio presenter.
- JoAnn Watson, 72, American pastor and politician, member of the Detroit City Council (2003–2013).
- Alan Wilkie, 94, Australian meteorologist and weather presenter.

=== 11 ===
- Ahmadreza Ahmadi, 83, Iranian poet and screenwriter.
- George Armstrong, 60, British actor (Grange Hill, Tucker's Luck), leukaemia.
- Michael Bakewell, 92, British television producer.
- Sepp Behr, 93, German Olympic alpine skier (1956, 1960).
- Jorge Bernal Vargas, 94, Mexican Roman Catholic prelate, bishop of Cancún-Chetumal (1974–2004).
- Dale Brede, 48, Australian racing driver (V8 Supercar Championship).
- Tommie Broadwater, 81, American politician, member of the Maryland Senate (1975–1983).
- Leonardo Cavallini, 84, Italian Olympic bobsledder (1968).
- Sam Cutler, 80, English tour manager (The Rolling Stones, Grateful Dead), cancer.
- Philippe Garot, 74, Belgian football player (K.S.K. Beveren, national team) and manager (Francs Borains).
- G. Gnanalingam, 78, Malaysian businessman, chairman of West Port, Malaysia (since 2013).
- Indian Haven, 23, British Thoroughbred racehorse.
- Dmitri Ivanov, 52, Russian football player (Krylia Sovetov Samara, Torpedo Volzhsky, Olimpia Volgograd) and manager.
- Hans-Jochen Jaschke, 81, German Roman Catholic prelate, auxiliary bishop of Osnabrück (1989–1994) and Hamburg (1994–2016).
- Milan Kundera, 94, Czech-French writer (The Joke, The Book of Laughter and Forgetting, The Unbearable Lightness of Being).
- Mercedes Luzuriaga, 95, Spanish actress (Camera Café).
- Ravindra Mahajani, 74, Indian actor (Sarja, Kalat Nakalat, Kaay Raav Tumhi).
- Mantaur, 55, American professional wrestler (WWF, ECW, USWA).
- Pierre Martin, 79, French politician, senator (1995–2014).
- Torleiv Maseng, 76, Norwegian engineer.
- Rebecca Momin, 76, Bangladeshi politician, MP (since 2009).
- Fazil Najafov, 88, Azerbaijani sculptor.
- Helen Nordquist, 91, American baseball player (Rockford Peaches, Kenosha Comets, South Bend Blue Sox).
- Ales Pushkin, 57, Belarusian painter, theatre director, and political prisoner.
- Agim Rada, 70, Albanian sculptor, lung disease.
- C. R. Roberts, 87, American football player (Toronto Argonauts, San Francisco 49ers).
- David Rosenmann-Taub, 96, Chilean poet, musician and artist.
- Richard von Schirach, 81, German sinologist and author.
- Michael "Miles" Standish, 58, American numismatist and author.
- Yuzo Toyama, 92, Japanese composer.
- Oleg Tsokov, 51, Russian general, airstrike.
- Mirsad Tuka, 58, Bosnian actor (Cirkus Columbia, Ja sam iz Krajine, zemlje kestena, Holiday in Sarajevo).
- Sir Peter Walters, 92, British businessman (BP).
- Wang Yingluo, 93, Chinese academic, member of the Chinese Academy of Engineering.

=== 12 ===
- Gustavo Badell, 50, Venezuelan-born Puerto Rican bodybuilder.
- Seilda Baishakov, 72, Kazakh football player (Kairat, Soviet Union national team) and manager.
- Jean Brodie-Hall, 97, Australian landscape architect.
- Jill Churchill, 80, American author.
- Abdulbaki Erol, 74, Turkish Islamic scholar, kidney failure.
- Daniel Goldberg, 74, Canadian film producer (The Hangover, Stripes, Space Jam) and screenwriter.
- Maba Jobe, 58–59, Gambian politician, minister of foreign affairs (2006).
- Nick Köster, 34, South African rugby union player (Bristol, Bath, Western Province).
- Larysa Marshalava, 44, Belarusian actress.
- August Moon, 85, American R&B singer.
- John Nettleton, 94, English actor (Yes Minister, Black Beauty, Oliver Twist).
- Miloslav Netušil, 77, Czech Olympic gymnast (1968, 1972, 1976).
- Ryuchell, 27, Japanese model, suicide.
- Heide Simonis, 80, German politician, minister-president of Schleswig-Holstein (1993–2005) and MP (1976–1988).
- André Watts, 77, American pianist and academic, Grammy winner (1964), Avery Fisher Prize recipient (1988), cancer.
- An Yin, 64, Chinese-American geologist.

=== 13 ===
- Sérgio Amaral, 79, Brazilian diplomat and politician, minister of development (2001–2003) and ambassador to the United States (2016–2019).
- Josette Baisse, 98, French Olympic cross-country skier (1952).
- Ed Bressoud, 91, American baseball player (New York / San Francisco Giants, Boston Red Sox, St. Louis Cardinals), cerebellar ataxia.
- Josephine Chaplin, 74, American actress (The Canterbury Tales, Escape to the Sun, Nuits Rouges).
- Raffaella Cribiore, 75, Italian classical scholar, drowned.
- Geoffrey Davies, 84, English actor (Doctor in the House, Doctor at Large, Oh! What a Lovely War).
- Juan Carlos Durán, 73, Bolivian lawyer, sports executive and politician, minister of the interior (1987–1989) and senator (1993–1994, 1995–1996), cancer.
- Mike Endsley, 61, American politician, member of the Wisconsin State Assembly (2011–2015).
- Marilies Flemming, 89, Austrian politician, MEP (1996–2004).
- Chris Garland, 74, English footballer (Bristol City, Chelsea, Leicester City).
- Carlin Glynn, 83, American actress (The Best Little Whorehouse in Texas, Sixteen Candles, The Trip to Bountiful), Tony winner (1979), complications from dementia and cancer.
- Bill Hartigan, 88, Australian politician, Victoria MLC (1992–1999).
- Edward Hume, 87, American film and television writer (The Day After, The Terry Fox Story, Two-Minute Warning).
- Kalyan Jain, 88, Indian politician, MP (1977–1979).
- Ewen Jones, 63, Australian politician, MP (2010–2016), cancer.
- Guy Lagorce, 86, French journalist (L'Équipe, Le Figaro, Paris Match) and writer.
- Janet McCredie, 88, Australian radiologist.
- Alan Morrow, 86, Australian footballer (St Kilda).
- Kate Morse, 64, Australian archaeologist.
- John Graham Nicholls, 93, British physiologist.
- Pierre Sabatier, 88, French physicist.
- Chérubin Okende Senga, 61, Congolese politician, deputy (2003–2005, since 2018), shot.
- Anthony Stevens, 90, British Jungian analyst, psychiatrist and writer.

=== 14 ===
- Bernard Bachrach, 84, American historian.
- Nick Benedict, 77, American actor (All My Children, The Young and the Restless, Days of Our Lives), complications from spinal surgery.
- Tony Butler, 88, British sports broadcaster (BRMB, BBC Radio WM).
- Dianne Chambless, 75, American clinical psychologist, lung cancer.
- Edward Cocking, 91, British plant scientist.
- Michael Dusek, 64, German football player (Kaiserslautern) and manager (Idar-Oberstein, Pirmasens), cancer.
- Albert Eschenmoser, 97, Swiss organic chemist (Eschenmoser's salt, Eschenmoser fragmentation, Eschenmoser sulfide contraction).
- Luís Rocha Filho, 59, Brazilian lawyer and politician, deputy (2007).
- Stein Føyen, 88, Norwegian Olympic sailor (1964, 1968).
- Carlton Gamer, 94, American composer and music theorist.
- Vítor Godinho, 78, Portuguese footballer (Belenenses, national team).
- Georg Hille, 99, Norwegian Lutheran prelate, bishop of Hamar (1974–1993).
- Gerda Hnatyshyn, 87, Canadian philanthropist, viceregal consort (1990–1995).
- Ashfaqur Rahman Khan, 81, Bangladeshi activist.
- Theodore Khoury, 93, Lebanese Catholic theologian and historian.
- Kazimierz Klimczak, 109, Polish soldier (Warsaw Uprising).
- Blagomir Krivokuća, 78, Serbian football player (Javor Ivanjica, OFK Beograd, Freiburger FC) and manager.
- Ken Lemke, 72, Canadian politician.
- Bulbul Mahalanobish, 70, Bangladeshi singer and author.
- John R. Manz, 77, American Roman Catholic prelate, auxiliary bishop of Chicago (1996–2021).
- Mader Moussayev, 75, Azerbaijani politician, MP (since 1995).
- Ralston Otto, 65, Antiguan cricketer (Leeward Islands), complications from Parkinson's disease.
- Nancy Pyle, 85, American politician, complications from dementia.
- Vladimir Silovanov, 56, Russian football player (Kristall Smolensk, Iskra Smolensk) and manager (Volna Nizhny Novgorod Oblast).
- Hettie Simmons Love, 100, American graduate, one of the first African Americans to earn an Ivy League MBA.
- Beverly Moss Spatt, 99, American public official and preservationist, chair of the New York City Landmarks Preservation Commission (1970–1974).

=== 15 ===
- Darrel Aschbacher, 88, American football player (San Francisco 49ers, Philadelphia Eagles, Saskatchewan Roughriders).
- Elaine Badgley Arnoux, 97, American visual artist and teacher.
- Chen Mao-shuen, 87, Taiwanese composer.
- Arthur Craig, 71, American neuroanatomist and neuroscientist.
- Julius Crosslin, 39, American football player (Dallas Cowboys).
- Dave Currey, 80, American football coach (Long Beach State 49ers, Cincinnati Bearcats).
- Brian Cuthbertson, 87, Canadian historian.
- Marie-Laure de Decker, 75, French photographer.
- Daniel Frasson, 56, Brazilian football player (Figueirense, Inter de Limeira, Palmeiras) and coach.
- Sergei Godunov, 93, Russian mathematician (Godunov's theorem, Godunov's scheme), member of the Russian Academy of Sciences.
- Yrjö Hakala, 91, Finnish Olympic ice hockey player (1952, 1960).
- Leonard Retel Helmrich, 63, Dutch cinematographer, film director and screenwriter (Eye of the Day, Shape of the Moon, Position Among the Stars).
- Peter Takaaki Hirayama, 99, Japanese Roman Catholic prelate, bishop of Oita (1970–2000).
- Francisco Ibáñez Talavera, 87, Spanish comic book artist (Mort & Phil, 13, Rue del Percebe, Rompetechos).
- K. Jayaraman, 67, Indian cricketer (Kerala).
- Billy MacMillan, 80, Canadian ice hockey player (New York Islanders, Toronto Maple Leafs) and coach (New Jersey Devils), Olympic bronze medalist (1968).
- Derek Malcolm, 91, English film critic (The Guardian, Evening Standard) and historian, heart and lung failure.
- Danica Mastilović, 89, Serbian operatic soprano.
- Lew Morrison, 75, Canadian ice hockey player (Pittsburgh Penguins, Philadelphia Flyers, Washington Capitals).
- William O'Malley, 91, American Roman Catholic priest and actor (The Exorcist).
- Veniamin Soldatenko, 84, Kazakh racewalker, Olympic silver medallist (1972).
- Abdourahmane Sow, 81, Senegalese politician, minister of the interior (1995–1998).
- Justyn Vicky, 33, Indonesian bodybuilder and personal trainer, weightlifting accident.
- Steve Winter, 84, American politician.
- James Zagel, 82, American jurist and novelist, judge of the U.S. District Court for Northern Illinois (since 1987) and the FISA Court (2008–2015).

=== 16 ===
- George Alston-Roberts-West, 85, British army officer and courtier.
- Luigi Bettazzi, 99, Italian Roman Catholic prelate (Pact of the Catacombs), auxiliary bishop of Bologna (1963–1966) and bishop of Ivrea (1966–1999).
- Jane Birkin, 76, English-French singer ("Je t'aime... moi non plus") and actress (La Piscine, Evil Under the Sun).
- Ian Emes, 73, British artist (Pink Floyd) and film director.
- Bengt Falck, 96, Swedish scientist.
- Ellen Fitzhugh, 81, American lyricist (Grind, The Great Mouse Detective).
- Harry Frankfurt, 94, American philosopher and author (On Bullshit, On Truth), congestive heart failure.
- Funny Cide, 23, American Thoroughbred racehorse (2003 Kentucky Derby and Preakness winner), colic.
- Yoandy Garlobo, 46, Cuban baseball player (national team), complications from diabetes.
- Brian W. Hill, 91, British historian.
- Franz Hinkelammert, 92, German-born Costa Rican theologian and economist.
- SunRay Kelley, 71, American builder.
- Richard Henry Mills, 93, American jurist, judge of the U.S. District Court for Central Illinois (since 1985).
- Kevin Mitnick, 59, American computer security consultant, author (The Art of Deception, The Art of Intrusion) and convicted hacker, pancreatic cancer.
- Angelo Mozilo, 84, American banker, CEO of Countrywide Financial (1969–2008).
- Yoshinori Ohno, 87, Japanese politician, director general of the defense agency (2004–2005) and MP (1986–2012).
- Paul Prestopino, 83, American multi-instrumental musician and audio engineer.
- Christian Quadflieg, 78, German actor (Star Maidens, Derrick, Der Landarzt).
- Ricky Rivero, 51, Filipino actor (Do Re Mi, Petrang Kabayo, Yorme: The Isko Domagoso Story) and director.
- Dave Skaugstad, 83, American baseball player (Cincinnati Redlegs).
- Annamária Tóth, 77, Hungarian athlete, Olympic bronze medalist (1968).
- Valerija Skrinjar Tvrz, 95, Slovene partisan codebreaker, journalist and translator.
- Bibiana Zeller, 95, Austrian actress (Julia – Eine ungewöhnliche Frau, Kottan ermittelt).

=== 17 ===
- Jerry Bradley, 83, American Hall of Fame music executive (Wanted! The Outlaws).
- Gary Brandt, 80, Canadian football player (Saskatchewan Roughriders).
- Robert Budzynski, 83, French footballer (Nantes, Lens, national team).
- Floyd H. Crain, 94, American politician, member of the Tennessee House of Representatives (1979–1989).
- Buster Cupit, 96, American golfer.
- DJ Deeon, 56, American dance music DJ and producer.
- João Donato, 88, Brazilian jazz and bossa nova pianist.
- Manuel Duarte Velarde, 93, Peruvian agronomist and politician, governor of Junín (2003–2006) and deputy (1990–1992).
- Stuart Epperson, 86, American evangelical and businessman, co-founder of Salem Media Group.
- Bruno Flierl, 96, German architect.
- Valentin Gheorghiu, 95, Romanian pianist and composer.
- Walt Groller, 92, American polka musician.
- Linda Haynes, 75, American actress (Coffy, Rolling Thunder, Brubaker).
- Rudolf Hendel, 75, German Olympic judoka (1972).
- Lech Jęczmyk, 87, Polish publicist (Nowa Fantastyka), essayist, and writer.
- Oleg Khorzhan, 47, Moldovan lawyer and politician, member of the supreme council of Transnistria (2010–2018), stabbed.
- Richard Lynn, 93, English evolutionary psychologist.
- Rubén Martínez Bulnes, 94, Salvadoran architect and sculptor.
- Barry Martyn, 82, English jazz drummer.
- Sue Marx, 92, American documentary film director and producer (Young at Heart), Oscar winner (1987).
- Mangala Narlikar, 80, Indian mathematician, cancer.
- José Bonifácio Novellino, 78, Brazilian economist and politician, member of the Legislative Assembly of Rio de Janeiro (2005–2007), cancer.
- Palhinha, 73, Brazilian football player (Cruzeiro, national team) and manager (União São João).

=== 18 ===
- Alexandre Adler, 72, French historian and journalist (Courrier International, Le Figaro, Libération).
- Paul Kamuza Bakyenga, 79, Ugandan Roman Catholic prelate, bishop (1991–1999) and archbishop (1999–2020) of Mbarara.
- Hans Barchue, Liberian politician, member of the House of Representatives (since 2011).
- David Carr, 91, Australian masters athlete.
- Oommen Chandy, 79, Indian politician, chief minister of Kerala (2004–2006, 2011–2016) and Kerala MLA (since 1970), cancer.
- Miller Farr, 80, American football player (Houston Oilers, St. Louis Cardinals, San Diego Chargers).
- Walter Gilbey, 88, British-Manx politician and entrepreneur, member of the House of Keys (1982–2001).
- Richard W. Goldberg, 95, American jurist, judge of the United States Court of International Trade (since 1991).
- Mike Hellawell, 85, English footballer (Birmingham City, Huddersfield Town, national team).
- Lew Perkins, 78, American athletic director (Wichita State Shockers, UConn Huskies, Kansas Jayhawks).
- B. Sathianathan, 65, Malaysian football player (Negeri Sembilan, national team) and manager, cancer.
- Martha Saxton, 77, American historian, lung cancer.
- Julia Scully, 94, American photography editor.
- Stu Silver, 76, American screenwriter (Throw Momma from the Train) and television writer (Soap, Webster), complications from prostate cancer.
- Keiko Suzuka, 67, Japanese actress.
- Mark Thomas, 67, British film composer (Twin Town, The Final Curtain, Agent Cody Banks 2: Destination London).
- Charley Winner, 99, American football coach (St. Louis Cardinals, New York Jets).
- Larry Yellen, 80, American baseball player (Houston Colt .45s).
- Shintaro Yokota, 28, Japanese baseball player (Hanshin Tigers), brain cancer.

=== 19 ===
- Raymond Bagnis, 91, French-born French Polynesian doctor, ciguatera fish poisoning researcher.
- Wasef Bakhtari, 80, Afghan poet, literary figure, and intellectual.
- Lajos Balázsovits, 76, Hungarian actor (Bizalom, Milarepa, Mary, Mother of Jesus), theatre director and manager, COPD.
- Anthony Bryceson, 88, British academic.
- Anita Carey, 75, English actress (Coronation Street, Doctors), breast cancer.
- Frank Cody, 75, American record producer, A&R and radio executive (KTWV).
- Philippe Doumenc, 89, French novelist.
- Alex Etheridge, 13, American child, bone cancer.
- Tibor Füzessy, 94, Hungarian politician, minister of civilian intelligence services (1992–1994).
- Mike Hammond, 33, British ice hockey player (Nottingham Panthers), traffic collision.
- Silvana Lattmann, 104, Italian-Swiss poet and author.
- Åge Maridal, 58, Norwegian footballer (Start, Fyllingen).
- Robert McFarlane, 80–81, Australian photographer.
- Nguyễn Khánh, 95, Vietnamese politician, deputy prime minister (1987–1997).
- Kole Omotoso, 80, Nigerian writer and intellectual.
- Andrea Purgatori, 70, Italian journalist (Corriere della Sera), screenwriter (The Rubber Wall, The Entrepreneur), and actor, cancer.
- James Reston Jr., 82, American journalist, pancreatic cancer.
- Irina Rozova, 65, Lithuanian journalist and politician, MP (2006–2008, 2012–2020).
- Nohora Tovar, 55, Colombian politician, senator (2014–2018), plane crash.
- Eleanor Vadala, 99, American chemist and materials engineer.
- Remigijus Valiulis, 64, Lithuanian sprinter, Olympic champion (1980).
- Dedric Willoughby, 49, American basketball player (Iowa State Cyclones, Chicago Bulls), heart attack.
- Jean Fagan Yellin, 92, American historian and author.
- Matthias Zimmer, 62, German politician, MP (2009–2021).

=== 20 ===
- Arnaud Bédat, 58, Swiss journalist (L'Illustré) and author.
- Matei-Agathon Dan, 73, Romanian politician, MP (1992–2004) and minister of tourism (1992–1996).
- Merrill J. Fernando, 93, Sri Lankan tea industry executive, founder of Dilmah.
- Jaime Galarza Zavala, 92, Ecuadorian writer, lung disease.
- Concha García Zaera, 93, Spanish digital artist.
- Bill Geddie, 68, American television producer (The View).
- Myron Goldfinger, 90, American architect, liver cancer.
- Luis Hiraldo, 31, Puerto Rican jockey.
- Patricia T. Holland, 81, American Latter-day Saints writer and leader.
- Jahangir Khanji, 67, Pakistani pretender Nawab of Junagarh.
- Raoul Kopelman, 89, Austrian-born American scientist.
- Bambang Kristiono, 62, Indonesian military officer and politician, MP (since 2019).
- Juan Meza, 67, Mexican boxer, WBC super bantamweight champion (1984–1985).
- John P. Monahan, 90, American major general.
- Aadu Must, 72, Estonian historian and politician, MP (since 2007).
- Mirko Novosel, 85, Croatian Hall of Fame basketball player (Lokomotiva) and coach (Napoli, Yugoslavia national team).
- Gustavo Pallicca, 87, Italian sports writer.
- Manjur Rahman Biswas, 73, Bangladeshi politician, MP (1988–1990).
- Rachid Sfar, 89, Tunisian politician, prime minister (1986–1987), minister of finance (1986) and defence (1979–1980).
- Theo Smit, 72, Dutch racing cyclist.
- José Sulantay, 83, Chilean football player (Deportes La Serena) and manager (Coquimbo Unido, Deportes La Serena), stroke.
- Max Wilks, 87, American politician.
- Romain Winding, 71, French cinematographer (La Discrète, The Counterfeiters, Farewell, My Queen).

=== 21 ===
- Hafiz Abdelrahman, Sudanese flautist.
- Gordon Banks, 68, American guitarist.
- Tony Bennett, 96, American singer ("I Left My Heart in San Francisco", "Rags to Riches", "Because of You"), 20-time Grammy winner.
- George Brooks, 97, Czechoslovak-born American designer of jewellery.
- Guillermo Calegari Sr., 98, Argentine Olympic sailor (1972).
- Bill Cashin, 85, Irish politician, senator (1993–1997).
- Marta Chávarri, 62, Spanish socialite.
- Mahabhashyam Chittaranjan, 84, Indian author, Telugu musician and composer.
- Isabelle Choko, 94, Polish Holocaust survivor and chess champion.
- Ann Clwyd, 86, Welsh politician, MP (1984–2019) and MEP (1979–1984).
- Jerome Coopersmith, 97, American television writer (Hawaii Five-O, 'Twas the Night Before Christmas, An American Christmas Carol) and playwright.
- Philip Eaton, 87, American chemist.
- Beverly Prosser Gelwick, 90, American psychologist.
- Aleksandr Gurevich, 92, Russian physicist.
- E. Mavis Hetherington, 96, Canadian psychologist.
- Mike Ivie, 70, American baseball player (San Diego Padres, San Francisco Giants, Detroit Tigers).
- Monte Kwinter, 92, Canadian politician, Ontario MPP (1985–2018).
- Gisela Litz, 100, German contralto singer.
- Petru Marta, 70, Moldovan freestyle wrestler, stroke.
- Juliette Mayniel, 87, French actress (Les Cousins, The Fair, Eyes Without a Face).
- Brian O'Neill, 94, Canadian Hall of Fame ice hockey executive.
- Marcello Osler, 77, Italian racing cyclist.
- Emilio Ostorero, 88, Italian motocross racer and rally driver.
- Hassan Sane'i, 89, Iranian Shia cleric and politician, member of the Expediency Discernment Council (since 1989).
- Jacinto Santos, 82, Portuguese footballer (Benfica, national team).
- Richard O. Simpson, 93, American civil servant, chairman of the U.S. Consumer Product Safety Commission (1973–1976).
- Roy Swetman, 89, English cricketer (Surrey, Nottinghamshire, national team), pneumonia.
- Brian Taber, 83, Australian cricketer (New South Wales, national team).
- Jane Tehira, 95, New Zealand basketball (national team), softball (national team), and field hockey (national team) player.
- Mohammed bin Hamad bin Abdullah Al Thani, 94, Qatari royal and politician, minister of education (1978–1989) and state for culture (1989–1995).
- Chonlathee Thanthong, 85, Thai luk thung composer and singer.
- Miroslav Toman Sr., 88, Czech politician, member of the Federal Assembly (1986–1990), minister of agriculture (1981–1983), traffic collision.
- Malú Urriola, 56, Chilean poet.

=== 22 ===
- Viive Aamisepp, 87, Estonian actress.
- Karim Allawi Homaidi, 95, Iraqi football player (Al-Minaa, national team) and manager (Al-Minaa).
- Jim Alldis Jr., 73, English cricketer.
- Hassan Amcharrat, 75, Moroccan footballer (Chabab Mohammédia, Raja Casablanca, national team).
- Sherry Ayittey, 75, Ghanaian politician and women's activist, minister for environment, science and technology (2009–2013), health (2013–2014), fisheries and aquaculture development (2014–2017).
- Anton Cherepennikov, 40, Russian businessman.
- Aaron Cicourel, 94, American sociologist.
- Ferenc Cserháti, 76, Hungarian Roman Catholic prelate, auxiliary bishop of Esztergom–Budapest (2007–2023).
- Miles Feinstein, 82, American attorney, cancer.
- Lelia Goldoni, 86, American actress (Shadows, Hysteria, Alice Doesn't Live Here Anymore).
- Russell H. Greenan, 97, American author (It Happened in Boston?).
- ASM Enamul Haque, 78, Bangladeshi politician, MP (1996).
- Günther Herrmann, 83, German footballer (Karlsruher SC, Schalke 04, West Germany national team).
- Vince Hill, 89, English singer ("Edelweiss", "Take Me to Your Heart Again").
- Paul Hince, 78, English footballer (Manchester City, Crewe Alexandra) and journalist (Manchester Evening News).
- Ernesto Mastrángelo, 75, Argentine footballer (River Plate, Boca Juniors, national team), idiopathic pulmonary fibrosis.
- Dame Sonia Proudman, 73, British barrister and judge, judge of the High Court (2008–2017).
- Larry Ray, 65, American baseball player (Houston Astros).
- Knut Riisnæs, 77, Norwegian jazz musician.
- Adolf Scherer, 85, Slovak footballer (CH Bratislava, Nîmes, Czechoslovakia national team).
- Roger Sprung, 92, American folk banjo player.
- Marianne Werner, 99, German athlete, Olympic silver medallist (1952).
- Eduardas Vilkelis, 70, Lithuanian economist and politician, minister of finance (1992–1995).

=== 23 ===
- Howard Adelman, 85, Canadian philosopher and academic.
- Earl I. Anzai, 81, American politician, attorney general of Hawaii (1999–2002).
- Salahuddin Ayub, 61, Malaysian politician, twice MP, minister of agriculture (2018–2020) and domestic trade (since 2022), brain hemorrhage.
- Pamela Blair, 73, American actress (A Chorus Line, Annie, Beavis and Butt-Head Do America).
- Brent Budowsky, 71, American journalist (The Hill).
- Andy Dun, 62, English rugby union player (national team).
- Kjell Egil Eimhjellen, 94, Norwegian microbiologist.
- Raymond Froggatt, 81, English songwriter ("Callow-la-vita", "Big Ship", "Rachel") and singer.
- Jacob Golomb, 76, Israeli philosopher.
- Dorothy Goodman, 97, American educator, heart failure.
- William Nicholas Hitchon, 65, British nuclear fusion scientist, subject of the Up film series.
- Adam Inglis, 94, Australian footballer (Carlton).
- Agustín Intriago, 38, Ecuadorian lawyer and politician, mayor of Manta (since 2019), shot.
- Abdul Khaleque Mondal, 78, Bangladeshi politician, MP (2001–2006).
- Gene N. Lebrun, 84, American politician.
- Gwyn Morgans, 91, Welsh footballer (Wrexham, Southport).
- Otello Profazio, 88, Italian cantastorie, folk singer-songwriter, and author.
- Leo Richardson, 91, American basketball (Savannah State, Buffalo Bulls) and football coach (Savannah State).
- Rolf Rustad, 88, Norwegian handball player (national team) and television editor (NRK).
- Patty Ryan, 62, German singer.
- Edward Sexton, 80, British tailor and fashion designer.
- Les Smith, 89, Australian footballer (Collingwood).
- Inga Swenson, 90, American actress (Benson, 110 in the Shade, The Miracle Worker).
- Aleksandr Tsilyurik, 58, Russian footballer (Krylia Sovetov Samara, Spartak-Telekom Shuya, Uralmash Yekaterinburg).
- Kostiantyn Tyshchenko, 81, Ukrainian linguist, teacher and translator.

=== 24 ===
- George Alagiah, 67, British journalist and presenter (BBC News), bowel cancer.
- Leny Andrade, 80, Brazilian singer and musician.
- Marc Augé, 87, French anthropologist.
- Amos Badertscher, 86, American photographer, complications from a fall.
- Chris Bart-Williams, 49, English football player (Nottingham Forest, Sheffield Wednesday, Charlton Athletic) and manager.
- William Boissevain, 96, Australian painter.
- Wendy Brewster, 57, British-born Guyanese-American gynecologist, pancreatic cancer.
- Ethel Bruneau, 87, American-born Canadian dancer.
- Trevor Francis, 69, English football player (Birmingham City, national team) and manager (Sheffield Wednesday), heart attack.
- Mario Hirsch, 74, Luxembourgish journalist.
- Brad Houser, 62, American musician (Edie Brickell & New Bohemians, Critters Buggin), stroke.
- Pat Hunt, 92, New Zealand politician, MP (1978–1984).
- Anne-Chatrine Lafrenz, 86, German Olympic athlete (1956).
- Jesse Lott, 80, American visual artist.
- Alexandre de Lur Saluces, 89, French viticulturist.
- Virginia Mahan, 74, American politician.
- Ahmad Sami Minkara, 85, Lebanese politician, minister of tourism (1992) and education (2004–2005).
- Charles W. Misner, 91, American physicist (Gravitation).
- Dóris Monteiro, 88, Brazilian singer and actress.
- Seiichi Morimura, 90, Japanese novelist.
- Dan Morrison, 75, American baseball umpire.
- Rose Zang Nguele, 76, Cameroonian politician, MP (1992–1997).
- Ronald Numbers, 81, American science historian (The Creationists).
- Cecilia Pantoja, 79, Chilean singer-songwriter.
- Tony Priscott, 82, English footballer (Portsmouth, Aldershot, AFC Bournemouth). (death announced on this date)
- Jayant Savarkar, 87, Indian actor (Vaastav: The Reality, Singham, Rocky Handsome).
- Alexander Solovyov, 73, Russian politician, head of the Udmurt Republic (2014–2017) and senator (2013–2014).
- Adrian Street, 82, Welsh professional wrestler (NWA, CCW), sepsis from colitis.
- Marianna Vardinogiannis, 86, Greek children's rights activist.
- Oswaldo Viteri, 91, Ecuadorian painter.

=== 25 ===
- Jani Allan, 70, South African journalist (Sunday Times) and author (Face Value, Jani Confidential), cancer.
- Mercedes Aragonés de Juárez, 96, Argentine politician, deputy (1993–1999) and governor of Santiago del Estero (2002–2004).
- Julian Barry, 92, American screenwriter (Lenny, The River, Rhinoceros).
- Gérard Besson, 81, Trinidadian writer and publisher.
- Peter Brunt, 87, Scottish gastroenterologist.
- Earl Buford, 81, American police officer, Pittsburgh police chief (1992–1995).
- Pat Carney, 88, Canadian politician, MP (1980–1988) and senator (1990–2008).
- Walter Coles, 95, English cricketer.
- Paul Darmanin, 82, Maltese Roman Catholic prelate, bishop of Garissa (1984–2015).
- Giorgio Di Genova, 89, Italian art historian (History of Italian Art of the Twentieth Century).
- Tristán Falfán, 83, Argentine Olympic boxer (1956).
- Augusto Ferrero Costa, 78, Peruvian jurist, member (2017–2023) and president (2022) of the Constitutional Court, ambassador to Italy (2009–2010).
- Bo Goldman, 90, American screenwriter (One Flew Over the Cuckoo's Nest, Melvin and Howard, Scent of a Woman), Oscar winner (1975, 1980).
- Yılmaz Gruda, 93, Turkish actor (Hercai, İşler Güçler, Yabancı Damat), poet and playwright.
- Roy Harrisville, 101, American theologian.
- Raphick Jumadeen, 75, Trinidadian cricketer (West Indies).
- Shirish Kanekar, 80, Indian writer and journalist.
- Joe Kowal, 67, Canadian ice hockey player (Buffalo Sabres, Rochester Americans, Hershey Bears).
- Johnny Lujack, 98, American football player (Notre Dame Fighting Irish, Chicago Bears), Heisman Trophy winner (1947).
- Paul H. Lysaker, 63, American clinical psychologist.
- Eduardo Pitta, 73, Portuguese poet, fiction writer and essayist.
- Anthony Potts, 59, American major general, plane crash.
- Biff Rose, 85, American singer-songwriter and comedian, liver cancer.
- Tommy Seigler, 84, American professional wrestler.
- Andreas Tsoukalas, 60, Greek singer.
- Rocky Wirtz, 70, American businessman, owner of the Chicago Blackhawks (since 2007) and president of Wirtz Corporation (since 2007).

=== 26 ===
- Ewa Ambroziak, 72, Polish Olympic rower (1976).
- Abdel-Majed Abdel Bary, 32, British rapper and Islamic State militant.
- Umakanta Bairagi, 80, Indian Tokari geet musician.
- Arthur Blanch, 94, Australian country singer.
- Wendy Bowman, 89, Australian farmer and environmentalist.
- Cheng Shu-min, 77, Taiwanese politician, minister of culture (1994–1996), fall.
- Jonathan Cuneo, 70, American lawyer, melanoma.
- Roger Dorchy, 78, French racing driver (24 Hours of Le Mans).
- Patricia A. Goldman, 81, American public official and women's rights advocate, pneumonia.
- John Gough, 93, British Olympic sports shooter (1976).
- Curtis Graves, 84, American politician, member of the Texas House of Representatives (1967–1973).
- Tom Harrison, 78, Canadian-born American baseball player (Kansas City Athletics).
- Jean-Jacques Honorat, 92, Haitian politician, minister of foreign affairs (1991) and prime minister (1991–1992).
- Lâm Quang Mỹ, 79, Vietnamese-Polish poet.
- Henry Logan, 77, American basketball player (Oakland Oaks/Washington Caps).
- Mark Lowery, 66, American politician, treasurer of Arkansas (since 2023) and member of the Arkansas House of Representatives (2013–2023).
- Hilary Lowinger, 79, British clothes designer and receptionist.
- Randy Meisner, 77, American Hall of Fame musician (Eagles, Poco) and songwriter ("Take It to the Limit"), Grammy winner (1976, 1978), complications from COPD.
- Calvin C. Moore, 76, American mathematician.
- Jacques-Yvan Morin, 92, Canadian academic and politician, deputy premier of Quebec (1976–1984).
- Willie Nepomuceno, 75, Filipino impressionist and comedian, complications from a fall.
- Sinéad O'Connor, 56, Irish singer ("Nothing Compares 2 U") and songwriter ("Mandinka", "The Emperor's New Clothes"), Grammy winner (1991), chronic obstructive pulmonary disease and asthma.
- Igor Panchenko, 60, Russian politician, senator (since 2014).
- Wanda Jo Peltier, 90, American politician.
- Chris Preobrazenski, 71, Canadian judoka.
- Geraldo Lyrio Rocha, 81, Brazilian Roman Catholic prelate, bishop of Colatina (1990–2002), archbishop of Vitória da Conquista (2002–2007) and Mariana (2007–2018).
- Alan Schoen, 98, American physicist and computer scientist (Gyroid).
- Surinder Shinda, 70, Indian Punjabi singer, multiple organ failure.
- Fredrik Torp, 86, Norwegian architect.
- Victor Vroom, 90, Canadian psychologist.
- Martin Walser, 96, German writer (Runaway Horse, A Man in Love, Marriage in Philippsburg).
- Helen Williams, 87, American fashion model.

=== 27 ===
- Bobby Arthur, 78, British boxer, lung cancer.
- Beatle Bob, 69, American dancer, complications from amyotrophic lateral sclerosis.
- Ali Ben Salem, 91, Tunisian human rights activist and politician, MP (2014–2019).
- François Castaing, 78, French Hall of Fame automotive executive (Renault, American Motors, Chrysler).
- Pierre Collin, 85, Canadian actor (Seducing Doctor Lewis, Aurore, Ésimésac) and stage director.
- Gordon Dean, 81, Australian politician, solicitor and magistrate, MP (1977–1983).
- Joseph Druar, 60, American Olympic ice dancer (1988), heart failure.
- Fritz Eisenhofer, 96, Austrian-born New Zealand architect.
- Mike Giddings, 89, American football coach (San Francisco 49ers), complications from a stroke.
- Gary Glenn, 65, American politician, member of the Michigan House of Representatives (2015–2018).
- Ruth W. Greenfield, 99, American concert pianist and teacher.
- Margriet Heymans, 90, Dutch writer and illustrator.
- Lloyd Kropp, 86, American novelist and composer.
- Didier Lourenço, 55, Spanish painter, cancer.
- Wayne Maxner, 80, Canadian ice hockey player (Boston Bruins) and coach (Detroit Red Wings).
- Saeed bin Zayed Al Nahyan, 57–58, Emirati politician and businessman.
- Bapusaheb Parulekar, 94, Indian politician, MP (1977–1984).
- Michael Peers, 88, Canadian Anglican bishop, primate of the Anglican Church of Canada (1986–2004).
- Ján Polgár, 94, Slovak footballer (Dynamo ČSD Košice, Křídla vlasti Olomouc, Tatran Prešov). (death announced on this date)
- Rune Richardsen, 60, Norwegian footballer (Lillestrøm, national team).
- Bea Van der Maat, 62, Belgian singer, television presenter and actress (Koko Flanel), assisted suicide.
- Keith Waldrop, 90, American poet.
- Douglas S. Wright, 75, American politician, mayor of Topeka, Kansas (1983–1989).

=== 28 ===
- Ernst Biel, 89, Austrian Olympic speed skater (1956).
- Peter C. Byrne, 97, Irish-American explorer and cryptozoologist.
- Harland Carl, 91, American football player (Chicago Bears).
- Chandini, 5, Indian student, strangled.
- Louis DeLuca, 89, American politician, member of the Connecticut State Senate (1991–2007).
- Saridewi Djamani, 45, Singaporean drug smuggler, execution by hanging.
- Dave Hilton Sr., 82, Canadian boxer.
- Timo Hirvonen, 49, Finnish ice hockey player (Kiekko-Espoo, SaiPa) and coach, complications following cancer surgery.
- Gerd Jüttemann, 89, German psychologist.
- Eddie Long, 90, Canadian ice hockey player (Louisville Rebels, Fort Wayne Komets).
- Danila Comastri Montanari, 74, Italian historical fiction novelist.
- Flor O'Mahony, 77, Irish politician, senator (1981–1987) and MEP (1983–1984).
- Jim Parker, 88, British television composer (Midsomer Murders, House of Cards, Foyle's War).
- Benny Rooney, 80, Scottish football player (St Johnstone, Partick Thistle) and manager (Greenock Morton).
- Tommi Stumpff, 65, German EBM musician.
- Jana Šulcová, 76, Czech actress (I Enjoy the World with You, Horákovi, Fešák Hubert).
- Klaas Veenhof, 87, Dutch professor and Assyriologist.
- Justin Yerbury, 49, Australian molecular biologist, complications from motor neurone disease.

=== 29 ===
- Walter Balderson, 96, American television editor and video engineer.
- Wolfgang Dandorfer, 74, German politician, member of the Landtag of Bavaria (1982–1990) and mayor of Amberg (1990–2014), heart attack.
- Malcolm Deas, 82, English historian.
- Frederick Eberstadt, 97, American fashion photographer and psychotherapist.
- Esther Eillam, 84, Israeli social and feminist activist.
- Marc Gilpin, 56, American actor (Jaws 2, The Legend of the Lone Ranger, Earthbound), brain cancer.
- Thomas Goltz, 68, American writer and journalist.
- Danny Grossman, 80, Canadian dancer and choreographer.
- Barry T. Hannon, 87, American politician.
- Alice K. Ladas, 102, American psychologist and author (The G Spot and Other Recent Discoveries About Human Sexuality).
- Vittorio Prodi, 86, Italian politician, MEP (2004–2014).
- Clive Rowlands, 85, Welsh rugby union player (Pontypool, national team) and coach, fall.
- O'Shae Sibley, 28, American gay dancer and choreographer, stabbed.
- Harry G. Sperling, 98, American psychologist.
- Ken Suarez, 80, American baseball player (Kansas City Athletics, Cleveland Indians, Texas Rangers).
- Nancy Van de Vate, 92, American composer.
- Ben Wilson, 84, American football player (Los Angeles Rams, Green Bay Packers).
- George Wilson, 81, American basketball player (Cincinnati Royals, Chicago Bulls, Seattle SuperSonics).

=== 30 ===
- David Albahari, 75, Serbian writer and translator, member of the Serbian Academy of Sciences and Arts.
- Dragu Bădin, 75, Romanian footballer (Petrolul Ploiești, Universitatea Craiova, Jiul Petroșani).
- Betty Ann Bruno, 91, American journalist (KTVU) and actress (The Wizard of Oz), heart attack.
- Stewart Cameron, 89, British nephrologist.
- Sir Gordon Conway, 85, British agricultural ecologist, blood cancer.
- Jorge Domínguez, 64, Argentine footballer (Gimnasia, Nice, national team).
- Kristian B. Dysthe, 85, Norwegian mathematician.
- William Gackle, 95, American politician, member of the North Dakota House of Representatives (1963–1964, 1967–1980).
- Dan Hester, 74, American basketball player.
- Konrad Klapheck, 88, German painter and graphic artist.
- Alice L. Laffey, 78, American feminist Biblical scholar.
- Ichsan Loulembah, 57, Indonesian journalist and politician, member of the Regional Representative Council (2004–2009).
- Randall Neil Nelson, 97, Canadian politician, Saskatchewan MLA (1975–1982).
- Abner Nuule, 88, Namibian politician, MP (since 1989).
- Chima Centus Nweze, 64, Nigerian jurist, justice of the Supreme Court (since 2014).
- Tibor Parák, 94, Hungarian geologist.
- David W. Potter, 74, Scottish sportswriter.
- Paul Reubens, 70, American actor (Pee-wee's Playhouse, The Nightmare Before Christmas, Blow), hypoxic respiratory failure.
- Vladimiro Roca, 80, Cuban political dissident, complications from diabetes and Alzheimer's disease.
- Frank Rodgers, 82, Northern Irish Gaelic footballer (Beragh Red Knights, Tyrone).
- Kavita Singh, 58, Indian art historian, cancer.
- Ellwyn R. Stoddard, 96, American sociologist.

=== 31 ===
- Leonid Alaev, 90, Russian historian and indologist.
- Phoebe A. Chardon, 90, American politician.
- Angus Cloud, 25, American actor (Euphoria, North Hollywood, The Line), accidental drug overdose.
- Jimmy Cooney, 68, Irish hurler (Sarsfields, Galway) and referee.
- Rusi Cooper, 100, Indian cricketer (Parsis, Bombay, Middlesex).
- Bob Dawson, 102, Australian footballer (St Kilda).
- Carol Duvall, 97, American television host (The Carol Duvall Show).
- Carl-Erik Eriksson, 93, Swedish six-time Olympic bobsledder.
- Sophie Fillières, 58, French film director (Good Girl, If You Don't, I Will) and screenwriter (Sombre).
- María Fux, 101, Argentine dancer and choreographer.
- Surat Huseynov, 64, Azerbaijani military officer and politician, prime minister (1993–1994), gastric bleeding.
- Inga Landgré, 95, Swedish actress (The Seventh Seal, The Girl with the Dragon Tattoo, Crisis).
- Jim Larkin, 74, American journalist and publisher (Phoenix New Times), suicide by gunshot.
- Jim Lee, 77, British photographer and film director, cancer.
- W. Jason Morgan, 87, American geophysicist.
- Gareth Morse, 91, Welsh-Australian painter.
- Wes Nisker, 80, American author and Buddhism instructor, complications from Lewy body dementia.
- Idegarda Oliveira, 92, Angolan singer and composer.
- Liliane Pierre-Paul, 70, Haitian journalist, activist, and radio broadcaster.
- Jan Przewoźnik, 65, Polish chess player.
- Vakkom Purushothaman, 95, Indian politician, governor of Mizoram (2011–2014) and Tripura (2014), MP (1984–1991).
- Anthony C. E. Quainton, 89, American diplomat, director general of the Foreign Service (1995–1997).
- Mel Roach, 90, American baseball player (Milwaukee Braves, Chicago Cubs, Philadelphia Phillies).
- Roberto Cintli Rodríguez, 69, Mexican-American columnist, author, and academic (Mexican American studies), heart failure.
- Yuliia Shevchenko, 24, Ukrainian activist and soldier, airstrike.
- Edward Slinger, 85, English cricketer (Marylebone), solicitor and judge.
- Dušan Velič, 56, Slovak chemist and politician, traffic collision.
- Melaku Worede, 86–87, Ethiopian geneticist.
