= Kestel =

Kestel may refer to:

- Kestel (archaeological site), an archaeological site in Niğde Province, Turkey
- Kestel, Bursa, a district and municipality in Bursa Province, Turkey
- Kestel, Alanya, a neighbourhood in Alanya, Antalya Province, Turkey
- Kestel, Bucak, a village in Burdur Province, Turkey
- Kestel, Nazilli, a neighbourhood in Nazilli, Aydın Province, Turkey
- Kestel Dam, a dam and reservoir near Bergama, Izmir Province, Turkey
- Paul Kestel, a German politician
- Kestel, Croatian name of Keszthely, a town in Hungary

== See also ==
- Kestell, a town in South Africa
