= Kuwabara =

Kuwabara (written: 桑原 lit. "mulberry field") is a Japanese surname. Notable people with the surname include:

- Bruce Kuwabara (born 1949), Canadian architect
- Hiroyoshi Kuwabara (born 1971), Japanese football player
- Isao Kuwabara (1945–2023), Japanese politician (Democratic Party of Japan).
- Kineo Kuwabara (1913–2007), Japanese photographer and editor
- Ryan Kuwabara (桑原 ライアン 春男; born 1972), Japanese ice hockey player
- Honinbo Shusaku (1829–1862), born as Torajirō Kuwabara, Japanese Go player
- Shigeharu Kuwabara (桑原 秀治; born 1940), Japanese water polo player
- Shisei Kuwabara (born 1936), Japanese photojournalist

== Fictional characters ==
- Kazuma Kuwabara, a character in YuYu Hakusho media
- Shizuru Kuwabara, a character in YuYu Hakusho media
- Kuwabara Hon'inbo, a character in Hikaru no Go media

== See also ==
- "Kuwabara kuwabara", a Japanese phrase which is said to ward off lightning
