= Joan Freeman =

Joan Freeman may refer to:

- Joan Freeman (actress) American actress
- Joan Freeman (British psychologist) (1935–2023)
- Joan Freeman (politician) (born 1958), Irish psychologist and politician
- Joan Maie Freeman (1918–1998), Australian physicist
