= Gackle =

Gackle may refer to:

- Gackle, North Dakota, an American city
- William Gackle (1927–2023), American politician
