= Badertscher =

Badertscher is a surname. Notable people with the surname include:

- Amos Badertscher (1936–2023), American photographer
- Christine Badertscher (born 1982), Swiss politician

== See also ==
- Bayerischer Rundfunk
