= Richard Simpson =

Richard, Rich, Richie, Rick, or Rik Simpson may refer to

== Arts and entertainment ==
- Richard James Simpson (born 1967), American singer and guitarist
- Chubb Rock (Richard Simpson, born 1968), Jamaican-American rapper
- Rick Simpson, American set decorator
- Rik Simpson, British record producer, musician and songwriter

== Law and politics ==
- Richard F. Simpson (1798–1882), U.S. representative from South Carolina
- Richard M. Simpson (1900–1960), U.S. representative from Pennsylvania
- Richard H. Simpson (1905–1968), American politician in Florida
- Dick Simpson (politician) (born 1940), American politician in Chicago
- Richard Simpson (Scottish politician) (born 1942), Scottish politician

== Religion ==
- Richard Simpson (martyr) (c. 1553–1588), English Catholic priest
- Richard Simpson (writer) (1820–1876), British Roman Catholic writer and literary scholar
- Rick Simpson (bishop) (Richard Lee Simpson, born 1966), British Anglican bishop

== Sports ==
- Richard Simpson (rugby union) (c. 1885–?), rugby union player who represented Australia
- Dick Simpson (born 1943), American baseball outfielder
- Richie Simpson (born 2003), Scottish rugby union player

== Others ==
- Richard Hope Simpson (1930–2016), British classical archaeologist
- Richard O. Simpson (1930–2023), American businessman
- Richard J. Simpson, Australian professor of biochemistry

== Other uses ==
- Rick Simpson Oil, cannabis preparation
