= Rubén Martínez =

Rubén Martínez may refer to:

- Rubén Martínez Bulnes (1929–2023), Salvadoran sculptor
- Rubén Martínez Dalmau (born 1970), Spanish politician
- Rubén Martínez (footballer, born 1964), Chilean footballer
- Rubén Martínez (footballer, born 1984), Spanish footballer
- Rubén Martínez Granja (born 1989), Spanish footballer
- Rubén Martínez Huelmo (1949–2025), Uruguayan politician
- Rubén Martínez Puente (1941/2–2021), Cuban politician
- Rubén Martínez Villena (1899–1934), Cuban writer
- Rubén Martínez (writer) (born 1962), American writer
