= Cheri Pies =

Writer and professor of public health

- Born: Cheramy Anne Pies; November 26, 1949
- Died: July 4, 2023 (aged 73)
- Other name: Cheri Anne Pies

Academic background
- Education: University of California, Berkeley
- Thesis: Controversies in context : ethics, values, and policies concerning Norplant (1993)

Cheri Pies (Cheramy Anne Pies; November 26, 1949 – July 4, 2023) was an American academic known for her work on parenthood and lesbians. She was a professor emerita of public health at the University of California, Berkeley.

== Early life and education ==
Pies as born in Los Angeles and grew up in the San Fernando Valley of California. She graduated from Birmingham High School, and then received her bachelor's degree from Berkeley in 1971. In 1976 she obtained a master's degree in social work from Boston University. She later received a second master's degree from the University of California, Berkeley, and went on to earn a Ph.D. from the same institution in 1993.

== Career ==
Pies was known for her work on lesbian parenthood and for inequalities in access to health care. In the 1970s Pies worked with Planned Parenthood and was giving workshops for people considering parenting. Starting in the 1980s she led workshops and programs for lesbians considering parenting. She coordinated projects centered on lesbians who had been artificially inseminated, and coordinated research examining the relevance of HIV/AIDS in lesbian mothers. She later examined the impact of cash incentives when decisions about reproduction are being considered. She collaborated with Michael Lu at Berkeley to study health conditions in financially-challenged neighborhoods.

In 1985, she published Considering Parenthood: A Workbook for Lesbians, one the first ever parenting books for lesbians published in the United States.

Pies died of cancer in 2023.

== Selected publications ==
- Pies, Cheri (1985-01-01). Considering Parenthood: A Workbook for Lesbians (First ed.). Spinsters Ink.
- Pies, Cheri (1989). "Insemination: Something More to Consider". In Rieder, Ines; Ruppelt, Patricia (eds.). Matters of life and death : women speak about AIDS. Internet Archive. London : Virago. pp. 121–124. ISBN 978-1-85381-103-6.
- Wang, Caroline C.; Pies, Cheri A. (2004). "Family, Maternal, and Child Health Through Photovoice". Maternal and Child Health Journal. 8 (2): 95–102. doi:10.1023/B:MACI.0000025732.32293.4f. hdl:2027.42/45326. ISSN 1092-7875.
- Pies, Cheri; Kotelchuck, Milton (2014). "Bringing the MCH Life Course Perspective to Life". Maternal and Child Health Journal. 18 (2): 335–338. doi:10.1007/s10995-013-1408-5. ISSN 1092-7875.
- Best Babies Zone Initiative Team; Pies, Cheri; Barr, Monica; Strouse, Carly; Kotelchuck, Milton (2016). "Growing a Best Babies Zone: Lessons Learned from the Pilot Phase of a Multi-Sector, Place-Based Initiative to Reduce Infant Mortality". Maternal and Child Health Journal. 20 (5): 968–973. doi:10.1007/s10995-016-1969-1. ISSN 1092-7875.

== Honors and awards ==
In 2018 a division of the U.S. Department of Health and Human Services recognized Pies with the Maternal and Child Health Bureau Director’s Award for her work in improving access to public health.
