= Stein Føyen =

Norwegian sailor

Stein Arne Føyen (born 11 February 1935) is a Norwegian former sailor who competed in the 1964 Summer Olympics and in the 1968 Summer Olympics.
