= Joe Irukwu =

Nigerian insurance broker (1934–2023)

Joseph Ogbonnaya Irukwu (20 July 1934 – 7 July 2023) was a Nigerian insurance executive, lawyer, lecturer and author who wrote published works about the insurance industry in Africa. He was also a president of Ohaneze Ndigbo, an ethno-political and social group that represents the interest of Igbos in the Nigerian polity.

Irukwu was the founding managing director of Nigerian Reinsurance Corporation, in 1989, he founded African Development Insurance Company which was later sold to Diamond Bank.

== Life ==
Irukwu was born on 20 July 1934. He obtained his degree in Law and Insurance from a British university in 1962. Upon returning to Nigeria, he found employment with West African Provincial Insurance Company, a British firm operating out of Lagos. Originally, a legal adviser, he rose within the firm and joined the managerial cadre of the firm's insurance department in 1965. In 1970, he was appointed chief executive officer of Unity Life and Fire Insurance Company and it was while working at Unity that his profile began to rise. In 1972, the government appointed him head of the student loans board, a committee with the responsibility to disburse loans to thousands of students. In 1977, Irukwu became the pioneer chief executive of Nigerian Reinsurance Corporation, a government owned business established to increase the local share of reinsurance premium income. Prior to the establishment of the firm, insurance firms in Nigeria, conducted reinsurance transactions with foreign companies. To boost the local insurance market and reduce foreign exchange out-flow, the government founded Nigerian Re. The new firm was given the right of first refusal for any reinsurance transaction to be conducted in Nigeria. One of Irukwu's main challenges was to recruit and train talent in a line of business that was new to Nigeria. The firm engaged foreign institutions in the training of workers and sponsored a training school in Lagos.

=== Academic career ===
In the early 1970s, Irukwu began to conduct lectures in actuarial science at University of Lagos. In addition, he was involved in developing training programs at the West African Insurance Companies Association (WAICA) and at the West African Insurance Institute.

Irukwu published his first book, Insurance Law and Practice in Nigeria in 1967 and his second book, Accident and Motor Insurance in West Africa was published in 1974. His third book, Insurance Management in Africa was published in 1976.

== Death ==
Irukwu died on 7 July 2023, at the age of 88.

== Works ==
- Irukwu, J.O. (1977). Insurance management in Africa. Ibadan: Caxton Press.
- Irukwu, J. O. (1974). Accident and motor insurance in West Africa: Law & practice. Ibadan: Caxton Press.
- Irukwu, J.O. (1991). Insurance law and practice in Nigeria ([4th ed. ?] ed.). Ibadan: Heinemann Educational Books. ISBN 9781294981.
- Irukwu, J. (1983). Nigeria at the crossroads : a nation in transition. London: Witherby. ISBN 0900886714. OCLC 11001093.
- O., Irukwu, J. (2014). Nigeria at 100 : What next?. Ibadan: Safari Books. ISBN 9789788431695.
