= Hettie Simmons Love =

First Black Ivy League MBA graduate (1922–2023)

- Born: October 29, 1922; Jacksonville, Florida, U.S.
- Died: July 14, 2023 (aged 100); Harrisburg, Pennsylvania, U.S.
- Education: Fisk University
- Known for: One of the first African Americans to earn a Master of Business Administration from the Wharton School of the University of Pennsylvania

Hettie Simmons Love (October 29, 1922 – July 14, 2023) was one of the first African-Americans to earn a Master of Business Administration (MBA) degree from any Ivy League University. She graduated from the Wharton School of the University of Pennsylvania in 1947.

== Biography ==
Born in Jacksonville, Florida, in 1922, Hettie Simmons Love attended Fisk University and graduated in 1943. She then attended Penn's Wharton School, graduating with her MBA on June 18, 1947. A 2017 article in the Wharton Magazine described her as a "trailblazer" who "open[ed] the door for both minorities and women in the study of business management". She recalled that she was the only Black student at Wharton when she attended, and one of only two women in her class, but found colleagues among three Jewish male classmates who invited her to join their study group. The Black sorority, Alpha Kappa Alpha, which she joined at Fisk University in 1941, honored her at their Atlanta convention in 2016. The Wharton School honored her later that year at its annual Whitney M. Young Conference, in December 2016.

Simmons married George Hayward Love, Sr., who received Bachelor's, Master's, and PhD degrees from the University of Pennsylvania and who became the first African-American employed as a high school teacher in the Philadelphia school system. The Loves later moved to Harrisburg, Pennsylvania, where George supervised the desegregation of schools, and where they raised their children. They were married 66 years until his death in 2014.

Simmons Love turned 100 on October 29, 2022, and died at her home on July 14, 2023.
