= Kevin White (footballer) =

Australian rules footballer (1933–2023)

Personal information
- Full name: Kevin William White
- Born: 21 March 1933
- Died: 8 July 2023 (aged 90)
- Original team: Spotswood
- Height: 175 cm (5 ft 9 in)
- Weight: 71 kg (157 lb)

Playing career^{1}
Years	Club	Games (Goals)
1953–54, 1956	Footscray	9 (0)
- ^{1} Playing statistics correct to the end of 1956.

Kevin William White (21 March 1933 – 8 July 2023) was an Australian rules footballer who played with Footscray in the Victorian Football League (VFL).
