= Gustavo Pallicca =

Italian writer (1936–2023)

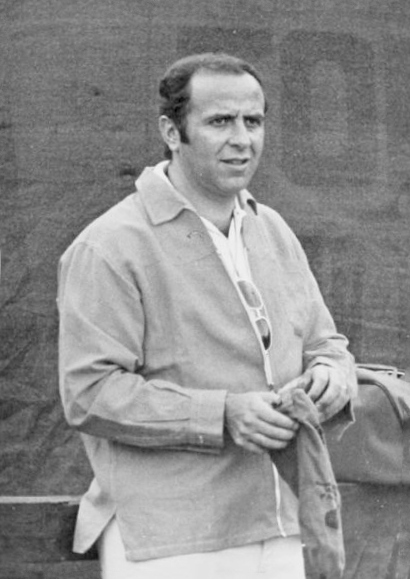
- Born: 4 January 1936; Turin, Italy
- Died: 20 July 2023 (aged 87); Florence, Italy
- Occupation: Writer
- Writing career
- Language: Italian
- Genre: Sport

Gustavo Pallicca (4 January 1936 – 20 July 2023) was an Italian writer and athletics starter.

== Biography ==
In his career as a writer Pallicca published twelve books, mostly about sport.

He died in Florence on 20 July 2023, at the age of 87.

== Books ==
- Ai vostri posti, pronti, via (On your marks, get set, go), FIDAL 1996
- Arturo Maffei: un salto...lungo una vita (Arturo Maffei, a jump...long a lifetime), Capezzano Pianore, Grafics 1999
- A world history of sprint racing: the stellar events: 100 m, 200 m and 4x100 m relay: men and women (1850–2005), with Roberto L. Quercetani, Cassina de Pecchi 2006 – ISBN 978-88-87110-75-3
- I figli del vento. Storia dei 100 metri ai giochi olimpici. Vol. 1: Le origini da Atene 1896 a Londra 1908. (The sons of the wind: the history of the 100 meters at the Olympic Games – Vol.1 The origins: from Athens 1896 to London 1908), Simple 2006 – ISBN 978-88-89177-77-8
- I figli del vento: la storia dei 100 metri ai Giochi Olimpici – Vol.2: L'affermazione : da Stoccolma 1912 a Los Angeles 1932 (The sons of the wind: the history of the 100 meters at the Olympic Games – Vol.2 The statement: from Stockholm 1912 to Los Angeles 1932), Edizioni Riva 2009 ISBN 978-88-90298-82-0
