= Kazimierz Klimczak =

Polish soldier (1914–2023)

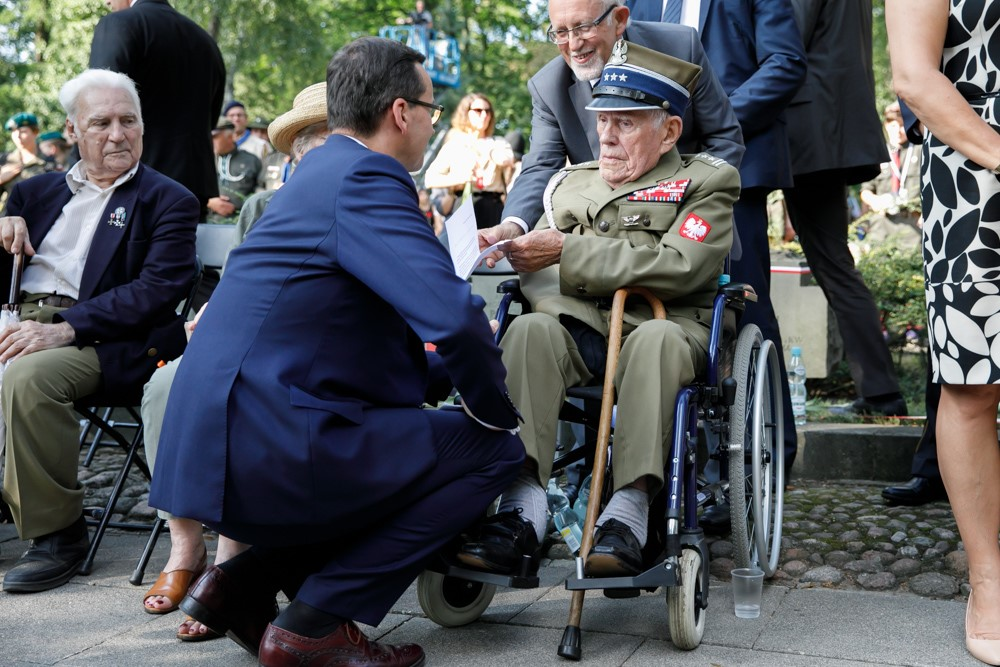
- Kazimierz Klimczak with Prime Minister Mateusz Morawiecki in 2018
- Born: 12 February 1914; Ciepłowo
- Died: 14 July 2023 (aged 109)
- Burial place: Powązki Cemetery, Warsaw
- Military career
- Allegiance: Second Polish Republic; Polish People's Republic; Poland
- Branch: Polish Armed Forces; Home Army; Polish People's Army
- Service years: 1936-1946
- Rank: Pułkownik (Colonel)
- Nickname: Szron
- Units: 67th Infantry Regiment; Ochota Subdistrict of the Home Army
- Commands: Platoon commander
- Conflicts: Second World War
- Awards

Kazimierz Klimczak (15 February 1914 – 14 July 2023) was a Polish soldier. He turned 100 on 15 February 2014, and died on 14 July 2023, at the age of 109. At the time of his death, he was the oldest living Warsaw Uprising veteran and the oldest living man in Poland.

== Biography ==
Klimczak was born into a large family, he had six brothers and five sisters. He graduated from the School for Minors No. 1 in Konin. From 1936 he served in the Polish Army. He graduated from the school of non-commissioned officer instructors and began his service in the 67th Infantry Regiment in Brodnica. In its ranks he took part in the fights of the Pomeranian Army during the Invasion of Poland. He took part in the fights near Mełno near Grudziądz and the Battle of the Bzura, where he was seriously wounded. He was taken to the Ujazdów Hospital for treatment.

As a war invalid, he established contact with the Union of Armed Struggle, then became a soldier of the Home Army. During the occupation, he worked in the Tobacco Monopoly in Warsaw. During the Warsaw Uprising, he fought in the rank of sergeant in Wola in the Ochota Subsistrict. He left Warsaw with the civilian population. He was taken prisoner, but managed to escape from the transport. In February 1945 he returned to the capital. Until 1946 he served in the car regiment of the Polish People's Army, as commander of the transport platoon.

In the Third Polish Republic he was involved in veterans' activities as a member of the Association of War Disabled Persons of the Republic of Poland.

He died on July 14, 2023 at the age of 109, the oldest man in Poland. On July 28, 2023 he was buried in a family grave at the Powązki Cemetery in Warsaw. The ceremonies were of a state nature with military ceremonial.

== Awards and decorations ==
- Officer's Cross of the Order of Polonia Restituta
- Knight's Cross of the Order of Polonia Restituta
- Silver Medal of Merit for National Defence
- Bronze Medal of Merit for National Defence
- Warsaw Uprising Cross
- Medal for Long Marital Life
- Pro Patria Medal
- Pro Bono Poloniae Medal
- Commemorative medal of the 70th anniversary of the Warsaw Uprising
- Medal of Blessed Father Jerzy Popiełuszko
