= Enzo Bartocci =

Italian politician (1929–2023)

Member of the Chamber of Deputies of Italy
- In office 1 July 1976 – 19 June 1979

Personal details
- Born: 15 May 1929 Rome, Italy
- Died: 10 July 2023 (aged 94)
- Party: PSI
- Occupation: Sociologist

Enzo Bartocci (15 May 1929 – 10 July 2023) was an Italian sociologist and politician. A member of the Italian Socialist Party, he served in the Chamber of Deputies from 1976 to 1979.

Bartocci died on 10 July 2023, at the age of 94.
