= Anton Cherepennikov =

Russian businessperson (1983–2023)

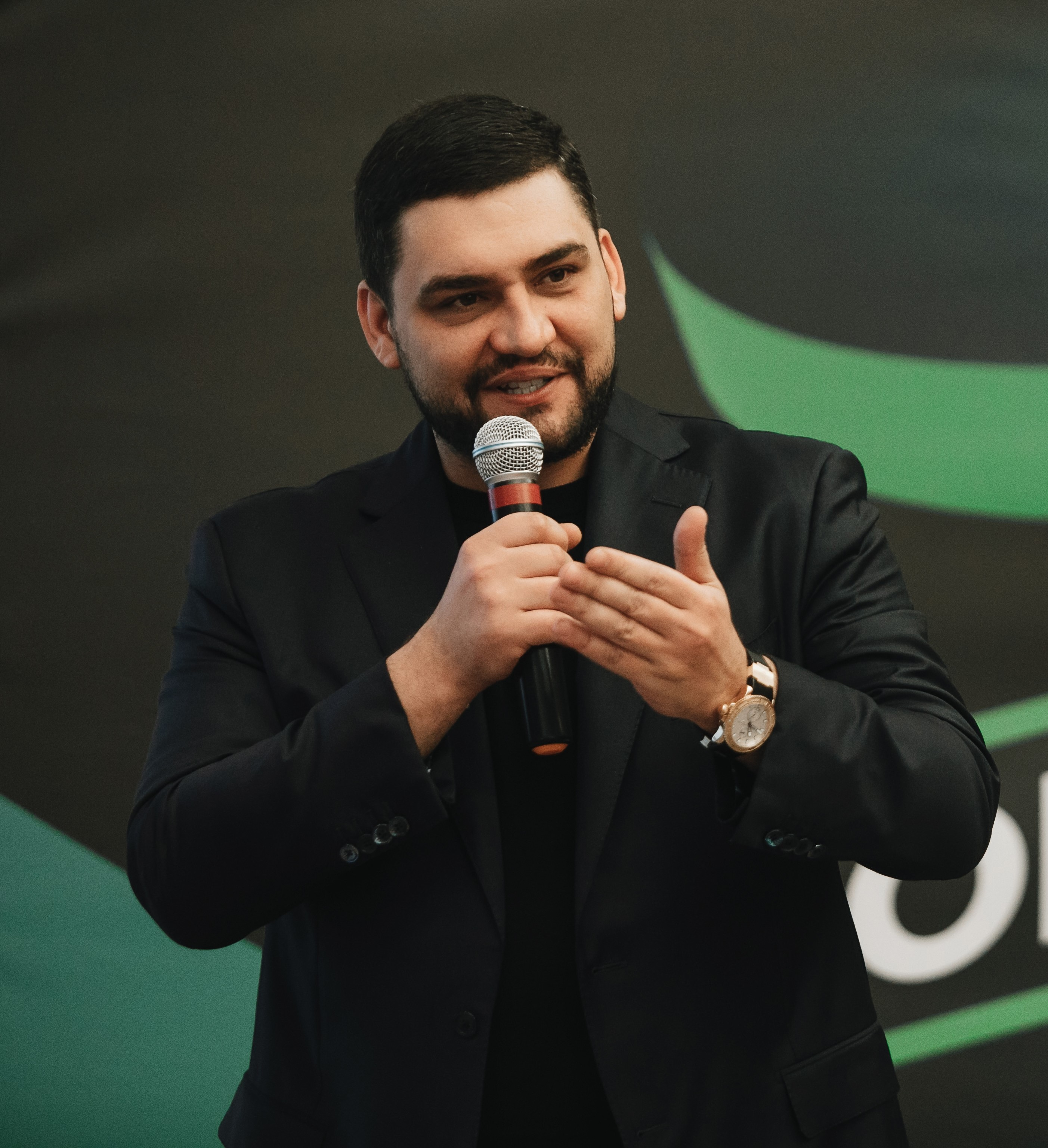
Anton Cherepennikov in 2019

Anton Andreevich Cherepennikov (7 May 1983–22 July 2023) was a Russian millionaire. He founded ICS Holding, also known as IKS Holding or X Holding, a Russian technology conglomerate. He was, and his company still is, on the OFAC sanctions list. His company has been alleged to have been involved in the mass surveillance of Russian citizens.

He was found dead in his apartment in 2023.
