= Gary Brandt =

Canadian gridiron football player (1943–2023)

No. 54
- Positions: Guard, Tackle

Personal information
- Born: April 11, 1943; Regina, Saskatchewan, Canada
- Died: July 17, 2023 (aged 80); Hampstead, North Carolina, U.S.
- Listed height: 6 ft 1 in (1.85 m)
- Listed weight: 220 lb (100 kg)

Career information
- College: Washington

Career history
- 1967–1977: Saskatchewan Roughriders

Gary Brandt (April 11, 1943 – July 17, 2023) was a professional Canadian football offensive lineman who played eleven seasons in the Canadian Football League for the Saskatchewan Roughriders from 1967 through 1977.

Brandt died in Hampstead, North Carolina on July 17, 2023, at the age of 80.
