= Nohora Tovar =

Colombian politician (1967–2023)

Senator of Colombia
- In office 20 July 2014 – 20 July 2018

Personal details
- Born: Nohora Stella Tovar Rey; 21 September 1967 Villavicencio, Meta, Colombia
- Died: 19 July 2023 (aged 55) San Luis de Gaceno, Boyacá, Colombia

Nohora Stella Tovar Rey (21 September 1967 – 19 July 2023) was a Colombian politician and business executive. She was a member of the Senate of Colombia from 2014 to 2018 representing Democratic Center. Tovar was killed in a plane crash on 19 July 2023.

== Biography ==
Tovar was born in Villavicencio. She studied business administration at Saint Martin University, specializing in management skills development at the Pontificia Universidad Javeriana. She was kidnapped in 2000 by the FARC guerrillas for four months. Between 2001 and 2005 she was the director of the FENALCO section of Meta. In 2011, she aspired to be mayor of Villavicencio endorsed by the party Indigenous Authorities of Colombia, obtaining 8,813 votes in which she did not reach the position.

In 2011, Tovar served as manager of the Meta sectional CASABE Food Plan. In 2012 she was appointed Executive President of the Public Improvement Society and in 2013 General Manager of Chrysler Dealership. In the 2014 Colombian parliamentary election, she was elected Senator of the Republic by the Democratic Center party, a political party founded by former president Álvaro Uribe until 2018. Between 2019 and 2021, Tovar served as the Colombian ambassador to the Dominican Republic during the presidency of Iván Duque.

== Death ==
On 19 July 2023, at around 8:00 a.m. Tovar was traveling from Villavicencio to Guaymaral Airport in a Cessna 210N light aircraft with registration HK5138 heading to the Colombian capital Bogotá to meet with Uribe. The aircraft crashed to the ground, killing six people in the process, including Tovar and her husband. She was 55.
