= Lyudmila Kononova =

Russian politician (1976–2023)

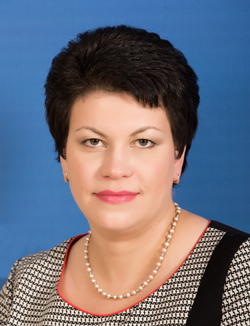
- Kononova in 2013

Member of the Federation Council of Russia for Arkhangelsk Oblast
- In office 16 October 2013 – 21 September 2018
- Preceded by: Vladimir Rushailo
- Succeeded by: Viktor Novozhilov

Personal details
- Born: Lyudmila Pavlovna Kononova; 7 January 1976 Semiozerye, Primorsky District, Arkhangelsk Oblast, Russian SFSR, USSR
- Died: 10 July 2023 (aged 47) Arkhangelsk, Russia
- Party: United Russia
- Education: Pomorsky State University
- Occupation: Lawyer

Lyudmila Pavlovna Kononova (Russian: Людмила Павловна Кононова; 7 January 1976 – 10 July 2023) was a Russian lawyer and politician. A member of United Russia, she served in the Federation Council from 2013 to 2018.

Kononova died in Arkhangelsk on 10 July 2023, at the age of 47.
