= Gavin Royfee =

New Zealand cricketer (1929–2023)

Personal information
- Full name: Gavin Ernest Royfee
- Born: 20 February 1929; Christchurch, New Zealand
- Died: 10 July 2023 (aged 94); Spreydon, Christchurch, New Zealand
- Batting: Right-handed

Domestic team information
- Years: Team
- 1952-53: Canterbury

Career statistics
Competition	First-class
Matches	3
Runs scored	75
Batting average	15.00
100s/50s	0/0
Top score	41
Balls bowled	0
Wickets	–
Bowling average	–
5 wickets in innings	–
10 wickets in match	–
Best bowling	–
Catches/stumpings	1/–
- Source: Cricinfo, 28 September 2019

Gavin Ernest Royfee (20 February 1929 – 10 July 2023) was a New Zealand cricketer who played three matches of first-class cricket for Canterbury in the 1952–53 season.

An opening batsman, Gavin Royfee scored 41 and 15 on his first-class debut against Auckland, but was unsuccessful in his next two matches. He played for 16 years for Lancaster Park-Woolston in the Christchurch competition, scoring more than 4000 runs.

Royfee attended Cathedral Grammar School in Christchurch, and later returned to the school to work as its bursar. He died at his home in the Christchurch suburb of Spreydon in July 2023, aged 94.
