= Marta Chávarri =

Spanish socialite (1960–2023)

Marta Chávarri de Figueroa
- Born: Marta Chávarri de Figueroa; 1 August 1960; Madrid, Spain
- Died: 21 July 2023 (aged 62); Madrid, Spain
- Spouse(s): Fernando Falcó y de Córdoba (m. 1982; div. 1989) Alberto Cortina (m. 1991; div. 1995)
- Children: 1

Marta Chávarri de Figueroa (1 August 1960 – 21 July 2023) was a Spanish socialite known as the first it girl in Spain.

== Early life and education ==
Born in Madrid to diplomat Tomás Chávarri and Matilde Figueroa, Chávarri spent much of her childhood in the United States. Her maternal grandfather was the Marquis of Santo Floro.

== Personal life ==
On 4 September 1982, she married Fernando Falcó y de Córdoba, 3rd Marquis of Cubas, in Plasencia Cathedral. Their union, celebrated in the family's 15th-century Palace of Mirabel, produced one son, Álvaro (b. 1983), and placed Chávarri at the centre of Spain's aristocracy. Her relaxed, “preppy” style, reminiscent of Princess Diana, made her a sought-after magazine subject and a touchstone for young members of la alta sociedad.

In February 1989, Diez Minutos published photographs of Chávarri leaving a Vienna hotel with billionaire contractor Alberto Cortina, revealing an extramarital affair that captivated the nation. A second set of images, printed on 14 February by Interviú and showing her in a nightclub without underwear, shattered previous limits on Spanish tabloid coverage and broke the magazine's sales record. The fallout was swift: Falcó filed for divorce and gained custody of their son; Cortina lost the chairmanship of Construcciones y Contratas during a contested banking merger.

Chávarri married Cortina in 1991; the couple divorced in 1995. Subsequent relationships included entrepreneur Philippe Junot and British sculptor Richard Hudson. She frequently litigated against invasive press coverage, winning notable damages from Interviú in 1994. After a serious fall that required facial surgery, she withdrew from public life, devoting time to painting and travel but occasionally reappearing at family events, including her son's 2022 wedding.
