= Ling Yongshun =

Chinese academic (1937–2023)

- 凌永顺
- Born: 2 April 1937; Dingyuan County, Anhui, China
- Died: 2 July 2023 (aged 86); Beijing, China
- Education: Beijing Normal University
- Scientific career
- Fields: Electronic countermeasures technology
- Workplaces: PLA Electronic Engineering Institute

Chinese name
- Simplified Chinese: 凌永顺
- Traditional Chinese: 凌永順
Transcriptions
Standard Mandarin
- Hanyu Pinyin: Líng Yǒngshùn

Ling Yongshun (Chinese: 凌永顺; 2 April 1937 – 2 July 2023) was a Chinese academic specializing in electronic countermeasures technology, and an academician of the Chinese Academy of Engineering.

== Biography ==
Ling was born in Dingyuan County, Anhui, on 2 April 1937. He secondary studied at Jiashan High School (now Mingguang High School). In 1956, he enrolled at Beijing Normal University, where he majored in physics.

After university in 1960, Ling was despatched as a trainee teaching assistant to Harbin Military Engineering Institute (now Harbin Engineering University) and subsequently a physics teacher at Xi'an Armoured Reconnaissance Engineering College the next year. In December 1969, he was sent to the May Seventh Cadre Schools to do farm works, and joined the Chinese Communist Party (CCP) in April 1970. He was reinstated in June 1972, when he was appointed an official of the Xi'an Armoured Reconnaissance Engineering College. In June 1976, he became an official at the Anhui Electric Power Design Institute (now Anhui Electric Power Design Institute Co., Ltd. of China Energy Engineering Corporation), and served until May 1980, when he was recruited as a professor at the PLA Electronic Engineering Institute.

=== Personal life and death ===
Ling had two daughters. On 2 July 2023, Ling died in Beijing, at the age of 86.

== Honours and awards ==
- 1992 State Technological Invention Award (Second Class)
- 1996 State Science and Technology Progress Award (Second Class)
- 1997 Member of the Chinese Academy of Engineering (CAE)
- 1998 State Science and Technology Progress Award (Second Class)
- 2009 State Science and Technology Progress Award (Second Class)
