= Jane Tehira =

New Zealand sportsperson (1928–2023)

Jane Tehira ONZM
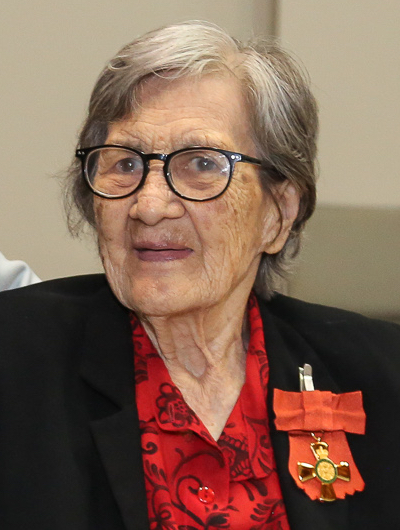
- Tehira at her investiture in 2022

Personal information
- Born: Jane Maxwell; 8 July 1928 Kaikohe, New Zealand
- Died: 21 July 2023 (aged 95) Auckland, New Zealand
- Relatives: Henry Maxwell (brother); Lindsay Tait (grandson)

Sport
- Country: New Zealand
- Sport: Basketball; Softball; Field hockey

Jane Tehira ONZM (née Maxwell; 8 July 1928 – 21 July 2023) was a New Zealand sportsperson who represented her country in basketball, softball and hockey.

== Biography ==
Jane Maxwell was born in Kaikohe on 8 July 1928.

In the 2022 New Year Honours, Tehira was appointed an Officer of the New Zealand Order of Merit, for services to sports.

Tehira died on 21 July 2023, at the age of 95.
