= Leroy W. Stutz =

U.S. Air Force officer (1939–2023)

Colonel Leroy W. Stutz
- Born: November 13, 1939; Effingham, Kansas, U.S.
- Died: July 9, 2023 (aged 83) Oklahoma City, Oklahoma, U.S.
- Allegiance: United States of America
- Branch: United States Air Force
- Service years: 1964–1994
- Rank: Colonel
- Awards: Pilot Wings; Silver Star w/ one Oak Leaf Cluster; Legion of Merit w/ one Oak Leaf Cluster; Distinguished Flying Cross; Bronze Star w/ V for Valor and One Oak Leaf Cluster; Prisoner of War Medal

Colonel Leroy W. Stutz (November 13, 1939 – July 9, 2023) was a U.S. Air Force officer, pilot and prisoner of war for 2,284 days (6.25 years) during the Vietnam War.

== Early life and education ==
Stutz grew up on farm in northeast Kansas. His sisters were Helen S. Caplinger and Jeanette Mae Berry. He graduated from Atchison County Community High School, where he was an accomplished athlete. Following high school, he farmed with his brother-in-law for two years and joined the Kansas National Guard in 1957. Stutz attended Washburn University for the 1959–1960 academic year. While a student at Washburn, Stutz was initiated into the Kansas Beta Chapter of Phi Delta Theta.

Stutz subsequently received an appointment to the U.S. Air Force Academy graduating in 1964. Prior to entering the service, Stutz was a Master Mason. Following his return from Vietnam he completed the Scottish Rite degrees.

Soon after graduation from the Air Force Academy, Stutz married his high school sweetheart, Karen Keirns. Their son, Brian, was born in 1965. The Stutzs have three grandchildren: Aaron, Austin, and Aimee.

== Vietnam ==
After flight training and reconnaissance photo training in Alabama and South Carolina, Stutz was promoted to first lieutenant and assigned to Udorn, Thailand flying the RF-4C Phantom II.

During a reconnaissance mission in November 1966, Stutz was recognized for his bravery with his first Silver Star. The citation reads:

First Lieutenant Leroy W. Stutz distinguished himself by gallantry in connection with military operations against an opposing armed force near Hanoi, North Vietnam on 23 November 1966. On that date, Lieutenant Stutz, despite extremely hazardous conditions, reconnoitered the Dap Cau Railroad and Highway Bridge near Hanoi. This night, low level mission imposed great demands upon the resources and capabilities of the pilot. Exposing himself for fifty-five minutes over hostile territory in a highly sophisticated and lethal anti-aircraft defense structure, Lieutenant Stutz displayed outstanding determination in successfully obtaining the required intelligence on their assigned target. This intelligence was instrumental in restricting the flow of vital materials transported on the railroad leading from Hanoi to Communist China. By his gallantry and devotion to duty, Lieutenant Stutz has reflected great credit upon himself and the United States Air Force.

Stutz's 85th combat mission came on December 2, 1966. Stutz and his co-pilot, Captain Robert R. Gregory, were assigned a 55-minute photo reconnaissance mission over Hanoi, North Vietnam. During a pass over their target, their aircraft was hit by 57mm AAA ground fire and the two ejected as their aircraft crashed near Yên Bái 25 miles outside of Hanoi. After landing, the two established voice contact with each other, and both were captured.

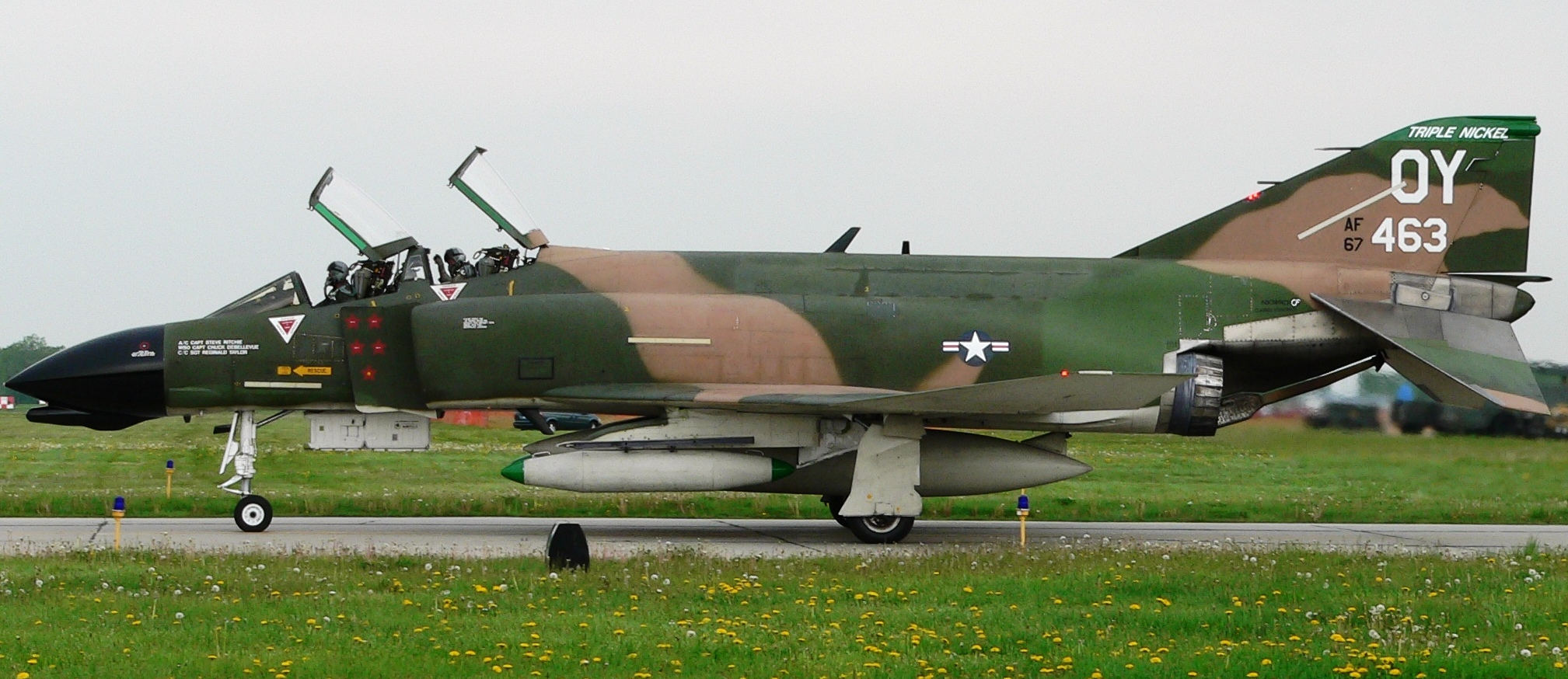
Vietnam era F-4 Phantom II

Stutz reported that he saw Gregory several times the day of their capture, but Gregory was unconscious. Both men were transported to the Hanoi Hilton in the same truck and arrived on the same day they were shot down. Stutz never saw Gregory again. In 1987, Life magazine published a story about Gregory who was still listed as missing in action. Three months later, Vietnamese officials discovered Gregory's remains, returning them to his family 22 years after Stutz's return.

In an interview in 2004, Stutz described what happened upon his capture. After being stripped of his clothes and having his arms tied behind him, they "beat hell" out of him. "They took me to three or four villages to let everyone see the 'American aggressor,'" he recalled, adding villagers were encouraged to strike him too. "It was organized mayhem."

Stutz was routinely beaten, tortured and starved during the first four years of captivity. He was moved around to several POW camps in the north including New Guy Village, the Zoo, Little Las Vegas, the Power Plant, Heartbreak Hotel, Camp Hope (Son Tay) and Skidrow. Army Special Forces raided Son Tay in Operation Ivory Coast a rescue attempt but Stutz and his fellow POWs had been moved shortly before the raid.

During his first time at the infamous Hanoi Hilton, an old French prison in downtown Hanoi, the North Vietnamese crowded 40 or 50 into each large cell. Stutz reported in 2004 that "We might have overstepped our bounds because they decided to 're-educate' 36 of us. We were sent to a camp called Skid Row — solitary confinement, hotter than hell, no exercise," he said. "From Skid Row, they brought me and some other guys back and put us in an eight-man cellblock called Heartbreak Hotel."

About one year before their eventual release, the North Vietnamese took Stutz and 214 other prisoners to a camp on the Chinese border. They remained there until the peace agreement was signed.

In the documentary Return with Honor, Stutz describes how his North Vietnamese captors tortured him:

I thought I was the toughest fighter pilot in the world. I found out real fast how wrong I was . . . When the screaming gets so bad they stuff a rag in your mouth so they don't have to hear you, all you can think is, 'God, I don't want to die and nobody even knowing.'

On March 4, 1973, Stutz, promoted during his time as a prisoner to captain, was released from Hanoi. Almost 600 Americans were freed during Operation Homecoming. The years of deprivation and captivity took a toll on Stutz, who lost 68 pounds (31 kg), dropping from 175 to 107 pounds (79 to 49 kg). An injury suffered when he "tried to break the butt of a rifle with my head" had grounded him medically, when he was finally freed.

== Air Force career ==
Promoted to major in 1974, Stutz was an Air Officer Commanding at the Air Force Academy and then the Commandant's Executive for Honor and Ethics. He next attended the Command and Staff College at Maxwell Air Force Base in 1977–1978. Promoted to lieutenant colonel in 1978, he attended Maintenance Officers School at Chanute Air Force Base. He was then assigned to MacDill Air Force Base as officer in charge of the 61st Aircraft Maintenance Unit, maintenance supervisor, and later commander of the 56th Aircraft Generation Squadron and assistant deputy commander for maintenance.

Promoted to colonel in 1984, Stutz then attended the Air War College at Maxwell Air Force Base in 1984–1985. He returned to MacDill as Deputy Commander for Maintenance for the 56th Tactical Training Wing. He was next Deputy for Maintenance of the 552nd Airborne Warning and Control Wing at Tinker Air Force Base, Oklahoma.

In July 1990, he reported to Chanute Air Force Base, Illinois, where he became the vice wing commander and the chief of the operation division of the 3330th Technical Training Wing. He was put in command of the 3360th in February 1992, and appointed commander of the Training Wing in November 1992.

Colonel Stutz retired from the Air Force in June 1994, having completed 30 years on active duty. At the time of his retirement, he was a rated A pilot, with over 750 flying hours in the T-37 Tweet, T-33, and RF-4C Phantom II.

== Death ==
Stutz died in Oklahoma City on July 9, 2023, at the age of 83. He was buried at Pardee Cemetery.
