= Choi Bong-hong =

South Korean trade unionist and politician (1942–2023)

Member of the National Assembly of South Korea
- In office 30 May 2012 – 29 May 2016

Personal details
- Born: 28 November 1942
- Died: 2 July 2023 (aged 80)
- Party: Saenuri
- Occupation: Trade unionist

Choi Bong-hong (Korean: 최봉홍; 29 November 1942 – 2 July 2023) was a South Korean trade unionist and politician. A member of the Saenuri Party, he served in the National Assembly from 2012 to 2016.

Choi died on 2 July 2023, at the age of 80.
