= Gerd Jüttemann =

German psychologist (1933–2023)

Gerd Jüttemann (7 December 1933 – 28 July 2023) was a German psychologist. He was the originator of the "Komparative Kasuistik" (Comparative Casuistics), a method widely applied in qualitative psychological research and in other social sciences within Europe.

== Life ==
Gerd Jüttemann studied psychology at the universities in Cologne, Bonn, Innsbruck and Kiel. In 1974 he was appointed professor at Technische Universität Berlin, where he taught the disciplines personality psychology, clinical psychology, psychodiagnostics and methodology.

Jüttemann died on 28 July 2023, at the age of 89.

== Scientific work ==
Jüttemann focuses on biographical research (especially the self determined development of personality, what he calls "autogeny"), historical psychology, personality psychology and qualitative methods (Comparative Casuistics). He is coeditor of the journals "Journal für Psychologie" and "Psychologie und Geschichte" (Psychology and History) as well as of the book series "Philosophie und Psychologie im Dialog" (Philosophy and Psychology in Dialog, published by Vandenhoeck & Ruprecht) und "Psychologie und Beruf" (Psychology and Career, Vandenhoeck & Ruprecht).

== Journal article ==
- Komparative Kasuistik als Strategie Psychologischer Forschung. Zeitschrift für Klinische Psychologie und Psychotherapie 29, 1981, S. 101–118. (Foundation of his "Comparative Casuistics").

== Books ==
- Individuelle und soziale Regeln des Handelns. Gerd Jüttemann (Hrsg.). 1991. Asanger-Verlag Kröning. ISBN 3-89334-192-7
- Individuum und Geschichte. M. Sonntag, G. Jüttemann (Hrsg.). 1993. Asanger-Verlag Kröning. ISBN 3-89334-223-0
- Persönlichkeitspsychologie. Gerd Jüttemann. 1995. Asanger-Verlag Kröning. ISBN 3-89334-273-7
