= Ali Ben Salem =

Tunisian human rights activist (1931–2023)

Ali Ben Salem (Arabic: علي بن سالم) or Ali Kchouk (1931 – 27 July 2023) was a Tunisian human rights activist and anti-colonialist, born in Bizerte. He was an opponent of the regimes of Presidents Habib Bourguiba and Zine el-Abidine Ben Ali. Ali Ben Salem was considered the oldest human rights activist in Tunisia. While he was the president of the Bizertine section of the Tunisian Human Rights League, he co-founded the National Council for Freedoms and the Association against Torture in Tunisia.

== Combat against French colonization ==
In 1938, Ali Ben Salem was only seven years old when he lost his father, shot dead by the police during a nationalist demonstration. This gave him a feeling of injustice towards French colonization. His military service during the Indochina War gave him an opportunity to get familiar with the use of arms.

Ali Ben Salem joined the maquis during the Tunisian armed uprising (1952–1954). He took part in the robbery of the Bizerte central post office and the derailment of a train In 1954. He was arrested and sentenced to death by a French military tribunal but escaped his sentence.

== Opposition to Bourguiba ==
In 1955, after the start of internal autonomy, the Yousséfiste split turned into a civil war between the supporters of Habib Bourguiba and those of his rival Salah Ben Youssef. Ben Salem did not choose either side, which is why he was hunted down by both belligerents. He then went into hiding and lived in exile in Libya.

In July 1961, and in the preparations for the Bizerte crisis, he saw the need to come out of hiding. He took an active part in the battle alongside the Neo-Destour volunteers and the young Tunisian Armed Forces. The ill-prepared battle, however, fell into disorder and Ben Salem suffered two injuries on the neck and the back.

In 1977, together with Saâdeddine Zmerli and Mustapha Ben Jafar, he founded the Tunisian Human Rights League, LTDH. Before his death, he was campaigning for the release of political prisoners who oppose the Bourguiba regime.

== Opposition to Ben Ali ==
Within the LTDH, Ali Ben Salem openly criticized the regime of Zine el-Abidine Ben Ali especially during the campaign for the arrested supporters of the Ennahda Movement in 1991. He fought for the release of political prisoners. Above all, in 1998, Ben Salem and several other human rights activists struggled for the respect of human rights in Tunisia. He participated in the founding of the National Council for Liberties in Tunisia. He also founded the Anti-Torture Association in Tunisia.

== After the Revolution ==
After the Revolution of 2011, Ali Ben Salem, the honorary president of the LTDH, became a symbol of the struggle against the dictatorship. He was chosen to be part of the Higher Authority for Realisation of the Objectives of the Revolution, Political Reform and Democratic Transition.

On 14 December 2011, the day after he became the president of the Republic, Moncef Marzouki, visited the city of Bizerte. Marzouki presented him with the Grand Cordon of the Order of Independence on 20 March 2012. On 23 October, he was appointed to be part of the Higher Committee human rights and fundamental freedoms for a period of three years.

In the 2014 Tunisian parliamentary election he was elected to the Assembly of the Representatives of the People. He chaired the opening session of the assembly before the election of Mohamed Ennaceur.

Ali Ben Salem died on 27 July 2023, at the age of 91.
