= Kestel Dam =

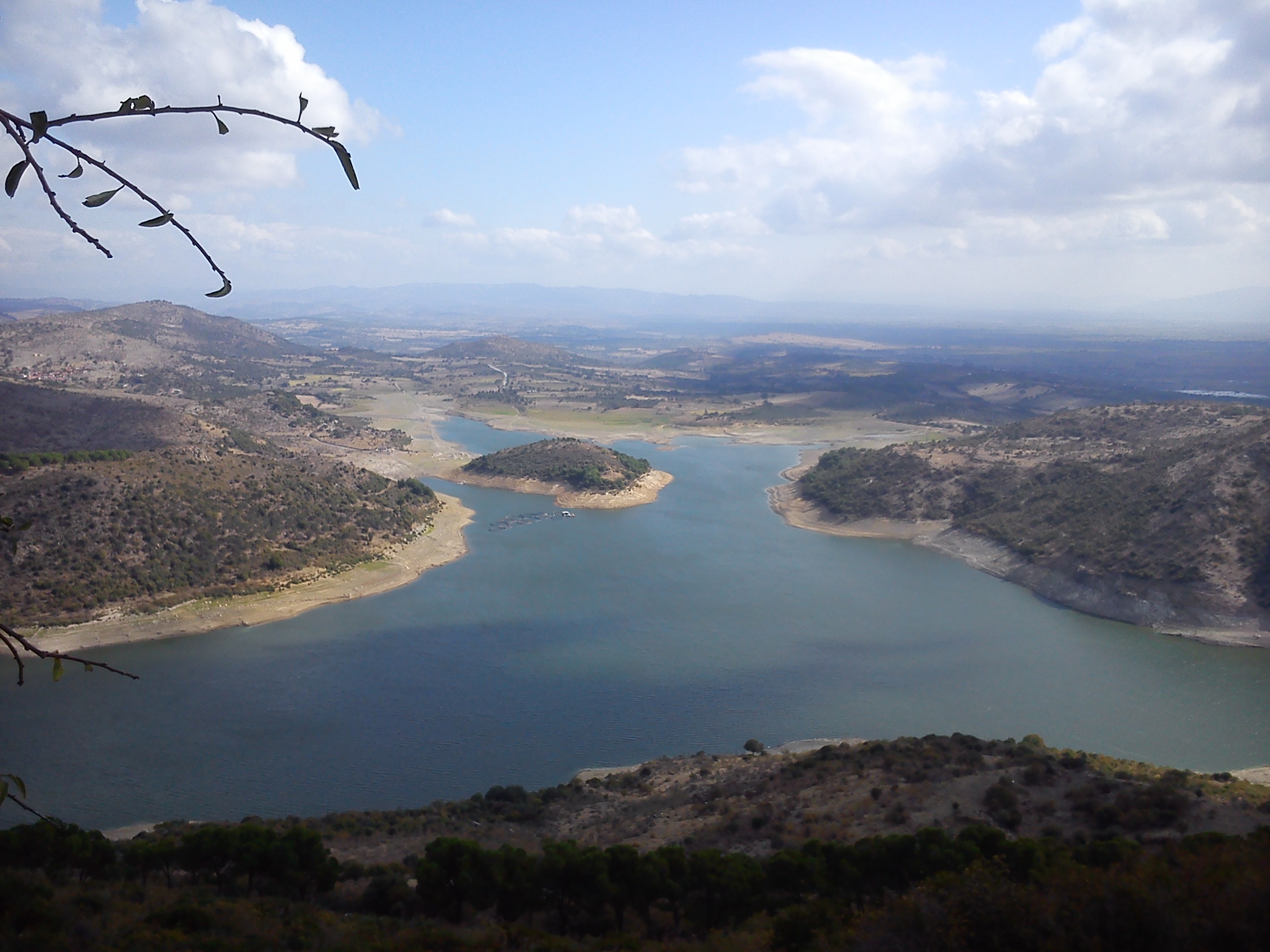
- Kestel Dam
- Location: Turkey
- Coordinates: 39.1322°N 27.1908°E
- Construction began: 1983
- Opening date: 1988

Kestel Dam is a dam in İzmir Province, Turkey, built between 1983 and 1988, and is still in use. The development was backed by the Turkish State Hydraulic Works.

== See also ==
- List of dams and reservoirs in Turkey
