= Michel Charpentier =

French sculptor and medalist (1927–2023)

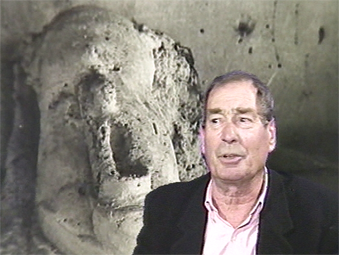
- Charpentier in 1995
- Born: 6 September 1927; Auvers-sur-Oise, France
- Died: 2 July 2023 (aged 95); Cavaillon, France
- Occupations: Sculptor; Medalist

Michel Charpentier (6 September 1927 – 2 July 2023) was a French sculptor and medalist.

== Biography ==
Born in Auvers-sur-Oise on 6 September 1927, Charpentier received the Prix de Rome in 1951 and stayed at the Prix de Rome until 1955. In 1963, he received the Prix Malraux at the Biennale de Paris. In 1965, he exhibited at the Musée d'Art Moderne de Paris and joined the directing group of the Salon de Mai two years later. From 1973 to 1991, he was chair of the sculpting department at the Beaux-Arts de Paris.

Michel Charpentier died on 2 July 2023, at the age of 95.
