= Basil Balme =

Australian palaeontologist (1923–2023)

- Basil Balme in 1988 (aged 65)
- Born: Basil Eric Balme; 13 June 1923; Perth, Australia
- Died: 10 July 2023 (aged 100); Claremont (Perth), Australia
- Education: University of Western Australia
- Spouse: Helen Cook
- Children: 3
- Awards: W.R. Browne Medal of the Geological Society of Australia (1988)
- Scientific career
- Fields: Palynology; Stratigraphy; Historical geology
- Thesis: Studies in stratigraphic palynology (1968)
- Doctoral advisor: R.G. Coleman (unofficially)

Basil Eric Balme (13 June 1923 – 10 July 2023) was an Australian palynologist, considered as one of the pioneers in the field of palynology in Australia as well as one of its greatest contributors.

== Early life ==
Basil Eric Balme was born on 13 June 1923, in Perth, Western Australia. His educational foundation was laid at Scotch College, where he distinguished himself as a Coombe Scholar and recipient of a Council Scholarship. Balme entered the University of Western Australia in 1941, majoring in Geology.

== Military career ==
Balme completed the first year of the geology course before enlisting in the Royal Australian Navy in 1942 during World War II at the age of 19. Balme was involved in convoy duties, escorting other ships throughout the Mediterranean and England. He was originally trained as a radar operator in Melbourne where he joined the corvette HMAS Cowar, and later spent years at sea on English cruisers or corvettes. Balme would also converse and be for several months in the company of Philip Mountbatten, future Prince Philip, Duke of Edinburugh. Balme also served in the southern and western Pacific until 1946, where he was involved in the sinking of a Japanese submarine. By the end of the war Balme had attained the rank of Petty Officer.

== Academic career ==
Returning to university in 1946 at age 23, Balme resumed his studies and graduated with First Class Honours in Geology in 1948. During his undergraduate years, he garnered several academic distinctions, including the Lady James Prize in Natural Science and the E.S. Simpson Prize in Mineralogy. Not only a dedicated scholar, Balme was also a prominent sportsman, representing the university in cricket and Australian Rules football. He was also involved in university governance as a Council Member of the Guild of Undergraduates.

Balme's foray into palynology commenced during his B.Sc. Honours year with a groundbreaking study of Permian miospores in the Collie Coalfield, near Bunbury, Western Australia. In 1949, Balme was presented with an opportunity to pursue a PhD degree at the University of Nottingham, but this plan shifted when his potential supervisor accepted a position elsewhere. Nevertheless, he ventured to England and secured a position at the National Coal Board’s Coal Survey Laboratories in Sheffield. Collaborating with Mavis Butterworth, Balme contributed to palynological studies of British Carboniferous coals.

Returning to Australia in 1952, Balme joined CSIRO as a Research Officer in the Coal Research Section, where he conducted research in both coal petrology and palynology. During this time, he and John Hennelly published a triad of papers which laid the foundations of Permian spore-pollen systematics in Australia. His 1957 monograph on Mesozoic spores and pollen of Western Australia further solidified his reputation in the field.

In 1957, at age 34, Balme transitioned to academia after accepting a Lectureship in Geology at the University of Western Australia. His impactful palynological research continued, focusing on the Upper Palaeozoic-Mesozoic stratigraphy, including floral reconstructions. His extensive collaboration with the petroleum exploration industry significantly shaped his career, as Balme's age determinations through palynomorphs were crucial for stratigraphic correlations and to find more oil deposits.

In 1968 Balme received a higher doctorate (D.Sc.) from the University of Western Australia, and was promoted to Reader in Geology in 1969. His contributions extended beyond research, as he served in various administrative roles at the university, such as Faculty of Science Dean and Department Head. Additionally, he demonstrated a commitment to the geological community by presiding over organizations like the Geological Society of Australia and the Royal Society of Western Australia.

== Personal life ==
Balme's aptitude with language was evident in conversations, letters, and scholarly writings. He was involved in university theatre, playing roles in plays like Capek's The Insect Play and Shaw's St. Joan, which showcased his diverse interests.

Balme married his partner Helen Cook in 1949, who worked at the Natural History Museum of London. After returning from the UK, the couple went to have three children, Stephen, Jane, and Mary. Balme's partner Helen died in 2008 after 59 years of marriage.

Balme died on 10 July 2023, in Perth at age 100.
