= Larysa Marshalava =

Belarusian actress (1978–2023)

- Ларыса Маршалава (be); Лариса Маршалова (ru)
- Born: Larisa Vladimirovna Marshalova; 22 August 1978; Minsk, Byelorussian SSR, USSR
- Died: 12 July 2023 (aged 44); Minsk, Belarus
- Citizenship: Belarus
- Occupation: Actress
- Years active: 2000–2023

Larysa Uladzimirauna Marshalava (Belarusian: Ларыса Уладзіміраўна Маршалава; Russian: Лариса Владимировна Маршалова, Larisa Vladimirovna Marshalova; 22 August 1978 – 12 July 2023) was a Belarusian stage, film, and television actress.

== Biography ==
Larisa Marshalova was born into a family of military officers.

Marshalova debuted in film in 2000, and has had over 60 roles in Belarusian and Russian productions, including TV series Kamenskaya starring Elena Yakovleva. She worked in Theatre-studio of film actor for Belarusfilm for more than twenty years, starting from 2001, and was a leading actress there. She had roles in such plays as Anna Snegina.

Marshalova died on 12 July 2023, at the age of 44. The funerals were scheduled for 14 July. At the time of her death, she had roles in 14 plays in the theatre, including four starring roles.
