= Justyn Vicky =

American-born Indonesian bodybuilder and influencer (1990–2023)

- Born: Herman Fausi; 7 March 1990; New York City, U.S.
- Died: 17 July 2023 (aged 33); Denpasar, Bali, Indonesia
- Occupations: Bodybuilder; athlete; influencer
- Years active: 2011–2023
- Children: 1

Justyn Vicky (born Herman Fausi; 7 March 1990 – 17 July 2023) was an American-born Indonesian bodybuilder, athlete, and influencer.

== Early life ==
Justyn Vicky was born Herman Fausi on 7 March 1990 in New York City, as the eldest of his parents’, Hermanto and Busia, two children. He was raised and resided in Klungkung Regency, Bali.

== Personal life ==
Vicky had a son, Jazztian Vicky Hermansyah, from a marriage.

== Career ==
Vicky started his career as a bodybuilder at The Paradise Bali gym in Sanur, Denpasar. He won the Ultimate Body Contest in 2011 and began sharing educational content about fitness on his social media. In his training, he frequently performed back squats with weights starting at 170 kg, and increasing to 190 kg, and later 200 kg. Vicky provided his audience with educational content regarding various exercises, particularly back squats, one of the most dangerous exercises according to him. Vicky won the Mr. Bali Competition in 2015 and 2016. In 2018, he won first place at the Muscle Beach Bali competition, followed by a third place win in the same competition in 2019. He won the International Fitness and Bodybuilding Federation competition in 2018.

== Death ==
On July 15, 2023, Vicky suffered an accident when lifting a barbell weighing 210 kilograms (460 lb). During this exercise, he was assisted by a partner who held the barbell from behind. Initially, the large barbell was lifted from a standing position into a squat. However, a fatigued Vicky began to struggle, and despite the best efforts of his spotter, caused the barbell to press on the back of his neck and shoulders, causing him to fall unconscious with a broken neck. The accident left him with critical pressures on vital nerves that connected to his heart and lungs. He was rushed to Siloam Hospitals and was referred to Wangaya Regional General Hospital in Denpasar, Bali, to undergo surgery on 16 July. He contacted his mother via video call who later came to visit him along with his son and ex-wife. After he underwent surgery, he slipped into a coma and died a day later at the age of 33, and was buried at a family plot in his parents' hometown of Jember, East Java. The video of his accident was circulated on social media.

The Paradise Bali gym where he died offered their condolences on his death via Instagram, saying that his infectious energy and genuine passion to help others change their lives deeply touched them. Vicky's friend, Kang Gede, paid tribute to him in a conversation with Bali Express, calling him a good, polite, and sociable person. His physician, I Ketut Suryana, noted Vicky's cause of death being due to a broken neck which damaged vital nerves.
