= Wendy Brewster =

American professor of obstetrics and gynaecology (1966–2023)

- Born: Wendy Rosamond Brewster; May 24, 1966; Newcastle upon Tyne, England
- Died: July 24, 2023 (aged 57); Bellaire, Texas, U.S.
- Education: Rutgers University; University of California, Los Angeles (MD); University of California, Irvine (PhD)
- Scientific career
- Fields: Obstetrics; Gynaecology
- Workplaces: University of North Carolina at Chapel Hill; University of California, Irvine
- Thesis: Multiple primary malignancies: an examination of factors that influence the risk of ovarian cancer subsequent to breast cancer (2000)
- Website: www.med.unc.edu/cwhr/directory/wendy-brewster-md-phd

Wendy Rosamund Brewster (May 24, 1966 – July 24, 2023) was a British-born American gynaecologist who was Professor of Obstetrics and Gynaecology and Director of the Center for Women's Health Research at the University of North Carolina at Chapel Hill.

== Early life and education ==
Wendy Rosamund Brewster was born in Newcastle upon Tyne, England on May 24, 1966. She was raised in Guyana. She realised at the age of six that she wanted to be a physician. She studied mathematics and Spanish at Rutgers University. Brewster studied medicine at the University of California, Los Angeles. She specialised in gynaecological surgery and oncology. Brewster was a medical fellow at the University of California, Irvine, where she worked in gynaecologic oncology. During the first year of her fellowship she studied indicators in breast cancer survivors who go on to develop a second primary cancer. Here she worked on improving cancer care, research which contributed to her doctorate in epidemiology in 2000.

== Research and career ==
Brewster started her independent scientific career at University of California, Irvine (UCI), where she studied populations who were at risk for inadequate cancer treatments and outcomes. She looked at how the standard of medical care impacted the outcomes of people with cervical cancer, and demonstrated that cervical dysplasia can be treated with a single visit, overcoming risks of treating high risk populations. Brewster led a National Cancer Institute trial that invited women on low incomes into hospital for a cervical cancer screening, which improved their treatment and follow up rates. In 2007 she was made Director of the Oncology Fellowship programme at UCI.

In 2008, Brewster joined the University of North Carolina at Chapel Hill, where she was made Director for the Center for Women's Health Research. She identified bacteria in women's ovaries and fallopian tubes, part of the reproductive tract that was previously understood to be sterile. Brewster also showed that women with ovarian cancer have different bacterial populations to those without cancer, indicating that these bacterial populations may impact cancer progression. She was Chair of the Cancer Prevention and Control Committee.

Brewster was the co-director for the Lineberger Comprehensive Cancer Center Equity Council which she helped to initiate in 2020. In this role, she worked on approaches to improve health equity, enhance clinical trial accrual for patients from underrepresented groups and enhance the diversity of the faculty and staff in the Cancer Center.

== Death ==
Wendy Brewster died of pancreatic cancer in Bellaire, Texas, on July 24, 2023, at the age of 57.

== Selected publications ==
- Association between endometriosis and risk of histological subtypes of ovarian cancer: a pooled analysis of case–control studies
- A genome-wide association study identifies susceptibility loci for ovarian cancer at 2q31 and 8q24
- Diabetic neuropathy, nerve growth factor and other neurotrophic factors
