= Jacob Golomb =

Israeli philosopher (1947–2023)

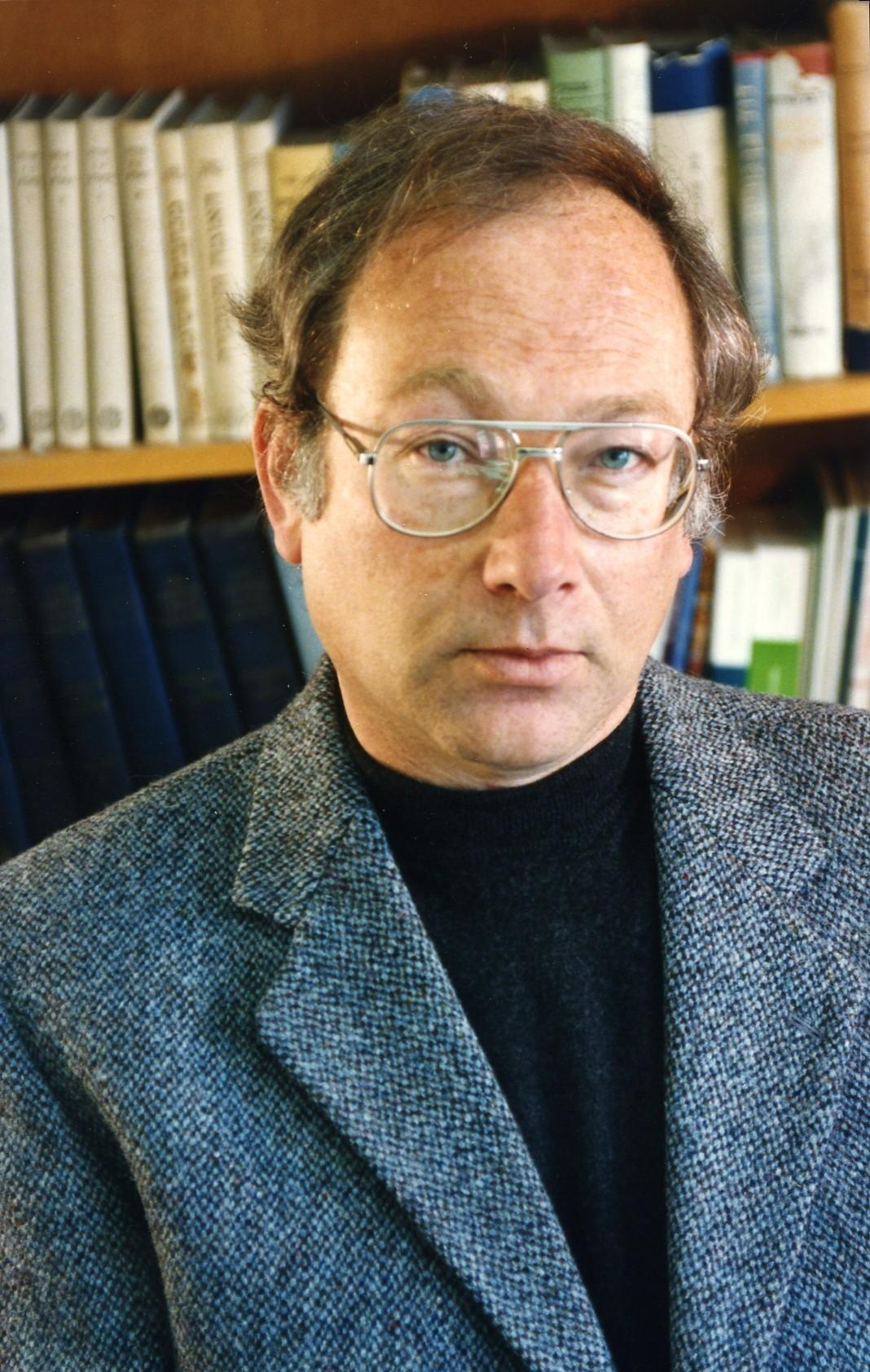
Jacob Golomb

Jacob Golomb (Hebrew: יעקב גולומב; 5 June 1947 – July 2023) was an Israeli philosopher. He was professor of philosophy at The Hebrew University of Jerusalem. He was the philosophical editor of the Magnes Press.

Jacob Golomb died in July 2023, at the age of 76.
