= Peter Brunt (gastroenterologist) =

Scottish gastroenterologist

Peter William Brunt was a Scottish gastroenterologist and Physician to the Queen.

== Biography ==
Brunt was born on 18 January 1936 in Prestatyn, Wales to Florence and Harry Brunt. He was educated at Manchester Grammar School, Cheadle Hulme School, and King George V School in Southport. Later, he attended Liverpool University, where he graduated in 1959.

Brunt's early career included various medical positions in Liverpool, followed by a research fellowship in Baltimore. In 1961, he married Anne Lewis, a doctor.

In 1996, Brunt was ordained as a non-stipendiary minister in the Scottish Episcopal Church, becoming a priest the following year. He was an active preacher in Aberdeen and later in Northumberland after relocating there in 2019 following his wife's death.

Brunt's medical career took a significant turn upon his return to the UK in 1967, where he began working in the then-emerging field of gastroenterology. His roles included a lectureship at the University of Edinburgh and a senior registrar position at Western General Hospital. His expertise in liver disease was further developed at the Royal Free Hospital in London.

In 1970, Brunt was appointed as a consultant physician in Aberdeen, where he established a gastroenterology unit specializing in liver disease and providing care to patients from the Shetland Islands. The unit later came to be known as the Peter Brunt Centre at Aberdeen Royal Infirmary.

Notably, Brunt was an early adopter of video endoscopy in clinical practice. His other contributions included the development of a research database for inflammatory bowel disease and the establishment of a gastrointestinal bleeding unit.

In 1983, Brunt was appointed Physician to the Queen in Scotland, and in 1994, he was awarded an OBE for his services to medicine. The University of Aberdeen recognized his contributions with a personal chair in medicine in 1996. Upon retiring in 2001, he was made a Commander of the Royal Victorian Order.

Brunt also worked with Alcohol Focus Scotland, Alcohol and Drugs Action, and the Medical Council on Alcohol. He was a member of the Royal College of Physicians of Edinburgh (RCPE), a former president of the Association of Physicians of Great Britain and Ireland, and served on various medical advisory bodies.
