= SunRay Kelley =

American builder (1951–2023)

Raymond E. Kelley (December 1, 1951 – July 16, 2023), usually known as SunRay Kelley, was an American builder known for his fanciful structural designs. His approximately 70 structures featured unusual designs such as turrets, peaked and curved roofs (sometimes with living plants growing on top), and the use of raw natural materials such as tree branches. He was also known for his creation of low-cost yurt-like buildings. Kelley was born in 1951 in Sedro-Woolley, Washington, and died there on July 16, 2023, at the age of 71.
