= Isao Kuwabara =

Japanese politician (1945–2023)

- 桑原 功

Member of the House of Representatives
- In office 30 August 2009 – 16 November 2012
- Constituency: Northern Kanto PR

Member of the Gunma Prefectural Assembly
- In office 2003–2007
- Constituency: Maebashi City

Member of the Maebashi City Council
- In office 1985–2001

Personal details
- Born: 4 February 1945 Maebashi, Gunma, Japan
- Died: 10 July 2023 (aged 78) Maebashi, Gunma, Japan
- Party: Democratic
- Education: Chuo University

Isao Kuwabara (Japanese: 桑原功 Kuwabara Isao; 4 February 1945 – 10 July 2023) was a Japanese politician. A member of the Democratic Party of Japan, he served in the House of Representatives from 2009 to 2012.

Kuwabara died of liver cancer in Maebashi on 10 July 2023, at the age of 78.
