= Joan Freeman (British psychologist) =

British psychologist (1935–2023)

Joan Freeman (born Sally Joan Casket, 1935 – 2 July 2023) was a British child psychologist who is known for her work in the lifetime development of gifts and talents.

== Education and academia ==
Freeman earned her BSc in psychology at Manchester University, followed by an advanced diploma in school counselling, an MEd in education and a PhD in educational psychology.

Freeman then taught at Preston Polytechnic / Lancaster University, where she was a senior lecturer. She then became a research associate at Manchester University and later, lecturer at the UCL Institute of Education.

In 2006 the College of Teachers, of which she was senior vice-president, awarded her an Honorary Fellowship. In 2014, Mensa International awarded her a Lifetime Achievement Award, she was also awarded the First European Talent Networking Award, for the promotion of Europe-wide co-operation in support of young talented people. She was made an Honorary Patron of the National Association for Able Children in Education (NACE) in 2006.

She has an elected fellowship with the British Psychological Society, where she has been honoured with a Lifetime Achievement Award in 2007, she is also a Chartered (Licensed) Psychologist.

== Topics of research ==
Freeman's ongoing aim is to inspire a scientific approach to the study and development of high-level potential, and to develop a dynamic communications network of knowledge and practice around the world.

=== Child development ===
Freeman's most significant research contribution to the field of child development has been her unique 35-year in-depth UK comparative study of 210 gifted and non-gifted children as they grew to adulthood. This was funded by the Gulbenkian Foundation and the Esmee Fairbairn Foundation.

This groundbreaking research showing the lives of the gifted and talented as normal people with special challenges helped to make positive changes in attitudes to the development of high level potential all over the world. The research was noted for its depth of investigation and scientific set-up, notably with double matched control groups.

=== UK Government work ===
Freeman was an advisor on the education of the gifted and talented for about eight years for the UK government and primary witness to the Standing Committee on the education of Highly Able Children. She founded and was President of the Tower Education Group, a think tank of UK experts which reported to the Education Development Trust.

== The European Council for High Ability ==
In 1988 Freeman established the European Council for High Ability, bringing cooperation across the West and the Soviet zone. It became a Council of Europe Non-governmental organisation and is now a flourishing worldwide organisation of which she remains founding president and honorary member. It publishes the academic journal High Ability Studies, Taylor and Francis, of which she was editor-in-chief; she is now on their international advisory board. This publication is included in the Social Sciences Citation Index.

== Later activities ==
Freeman was later a visiting professor at Middlesex University, London and an executive of the European Council for High Ability's European talent support system. She was also a patron of the National Association for Able Children in Education.

From 2007, Freeman ran a private practice in central London for children with gifted potential. At the time it was the only psychology practice in the UK dedicated to this area of child development and attracted parents and children from around the world.

== Outside psychology ==
Freeman was a long-serving member of the North West Arts Association in many capacities, including chair of the journal; a director of the Palace Theatre, Manchester; instigator and judge of the Cadbury's National Children's Poetry Exhibition and editorial advisor for its five books of children's poetry published by Arrow Books.

== Death ==
Freeman died on 2 July 2023, at the age of 88.

== Selected publications and interviews ==
=== Books ===
Freeman published 17 books for scholars and parents, including:

- Human Biology and Hygiene – an O-level science text. Pergamon. 1968. p. 273. ISBN 978-0-0-80-03537-6.
- In and Out of School. Methuen. 1975. p. 144. ISBN 978-0-4-16-83750-6.
- The Psychology of Gifted Children: Perspectives on Development and Education. Wiley. 26 August 1985. pp. 414. ISBN 978-0-4-71-10255-7.
- Educating the Very Able. HMSO. 1988. p. 67. ISBN 978-0-1-13-50100-7.
- Gifted Children Growing Up. Cassell. 1991. p. 243. ISBN 978-0-3-04-32408-8.
- Quality Basic Education: The development of competence. UNESCO. 1992. p. 256. ISBN 978-9-2-31-02788-8.
- How to Raise a Bright Child. Vermilion. 6 August 1996. p. 190. ISBN 978-0-0-91-81391-8.
- Bright as a Button: How to encourage your children's talents 0-5 years. Optima. 1996. p. 182. ISBN 978-0-3-56-19671-8.
- Gifted Lives: What happens when gifted children grow up. Routledge. 15 September 2010. p. 312. ISBN 978-0-4-15-47009-4.

=== Selected papers ===
- 'Scientific thinking in gifted children' in P. Csermely & L. Lederman (Eds.) Science Education: Talent Recruitment and Public Understanding’ IOS Press with NATO Scientific Affairs Division: Amsterdam
- 'Permission to be gifted: how perceptions of giftedness can change lives’, in R. Sternberg & J. Davidson, Conceptions of Giftedness, Cambridge: Cambridge University Press. Pp. 80–97.
- Intelligenz, Hochbegabung, Vorschulerziehung, Bildungsbenachteiligung. Published 2010 – in German
- Education of Gifted Children in Western Europe Publisher: Moscow State University of Psychology and Education. Published 2011 in Russian. ISSN 1814-2052
- Emotional Development of the Gifted and Talented. Published 2013 in Czech
- 'The long-term effects of families and educational provision on gifted children', Educational and Child Psychology, 30 (2), 7–17. Published 2013
- Why some gifted children are notably more successful in life than others with equal ability and opportunities. Published in Spanish, Revista de Educación. April–June 2015

=== Selected interviews ===
- Young Gifted and Likely to Suffer for It The Guardian 9 October 2010
- Gifted lives: An Interview with Professor Joan Freeman Horizons of Psychology 2011
- Child Genius
- How do I know if my child is gifted or just smart?

=== Citations ===
Freeman's books and papers have accumulated hundreds of citations.
