= Richard O. Simpson =

American businessman (died 2023)

Richard Olin Simpson (March 7, 1930 – July 21, 2023) was an American businessman. He was the first chairman of the U.S. Consumer Product Safety Commission. He died on July 21, 2023, at the age of 93.
