= Paul Kestel =

German politician (1931–2023)

Member of the Landtag of Bavaria
- In office 22 October 1986 – 23 October 1990

Personal details
- Born: 8 November 1931 Amberg, Bavaria, Germany
- Died: 9 July 2023 (aged 91)
- Party: Alliance 90/The Greens
- Education: LMU Munich
- Occupation: Schoolteacher

Paul Kestel (8 November 1931 – 9 July 2023) was a German schoolteacher and politician. A member of Alliance 90/The Greens, he served in the Landtag of Bavaria from 1986 to 1990.

Kestel died on 9 July 2023, at the age of 91.
