= William Gackle =

American politician (1927-2023)

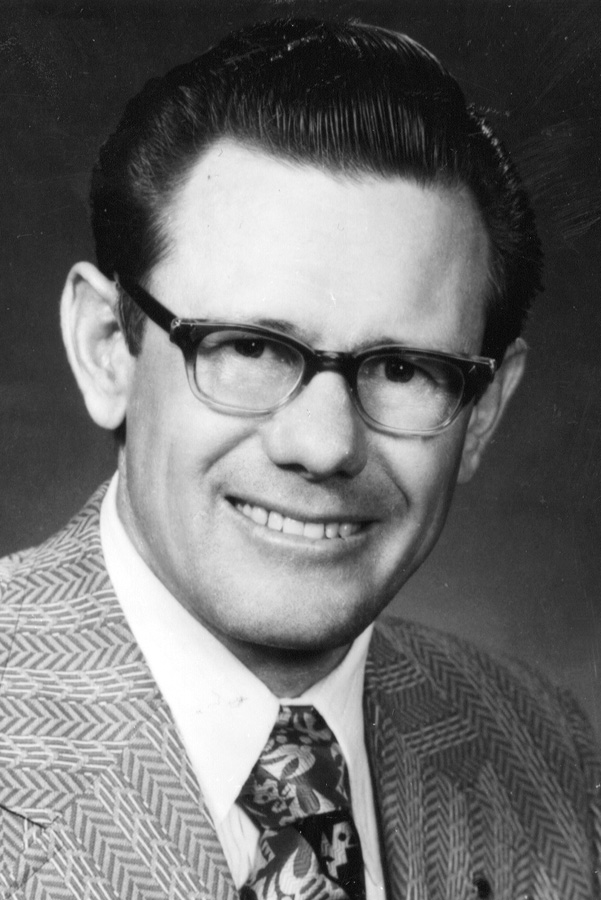

Member of the North Dakota House of Representatives from the 24th district
- In office 1963–1964
- Preceded by: Fred E. Rickford
- Succeeded by: Vernon Krenze
- In office 1967–1980
- Preceded by: Lawrence Rosendahl
- Succeeded by: Reuben L. Metz

Personal details
- Born: December 7, 1927 Kulm, North Dakota, U.S.
- Died: July 30, 2023 (aged 95) Kulm, North Dakota, U.S.
- Party: Republican
- Spouse: Marilyn Bernice (Goehner) Gackle
- Children: Frederick Gackle, David Gackle, Mary Alice (Gackle) Zenker, Jonathan Gackle
- Profession: Farmer
- Committees: Vice Chairman of the Judiciary Committee, Chairman of the House Finance and Taxation Committee
- Nickname: Tiger Bill

Military service
- Branch/service: United States Army Air Forces
- Years of service: 1945-1949
- Rank: Seargent

William Frederick Gackle (December 7, 1927 – July 30, 2023) was an American politician who was a member of the North Dakota House of Representatives. As a Republican, he represented the 28th district from 1963 to 1964 and from 1967 to 1980. He attended Howard College in San Angelo, Texas and was later a farmer. He died in Kulm, North Dakota on July 30, 2023, at the age of 95.

== Biography ==
William (Bill) Gackle was born to Otto and Alice (Higdem) Gackle in Kulm, North Dakota in 1927. He joined the Kulm City Band in 1942, while still in high school. He graduated from Kulm High School in 1945, at which point he joined the United States Army Air Forces, where he was an aircraft mechanic. Gackle won the military's Light Heavyweight boxing division before being discharged in 1949. After moving home to Kulm and marrying his wife, Marilyn Bernice (Goehner) Gackle on August 20, 1950, Bill spent six years in the North Dakota National Guard. Bill and his wife had four children, Frederick, David, Mary Alice, and Jonathan. Bill passed on in his home on July 30, 2023.

== Community Service ==
Bill devoted his life to community and public service. He joined the Kulm City Band in 1942 and played for 80 years. He chaired the 75th Kulm Anniversary committee and the Kulm Centennial committee, served as President and Director of the LaMoure County Farm Bureau, and chaired the committee to fundraise for the Kulm Community Center. Bill was a charter member of Kulm First Inc, a corporation formed to keep local businesses, like the grocery store, operating. He founded and served on the Kulm Community Development Corporation, a nonprofit community development group.
