= Amos Badertscher =

American photographer (1936–2023)

Amos Badertscher (October 1, 1936 – July 24, 2023) was an American photographer. He was known for his photographs of people who lived alternative lifestyles in the city of Baltimore.
