= Rubén Martínez Bulnes =

Salvadoran architect and sculptor (1929–2023)

Rubén Martínez
- Born: Rubén Martínez Bulnes; 7 July 1929; San Salvador, El Salvador
- Died: 17 July 2023 (aged 94)
- Education: Universidad de El Salvador
- Occupations: Sculptor architect
- Style: Modernism; Abstract art

Rubén Martínez Bulnes (7 July 1929 – 17 July 2023) was a Salvadoran architect and sculptor. He is considered the author of the country's most prolific sculptural art.

== Early life ==
His interest in art began in his infancy. As a young person he wanted to become an architect, but he ended up studying civil engineering like his father. His career as a sculptor began when he collected metallic remains from the place where he studied. He received his first instruction from welders.

== Career ==
The predominant material in his creations are metals and forged iron, which are sculpted in a range of abstract forms. Important pieces of the Salvadoran nation were made by him, among them the Monument of the Constitution (Spanish: Monumento a la Constitución), the Monument of Peace (Spanish: Monumento a la Paz), and the sculptures of José Simeón Cañas, exhibited in the National Museum of art, and José Matías Delgado, located in the parque San José in San Salvador. He worked in gardening, painting, drawing, landscaping, glass work, restoration, and music.

His most important architectural work is the Iglesia El Rosario, located in the Historical Center of San Salvador. The church is in a modernist style with a European influence. Inside are some of his iron sculptures and glass work, as well as a symmetrical form which has no pillars so as to not create obstacles for the altar. Despite criticism for the structure's design, he received support from the Dominicans who were in charge of the church. Other examples of his religious works are the templos del Perpetuo Socorro, la Transfiguración, and San José de la Montaña.

== Death ==
Martínez Bulnes died on 17 July 2023, at the age of 94.

== Recognition ==
In November 2012 he was recognized as Notable sculptor of El Salvador by the Legislative Assembly.

In April 2018 he was named Merited Son of San Salvador (Spanish: Hijo Meritísimo de San Salvador) by the Alcaldía of San Salvador in honor of his work.
