= 2023 in literature =

This article contains information about the literary events and publications of 2023.

== Events ==
c. July 1 – The public library at Borny, Metz, is among public buildings burned in the Nahel Merzouk protests in France.

=== Anniversaries ===
- 100th anniversary of Time
- 100th anniversary of Weird Tales
- 100th anniversary of the publication of
  - Bambi, a Life in the Woods by Felix Salten
  - The Ego and the Id by Sigmund Freud
  - "The Good Soldier Svejk by Jaroslav Hašek (last installment)
  - "The Horror at Martin's Beach" by H. P. Lovecraft
  - "Hypnos" by H. P. Lovecraft
  - "The Lurking Fear" by H. P. Lovecraft
  - "Memory" by H. P. Lovecraft
  - "What the Moon Brings" by H. P. Lovecraft
  - The Prophet by Kahlil Gibran
  - New Hampshire by Robert Frost
    - "Stopping by Woods on a Snowy Evening"
  - Saint Joan by George Bernard Shaw
  - Sonnets to Orpheus by Rainer Maria Rilke
  - Three Stories and Ten Poems by Ernest Hemingway
  - Toward an Architecture by Le Corbusier
  - Antic Hay by Aldous Huxley

== New books ==
Dates after each title indicate U.S. publication, unless otherwise indicated.

=== Fiction ===
New adult fiction, sorted by date of publication
Author	Title	Date of Pub.	Ref.
Allegra Goodman	Sam	January 3	
Bret Easton Ellis	The Shards	January 17	
Martin Riker	The Guest Lecture	January 24	
Annalee Newitz	The Terraformers	January 31	
Salman Rushdie	Victory City	February 7	
Rebecca Makkai	I Have Some Questions for You	February 21	
John Banville	The Lock-Up	April 6	
Dennis Lehane	Small Mercies	April 25	
Emily Henry	Happy Place	April 25	
Abraham Verghese	The Covenant of Water	May 2	
Gina Apostol	La Tercera	May 4	
Naoise Dolan	The Happy Couple	May 25	
Margaret Atwood	Fourteen Days	May 30	
Paul Goldberg	The Dissident	June 6	
S. A. Cosby	All the Sinners Bleed	June 6	
David Connor	Oh God, the Sun Goes	August 1	
Ann Patchett	Tom Lake	August 1	
Mona Susan Power	A Council of Dolls	August 8	
John Manual Arias	Where There Was Fire	August 29	
Zadie Smith	The Fraud	September 5	
Stephen King	Holly	September 5	
Daniel Mason	North Woods	September 19	
Samantha Harvey	Orbital	November 2	
Christine Platt & Catherine Wigginton Greene	Rebecca, Not Becky	December 5	

=== Children and young adults ===
New children's and young adult books, sorted by date of publication
Author	Title	Date of Pub.	Ref.
Marla Frazee	In Every Life	February 7	
Dan Santat	A First Time for Everything	February 28	
Peter Brown	The Wild Robot Escapes	April 7	
Carole Boston Weatherford	How Do You Spell Unfair?	April 11	
Rick Riordan and Mark Oshiro	The Sun and the Star	May 2	
Brandy Colbert	The Eyes and the Impossible	May 29	
Jacqueline Wilson	The Best Sleepover in the World	August 17	
Jason Reynolds	Stuntboy, In-Between Time	August 29	
Chimamanda Ngozi Adichie	Mama's Sleeping Scarf	September 5	
Brandy Colbert	The Blackwoods	October 3	
Jeff Kinney	Diary of a Wimpy Kid: No Brainer	October 24	

=== Nonfiction ===
New nonfiction, sorted by date of publication
Author	Title	Date of pub.	Ref.
Paul Auster	Bloodbath Nation	January 10	
Rick Rubin	The Creative Act	January 17	
David Graeber	Pirate Enlightenment	January 24	
Malcolm Harris	Palo Alto A History of California, Capitalism, and the World	February 14	
Bernie Sanders	It's OK to Be Angry About Capitalism	February 21	
Ron DeSantis	The Courage to Be Free	February 28	
Matthew Desmond	Poverty, by America	March 21	
David Grann	The Wager	April 18	
John Vaillant	Fire Weather: a true story from a hotter world	June 6	
Sarah Ogilvie	The Dictionary People	September 7	
Naomi Klein	Doppelganger	September 12	
Zeke Faux	Number Go Up	September 12	
Scott Shane	Flee North	September 19	
Michael Lewis	Going Infinite	October 3	

=== Biography and memoirs ===
New biographies and memoirs, sorted by date of publication
Author	Title	Date of pub.	Ref.
Prince Harry	Spare	January 10	
Pamela Anderson	Love, Pamela	January 31	
Elliot Page	Pageboy	June 6	
Andrew Leland	The Country of the Blind: A Memoir at the End of Sight	July 18	
Walter Isaacson	Elon Musk	September 12	
Britney Spears	The Woman in Me	October 24	
Aaron Badgley	Dark Horse Records: The Story of George Harrison's Post-Beatles Record Label	December 8	

== Deaths ==
2023 deaths, sorted by date of death
Individual	Background	Date of death	Age	Cause of death	Ref.
January
Lise Nørgaard	Danish journalist and writer (Matador)	January 1	105		
Edith Pearlman	American short story writer	January 1	86		
Suzy McKee Charnas	American novelist (The Kingdom of Kevin Malone, The Holdfast Chronicles) and short story writer ("Boobs")	January 2	83		
Catherine David	French-American literary critic and novelist	January 2	73		
Dumitru Radu Popescu	Romanian novelist and poet	January 2	87		
Mohamed Enani	Egyptian writer and translator	January 3	83		
Fay Weldon	British author (The Life and Loves of a She-Devil, Puffball, The Cloning of Joanna May), essayist and playwright	January 4	91		
Victoria de Stefano	Italo-Venezuelan novelist, essayist and philosopher	January 6	82		
Russell Banks	American novelist (Continental Drift, The Sweet Hereafter, Cloudsplitter)	January 7	82	Cancer	
Aleksey Slapovsky	Russian novelist, playwright and screenwriter (The Irony of Fate 2)	January 8	65	Pneumonia	
Rehman Rahi	Indian poet, translator and literary critic	January 9	97		
Charles Simic	Serbian-born American poet (The World Doesn't End: Prose Poems)	January 9	84	Complications from dementia	
Sara Aboobacker	Indian novelist, short story writer and translator	January 10	86		
Paul Johnson	British journalist and historian (Modern Times: A History of the World from the 1920s to the 1980s, A History of the American People, A History of Christianity)	January 12	94		
Claudio Willer	Brazilian poet, essayist and translator	January 13	82	Bladder cancer	
Ronald Blythe	English writer and columnist	January 14	100		
Gordana Kuić	Serbian novelist (The Scent of Rain in the Balkans)	January 15	80		
Gáspár Miklós Tamás	Hungarian philosopher and academic	January 15	74		
Mousse Boulanger	Swiss writer and journalist	January 16	96		
Luisa Josefina Hernández	Mexican writer, playwright and translator	January 16	94		
Jonathan Raban	British travel writer, critic, and novelist (Soft City, Waxwings, For Love & Money)	January 17	80		
Jacques Jarry	French linguist and archeologist	January 18			
Claude Guillon	French writer and philosopher	January 19	70		
Nilmani Phookan Jr	Indian poet	January 19	89		
Grigorijus Kanovičius	Lithuanian writer	January 20	93		
Paul LaFarge	American novelist, essayist and academic	January 20	52	Cancer	
Nano Riantiarno	Indonesian playwright	January 20	73		
Georges Banu	Romanian-born French writer	January 21	79		
Pino Roveredo	Italian writer and theater director	January 21	68		
Friedrich Weissensteiner	Austrian historian and writer	January 21	95		
Ian Black	British journalist and author (Israel's Secret Wars)	January 22	69	complications from frontotemporal lobar degeneration	
Joseph Agassi	Israeli philosopher and author (The Continuing Revolution)	January 23	95		
Dmytro Pavlychko	Ukrainian poet, translator and diplomat	January 29	93		
K. V. Tirumalesh	Indian writer and poet	January 30	82		
Linda Pastan	American poet	January 30	90		
Cleonice Berardinelli	Brazilian academic and writer	January 31	106		
Henrik Nordbrandt	Danish poet (Drømmebroer), novelist, and essayist	January 31	77		
February
René Schérer	French philosopher	February 1	100		
Alain Lacouchie	French poet and illustrator	February 3	76		
Knut Borchardt	German historian	February 5	93		
Renato Del Ponte	Italian essayist	February 5	78		
Josep Maria Espinàs	Spanish writer ("Cant del Barça"), journalist and publisher	February 5	95		
May Sayegh	Palestinian poet and political activist	February 5	82		
Răzvan Theodorescu	Romanian historian and politician	February 6	83		
Nicolò Mineo	Italian literary critic, literary historian and philologist	February 6	89		
Richard Kell	Irish poet, composer, and teacher	February 7	95		
Leontii Voitovych	Ukrainian historian	February 7	71		
Subimal Mishra	Indian novelist and short story writer	February 8	79		
Agnès Laroche	French novelist and author	February 11	57		
Lualhati Bautista	Filipino novelist (Dekada '70, 'GAPÔ, Bata, Bata... Pa'no Ka Ginawa?), screenwriter (Bulaklak sa City Jail) and activist	February 12	77		
Robert Sauzet	French historian	February 12	95		
Suzanne Sens	French author and educator	February 13	92		
Giampiero Neri	Italian poet	February 15	95		
Helen Fogwill Porter	Canadian poet, essayist and activist	February 16	92		
Mario Vitti	Italian philologist	February 6	96		
Richard Belzer	American actor, stand-up comedian, and author	February 19	78	Unspecified circulatory and respiratory conditions	
Daniel Roche	French historian	February 19	87		
Michael S. Heiser	American biblical scholar and author	February 20	60	Pancreatic cancer	
Philip Ziegler	British historian and biographer	February 22	93		
Irving Wardle	English theatre critic and playwright	February 23	93		
Mihai Șora	Romanian philosopher, essayist and politician	February 25	106		
Günther von Lojewski	German journalist, television presenter, and author	February 26	87		
Amy Schwartz	American author and illustrator of children's books	February 26	68		
Juan Muñoz Martín	Spanish children's author (El Barco de Vapor)	February 27	93		
Javad Tabatabai	Iranian philosopher and political scientist	February 28	77		
March
Anise Koltz	Luxembourgish author	March 1	94		
Sasthipada Chattopadhyay	Indian novelist (Pandab Goenda)	March 3	81	Stroke	
Christopher Fowler	British science fiction writer	March 3	69	Cancer	
Kenzaburō Ōe	Japanese writer (1994 Nobel laureate in literature)	March 3	88	Natural causes	
Yuri Zhukov	Russian historian	March 3	85		
Judith Heumann	American disability rights activist and author	March 4	75		
Matti Klinge	Finnish historian	March 5	86		
Sylviane Telchid	Guadeloupean writer and translator	March 5	81	Complications from Alzheimer's disease	
Ian Falconer	American author and illustrator of children's books (Olivia)	March 7	63		
Salvador García-Bodaño	Spanish poet	March 7	87		
Jitendra Nath Mohanty	Indian philosopher	March 7	95		
Dhiruben Patel	Indian novelist, playwright and translator	March 10	96		
John Jakes	American writer (North and South, The Kent Family Chronicles)	March 11	90		
William G. Johnsson	Australian theologian and author	March 11	88		
Michel Peyramaure	French writer	March 11	101		
Isabel Colegate	British author (The Shooting Party) and literary agent	March 12	91		
Karel Kaplan	Czech historian	March 12	94		
Jaume Medina	Spanish philologist, translator and poet	March 12	73		
Dragoslav Mihailović	Serbian academic and playwright	March 12	92		
Momoko Kuroda	Japanese haiku poet and essayist	March 13	84	Brain hemorrhage	
Richard Wagner	Romanian-born German novelist	March 14	70		
Patrick French	British writer and historian (Tibet, Tibet, The World Is What It Is)	March 16	57	Cancer	
Anna Sujatha Mathai	Indian poet	March 16	89		
Jorge Edwards	Chilean novelist, journalist and diplomat	March 17	91		
Abdul Rahman Majeed al-Rubaie	Iraqi novelist (The Tattoo Mark)	March 20	83		
Eric Brown	British science fiction writer	March 21	62	Sepsis	
Harri Nykänen	Finnish crime writer	March 21	69		
Howard Fergus	Montserratian author and historian	March 23	85		
Rivka Basman Ben-Hayim	Lithuanian-born Israeli Yiddish poet	March 23	98		
Jean-Marie Apostolidès	Greek-French novelist, essayist, and theater director	March 24	79		
María Kodama	Argentine writer and translator; wife of Jorge Luis Borges	March 26	86	Breast cancer	
D. M. Thomas	British poet, translator and novelist (The Flute-Player, The White Hotel)	March 26	88		
April
Rachel Pollack	American science fiction author, comic book writer, and activist	April 7	77		
Anne Perry	British crime writer (The Cater Street Hangman)	April 10	84		
Harold Kushner	American rabbi, author, and lecturer (When Bad Things Happen to Good People)	April 28	88		
May
Andrew Delaplaine	American novelist and screenwriter (Meeting Spencer)	May 1	73	Stomach cancer	
Gabrielle Carey	Australian novelist (Puberty Blues)	May 2	64		
Henri Coulonges	French novelist and painter	May 4	86		
Rafael Guillén	Spanish poet	May 4	90	Stroke	
Haidar Haidar	Syrian novelist (The Desolate Time, A Feast for the Seaweeds, The Mirrors of Fire)	May 5	87		
Bruce McCall	Canadian author and illustrator	May 5	87	Complications from Parkinson's disease	
Philippe Sollers	French writer and literary critic, founder of Tel Quel and L'Infini	May 5	86		
Ingrid Arvidsson	Swedish poet, author, and diplomat	May 7	103		
Vladimir Dybo	Russian linguist	May 7	92		
Fred Siegel	American historian and conservative writer	May 7	78		
Ronald Steel	American author and biographer (Walter Lippmann)	May 7	92		
Samaresh Majumdar	Indian writer	May 8	79	Complications from COPD	
Heather Armstrong	American blogger and author	May 9	47	Suicide	
Josef Ehmer	Austrian historian	May 9	74		
Wilferd Madelung	German-British author and scholar of Islamic history	May 9	92		
Rosemary Crossley	Australian author	May 10	78		
Ian Hacking	Canadian philosopher (The Taming of Chance, Rewriting the Soul, Mad Travelers)	May 10	87		
Leon Comber	British military officer and author	May 11	101		
Sibylle Lewitscharoff	German writer	May 13	69		
Hassan Hallak	Lebanese historian and academic	May 15	77		
Eugene Kozlovsky	Russian writer, screenwriter, theatre and film director	May 15	76		
Inger Sandberg	Swedish children's author (The Little Ghost Godfrey, Lilla Anna and the Tall Uncle)	May 16	92		
Martin Amis	British novelist (London Fields, Money, Time's Arrow)	May 19	73	Esophageal cancer	
Pete Brown	English poet, lyricist ("I Feel Free", "Sunshine of Your Love", "White Room") and singer	May 19	82		
Dževad Karahasan	Bosnian writer, essayist and philosopher	May 19	70		
Veno Taufer	Slovenian poet, translator and playwright	May 20	90		
Antón Arrufat	Cuban writer and poet	May 21	87	Bronchopneumonia	
Erick Pohlhammer	Chilean poet	May 22	68	Complications from a stroke	
John Dunning	American novelist	May 23	81		
Lin Wenyue	Taiwanese writer and translator	May 26	89		
Govindray H. Nayak	Indian writer and academic	May 26	89		
Anita Cornwell	American author and activist	May 27	99		
Frédéric Barbier	French historian	May 28	70		
Choi Il-nam	South Korean writer	May 28	90		
Antonio Gala	Spanish poet, playwright and writer	May 28	92		
Asad Gulzoda	Tajik poet and linguist	May 29	88		
Ama Ata Aidoo	Ghanaian author and playwright (The Dilemma of a Ghost, Anowa)	May 31	81		
Vellayani Arjunan	Indian literary scholar	May 31	90		
June
Ronald L. Baker	American folklorist	June 1	85		
Byron Barton	American author and illustrator of children's books	June 3	92		
Khalid Kishtainy	Iraqi writer and satirist	June 3	93		
Mochtar Pabottingi	Indonesian writer	June 4	77	Heart attack	
Cormac McCarthy	American writer (Suttree, Blood Meridian, The Border Trilogy, No Country for Old Men, The Road)	June 13	89		
Robert Gottlieb	American author and editor	June 14	92		
Micere Githae Mugo	Kenyan writer, activist and professor	June 20	80	Cancer	
July
Ahn Junghyo	South Korean novelist and translator	July 1	81	Cancer	
Victoria Amelina	Ukrainian novelist	July 1	37	Russian attack	
Valeriano Bozal	Spanish historian and philosopher	July 2	82		
Zé Celso	Brazilian playwright and stage director (Teatro Oficina)	July 6	86	Injuries from a fire	
Lâm Thị Mỹ Dạ	Vietnamese poet	July 6	73		
Mary Ann Hoberman	American author and poet	July 7	92		
Ahmed Ilias	Bangladeshi poet	July 7	88		
José Mattoso	Portuguese historian and medievalist	July 8	90		
Adrian Tan	Singaporean novelist (The Teenage Textbook, The Teenage Workbook) and lawyer	July 8	57	Cancer	
Alain Besançon	French historian	July 9	91		
Jean-Jacques Becker	French historian	July 10	95		
Richard G. Hovannisian	American historian	July 10	90		
Marga Minco	Dutch journalist and writer	July 10	103		
Per Odensten	Swedish novelist and poet	July 10	84		
Ahmadreza Ahmadi	Iranian poet and screenwriter	July 11	83		
Milan Kundera	Czech-French writer (The Unbearable Lightness of Being, The Joke, The Book of Laughter and Forgetting)	July 11	94		
Colin Spencer	English writer and artist	July 13	89		
Bernard Bachrach	American historian	July 14	84		
Harry Frankfurt	American philosopher and author (On Bullshit, On Truth)	July 16	94	congestive heart failure	
Wasef Bakhtari	Afghan poet, literary figure and intellectual	July 19	80		
Silvana Lattmann	Italian-Swiss poet and author	July 19	104		
Jaime Galarza Zavala	Ecuadorian writer	July 20	92	lung disease	
Malú Urriola	Chilean poet	July 21	56		
Russell H. Greenan	American author (It Happened in Boston?)	July 22	97		
Howard Adelman	Canadian philosopher and academic	July 23	85		
Seiichi Morimura	Japanese novelist	July 24	90		
Gérard Besson	Trinidadian writer and publisher	July 25	81		
Shirish Kanekar	Indian writer and journalist	July 25	80		
Eduardo Pitta	Portuguese poet, fiction writer and essayist	July 25	73		
Lâm Quang Mỹ	Vietnamese-Polish poet	July 26	79		
Keith Waldrop	American poet	July 27	90		
Danila Comastri Montanari	Italian historical fiction novelist	July 28	74		
Martin Walser	German writer (Runaway Horse, A Man in Love, Marriage in Philippsburg)	July 28	96		
David Albahari	Serbian writer and translator	July 30	75		
August
Michela Murgia	Italian novelist and journalist	August 10	51	Cancer	
October
Louise Meriwether	American novelist, journalist and activist	October 10	100		
Louise Gluck	American poet (2020 Nobel Laureate in Literature)	October 13	80	Cancer	
November
A. S. Byatt	English novelist (The Virgin in the Garden, Possession, Still Life) and critic	November 16	87		
Eddie Linden	Scottish poet and publisher (Aquarius magazine)	November 19	88		
Tim Dorsey	American novelist	November 26	62		
John Nichols	American novelist	November 27	83		
December
Benjamin Zephaniah	British poet	December 7	65	Brain tumour	

== Awards ==
2023 literary award winners, sorted alphabetically by award
Award	Category	Author	Title	Ref.
Amazon.ca First Novel Award		Jasmine Sealy	The Island of Forgetting	
Astrid Lindgren Memorial Award		Laurie Halse Anderson		
Andrew Carnegie Medals for Excellence	Fiction	Julie Otsuka	The Swimmers	
Andrew Carnegie Medals for Excellence	Nonfiction	Ed Yong	An Immense World	
Baillie Gifford Prize	2023	John Vaillant	Fire Weather	
Baillie Gifford Prize	Anniversary	James S. Shapiro	1599: A Year in the Life of William Shakespeare	
Bookseller/Diagram Prize for Oddest Title of the Year		Matthew F Jordan	Danger Sound Klaxon! The Horn That Changed History	
Christopher Bland Prize		Paterson Joseph	The Secret Diaries of Charles Ignatius Sancho	
Danuta Gleed Literary Award		Kim Fu	Lesser Known Monsters of the 21st Century	
Duff Cooper Prize		Julian Jackson	France on Trial: The Case of Marshal Pétain	
Dylan Thomas Prize		Arinze Ifeakandu	God's Children Are Little Broken Things	
Edgar Awards	Critical/Biographical Work	Martin Edwards	The Life of Crime	
Edgar Awards	Fact Crime	Erika Krouse	Tell Me Everything	
Edgar Awards	First Novel	Eli Cranor	Don't Know Tough	
Edgar Awards	Juvenile	Marthe Jocelyn	Aggie Morton Mystery Queen	
Edgar Awards	Novel	Danya Kukafka	Notes on an Execution	
Edgar Awards	Paperback Original	Joe Hart	Or Else	
Edgar Awards	Short Story	Gregory Fallis	"Red Flag"	
Edgar Awards	Young Adult	June Hur	The Red Palace	
Edgar Awards	Lilian Jackson Braun Award	Tamara Berry	Buried in a Good Book	
Edgar Awards	Robert L. Fish Memorial Award	Mark Harrison	"Dogs in the Canyon"	
Edgar Awards	Simon & Schuster Mary Higgins Clark Award	B. R. Myers	A Dreadful Splendor	
Edgar Awards	Sue Grafton Memorial Award	Louisa Luna	Hideout	
Edgar Awards	Ellery Queen Award	The Strand Magazine		
Edgar Awards	Grand Master Award	Michael Connelly		
Edgar Awards	Grand Master Award	Joanne Fluke		
Edgar Awards	Raven Award	Crime Writers of Color		
Edgar Awards	Raven Award	Eddie Muller (Noir Alley and The Film Noir Foundation)		
Ezra Jack Keats Awards	Illustrator	Doug Salati	Hot Dog	
Ezra Jack Keats Awards	Writer	Kari Percival	How To Say Hello to a Worm	
Giller Prize		Sarah Bernstein	Study for Obedience	
Governor General's Awards	English Fiction	Anuja Varghese	Chrysalis	
Governor General's Awards	English Non-Fiction	Kyo Maclear	Unearthing	
Governor General's Awards	English Poetry	Hannah Green	Xanax Cowboy	
Governor General's Awards	English Drama	Cliff Cardinal	As You Like It, A Radical Retelling	
Governor General's Awards	English Children's Literature	Sarah Everett	The Probability of Everything	
Governor General's Awards	English Children's Illustration	Jack Wong	When You Can Swim	
Governor General's Awards	French to English Translation	Peter McCambridge	Rosa's Very Own Personal Revolution	
Governor General's Awards	French Fiction	Marie-Hélène Poitras	Galumpf	
Governor General's Awards	French Non-Fiction	Philippe Bernier Arcand	Faux rebelles : Les dérives du politiquement incorrect	
Governor General's Awards	French Poetry	Rita Mestokosho	Atikᵁ utei. Le cœur du caribou	
Governor General's Awards	French Drama	Mathieu Gosselin	Gros gars	
Governor General's Awards	French Children's literature	Lou Beauchesne	Linoubliable	
Governor General's Awards	French Children's illustration	Samuel Larochelle, Ève Patenaude	Le plus petit sauveur du monde	
Governor General's Awards	English to French translation	Catherine Ego	Dans lʼombre du soleil: Réflexions sur la race et les récits	
Griffin Poetry Prize	Best Poetry Book	Roger Reeves	Best Barbarian	
Griffin Poetry Prize	Best First Poetry Book	Emily Riddle	The Big Melt	
International Booker Prize		Georgi Gospodinov with Angela Rodel (translator)	Time Shelter	
International Dublin Literary Award		Katja Oskamp with Jo Heinrich (translator)	Marzahn, Mon Amour	
Lambda Literary Awards	Bisexual Fiction	Gwendolyn Kiste	Reluctant Immortals	
Lambda Literary Awards	Bisexual Nonfiction	Maria San Filippo	Appropriate Behavior	
Lambda Literary Awards	Bisexual Poetry	Nicky Beer	Real Phonies and Genuine Fakes	
Lambda Literary Awards	Comics	Sas Milledge	Mamo	
Lambda Literary Awards	Gay Fiction	Danny Ramadan	The Foghorn Echoes	
Lambda Literary Awards	Gay Memoir/Biography	Edgar Gomez	High-Risk Homosexual	
Lambda Literary Awards	Gay Poetry	Padraig Regan	Some Integrity	
Lambda Literary Awards	Gay Romance	Kosoko Jackson	I'm So Not Over You	
Lambda Literary Awards	Lesbian Fiction	K-Ming Chang	Gods of Want	
Lambda Literary Awards	Lesbian Memoir/Biography	Kathryn Schulz	Lost & Found: Reflections on Grief, Gratitude, and Happiness	
Lambda Literary Awards	Lesbian Poetry	Shelley Wong	As She Appears	
Lambda Literary Awards	Lesbian Romance	Nan Campbell	The Rules of Forever	
Lambda Literary Awards	LGBTQ Anthology	Julie R. Enszer and Elena Gross	OutWrite: The Speeches That Shaped LGBTQ Literary Culture	
Lambda Literary Awards	LGBTQ Children's	Wallace West	Mighty Red Riding Hood	
Lambda Literary Awards	LGBTQ Drama	Ho Ka Kei (Jeff Ho)	Iphigenia and the Furies (On Taurian Land) & Antigone: 方	
Lambda Literary Awards	LGBTQ+ Romance and Erotica	Alison Cochrun	Kiss Her Once For Me	
Lambda Literary Awards	LGBTQ Middle Grade	Maulik Pancholy	Nikhil Out Loud	
Lambda Literary Awards	LGBTQ Mystery	Hayley Scrivenor	Dirt Creek: A Novel	
Lambda Literary Awards	LGBTQ Nonfiction	Hafizah Augustus Geter	The Black Period: On Personhood, Race, and Origin	
Lambda Literary Awards	LGBTQ Speculative Fiction	Lianyu Tan	The Wicked and the Willing: An F/F Gothic Horror Vampire Novel	
Lambda Literary Awards	LGBTQ Studies	Darieck Scott	Keeping It Unreal: Black Queer Fantasy and Superhero Comics	
Lambda Literary Awards	LGBTQ Young Adult	Sonora Reyes	The Lesbiana's Guide to Catholic School	
Lambda Literary Awards	Transgender Fiction	Cat Fitzpatrick	The Call-Out	
Lambda Literary Awards	Transgender Nonfiction	Emma Grove	The Third Person	
Lambda Literary Awards	Transgender Poetry	Kamden Ishmael Hilliard	MissSettl	
Miles Franklin Award		Shankari Chandran	Chai Time at Cinnamon Gardens	
Nobel Prize in Literature		Jon Fosse	—	
Orwell Prize	Political Fiction	Tom Crewe	The New Life	
Orwell Prize	Political Writing	Peter Apps	Show Me the Bodies: How We Let Grenfell Happen	
PEN Literary Awards	Hemingway Foundation/PEN Award	Oscar Hokeah	Calling for a Blanket Dance	
PEN Literary Awards	PEN/Open Book	Hafizah Augustus Geter	The Black Period	
PEN Literary Awards	PEN/Diamonstein-Spielvogel Award for the Art of the Essay	Judith Thurman	A Left-Handed Woman	
PEN Literary Awards	PEN/Malamud Award	Edwidge Danticat		
PEN Literary Awards	Poetry in Translation	Daniel Borzutzky	The Loose Pearl by Paula Ilabaca Nuñez	
PEN Literary Awards	PEN/Robert W. Bingham Prize	Morgan Talty	Night of the Living Rez	
Pulitzer Prize	Biography	Beverly Gage	G-Man: J. Edgar Hoover and the Making of the American Century	
Pulitzer Prize	Fiction	Hernan Diaz	Trust	
Pulitzer Prize	Fiction	Barbara Kingsolver	Demon Copperhead	
Pulitzer Prize	General Nonfiction	Robert Samuels and Toluse Olorunnipa	His Name Is George Floyd	
Pulitzer Prize	History	Jefferson Cowie	Freedom's Dominion: A Saga of White Resistance to Federal Power	
Pulitzer Prize	Memoir or Autobiography	Hua Hsu	Stay True	
Pulitzer Prize	Poetry	Carl Phillips	Then the War: and Selected Poems, 2007–2020	
Royal Society Science Books Prize		Ed Yong	An Immense World: How Animal Senses Reveal the Hidden Realms Around Us	
Victorian Premier's Literary Awards	Overall	Jessica Au	Cold Enough for Snow	
Victorian Premier's Literary Awards	Drama	John Harvey	The Return	
Victorian Premier's Literary Awards	Fiction	Jessica Au	Cold Enough for Snow	
Victorian Premier's Literary Awards	Indigenous Writing	Lystra Rose	The Upwelling	
Victorian Premier's Literary Awards	Nonfiction	Eda Gunaydin	Root & Branch	
Victorian Premier's Literary Awards	People's Choice	Karlie Noon and Krystal De Napoli	Astronomy: Sky Country	
Victorian Premier's Literary Awards	Poetry	Gavin Yuan Gao	At the Altar of Touch	
Victorian Premier's Literary Awards	Unpublished Manuscript	Mick Cummins	One Divine Night	
Victorian Premier's Literary Awards	Young Adult	Kate Murray	We Who Hunt the Hollow	
Walter Scott Prize		Lucy Caldwell	These Days	
Writers' Trust of Canada	Atwood Gibson Writers' Trust Fiction Prize	Kai Thomas	In the Upper Country	
Writers' Trust of Canada	Hilary Weston Writers' Trust Prize for Nonfiction	Christina Sharpe	Ordinary Notes	
Writers' Trust of Canada	Dayne Ogilvie Prize	Anuja Varghese	Chrysalis	
Writers' Trust of Canada	Latner Griffin Writers' Trust Poetry Prize	Laisha Rosnau		
Writers' Trust of Canada	Matt Cohen Award	Helen Humphreys		
Writers' Trust of Canada	Vicky Metcalf Award for Literature for Young People	Kyo Maclear		
Writers' Trust of Canada	Writers' Trust Engel/Findley Award	Anosh Irani		
Writers' Trust of Canada	RBC Bronwen Wallace Award for Emerging Writers	Zak Jones	"So Much More to Say"	
Writers' Trust of Canada	RBC Bronwen Wallace Award for Emerging Writers	Cooper Skjeie	"Scattered Oblations"	

== Notable new movies and TV series based on books ==
Below are some of the most prominent film and television productions that premiered / were broadcast during 2023:

Title	The book on which the movie/TV series is based	Type	Genre	Premiere date	Distribution company / original broadcasting network
One True Loves	"One True Loves" by Taylor Jenkins Reid	Movie	Melodrama, romantic film	April 7, 2023	The Avenue
Beautiful Disaster	"Beautiful Disaster" by Jamie McGuire	Movie	Romantic drama	April 13, 2023	Voltage films
Queen Charlotte: A Bridgerton Story	Bridgerton series of books by Julia Quinn	TV series	Period drama, romantic drama	May 4, 2023	Netflix
The Zone of Interest	"The Zone of Interest" by Martin Amis	Movie	Historical drama	May 19, 2023	A24
Firebrand	"Queen's Gambit" by Elizabeth Fremantle	Movie	Historical drama	May 21, 2023	Prime Video
All of Us Strangers	"Strangers" by Taichi Yamada	Movie	Fantasy-romantic drama film	August 31, 2023	Searchlight Pictures
Love at First Sight	"The Statistical Probability of Love at First Sight" by Jennifer E. Smith	Movie	Romantic comedy	September 15, 2023	Netflix
The Hunger Games: The Ballad of Songbirds & Snakes	"The Ballad of Songbirds and Snakes" by Suzanne Collins	Movie	Action, Drama, Adventure	November 5, 2023	Lionsgate
Leave the World Behind	"Leave the World Behind" by Rumaan Alam	Movie	Psychological thriller	December 8, 2023	Netflix
Poor Things	"Poor Things" by Alasdair Gray	Movie	Fantasy, science fiction	December 8, 2023	Searchlight Pictures, Disney+
A Haunting in Venice	"Hallowe'en Party" by Agatha Christie	Movie	Detective film	December 11, 2023	20th Century Studios
