= The Flood (Al-Fayḍān) =

Syrian short story collection

(The Flood) Al-Fayḍān
- Author: Ḥaidar Ḥaidar
- Language: Arabic
- Genre: Short Stories
- Published: 1975
- Publisher: Al-Ward Publishing
- Publication place: Damascus, Syria
- Pages: 168

The Flood (Arabic: الفيضان, romanized: Al-Fayḍān) is a 1975 short story collection by the Syrian writer Ḥaidar Ḥaidar. The collection consists of 11 short stories, all centering on the themes of suppression and oppression experienced by Arab countries following their liberation revolutions. Similar to his other works, Ḥaidar Ḥaidar employs a stream-of-consciousness narrative style, delving into the psychology of the Arab world and the inner machinations of nationalistic pioneers.

== Stories in the collection ==
11 short stories make up the collection:

- Al-Namlu Wal Qat (Arabic: النمل والقط, lit. 'Ants and Cats')
- Al-Rihan (Arabic: الرهان, lit. 'The Bet')
- Al-Zawaghan (The Illusion)
- Ughniya Ḥazina Li Rajulin Kana Ḥayyan (Arabic: أغنية حزينة لرجلٍ كان حياً, lit. 'A Sad Song for A Man that Was Alive')
- Man Allathi Yathkuru Al-Ghaba? (Arabic: من الذي يذكر الغابة؟, lit. 'Who Recalls the Forest?')
- Ṣamtu An-Nar (Arabic: صمت النار, lit. 'Fire's Silence')
- Al-Ightiyal (Arabic: الإغتيال, lit. 'The Assassination')
- Al-Fayḍān (Arabic: الفيضان, lit. 'The Flood')
- Al-Juuʿ Wal Luṣuṣ Wal Qatala (Arabic: الجوع واللصوص والقتلة, lit. 'The Hunger, Thieves, and Killers')
- Al-Barabira (Arabic: البرابرة, lit. 'The Barbarians')
- Wishaḥun Wardiyun Li Rajulin Waḥid (Arabic: وشاحٌ وردياً لرجلٍ وحيد, lit. 'The Lonely Man’s Pink Scarf')

== Author's statements ==
Ḥaidar Ḥaidar attributes his use of stream-of-consciousness technique to his childhood experiences, noting that childhood recollections evoke a dream-like state more than reality. He has criticized traditional Arabic narratives for their simplistic portrayal of reality, arguing that they fail to delve into the inner workings of characters. Despite his Syrian origins, Ḥaidar views all Arab nations as part of a unified cause. His writing often adopts a cynical tone, yet he does not regard the plight of Arab countries as inevitable; rather, he sees reality as mutable and in need of reform. These themes are evident in his short story collection, 'The Flood'.

== Complete works of Ḥaidar Ḥaidar ==
- A Feast for the Seaweeds (Arabic: وليمة ل أعشاب البحر, romanized: Walimah li A'ashab al-Bahr) (Novel)
- The Desolate Time (Arabic: الزمن الموحش, romanized: Az-Zaman Al-Muwḥesh) (Novel)
- The Mirrors of Fire (Arabic: مرايا النار, romanized: Maraya An-Nar) (Novel)
- Elgies of Days: Three Stories on Death (Arabic: مراثي الأيام: ثلاث حكايةٌ عن الموت, romanized: Marathi Al-Ayyam: Thalathu Ḥiakayatun ʿAn Al-Mawt) (Novel)
- Immigration of Swallows (Arabic: هجرة السنونو, romanized: Hijratal Sununu) (Novel)
- Al-Fahd (Arabic: الفهد, lit. 'The Cheetah') (Novel)
- Al-Fayḍān (Arabic: الفيضان, lit. 'The Flood') (Short Stories)
- Ighwā’ (Arabic: إغواء, lit. 'Temptation') (Short Stories)
- Al-Wuʿul (The Deer) (Short Stories)
- Al-Wamḍ (Arabic: وميض, lit. 'The Shimmering') (Short Stories)
- Al-Tamawujāt (Arabic: التموجات, lit. 'The Ripples') (Two Stories)
- Awraqul Manfa: Shahadatun Ḥawla Zamanuna (Arabic: أوراق المنفى: شهادةٌ حول زماننا, lit. 'Exile's Papers: Testimony of Our Time')
