= Frédéric Barbier =

Frédéric Barbier can refer to:

- Frédéric Barbier (composer) (1829–1889), French composer
- Frédéric Barbier (historian) (1952–2023), French historian
- Frédéric Barbier (politician) (born 1960), French politician
