= The Country of the Blind (disambiguation) =

"The Country of the Blind" is a 1904 short story by H. G. Wells.

The Country of the Blind may also refer to:

- "The Country of the Blind", a poem by C. S. Lewis
- The Country of the Blind: A Memoir at the End of Sight, a 2023 memoir by Andrew Leland

== See also ==
- The Country of Blinds, a 1986 album by Skeleton Crew
- Country of the Blind, a 1997 novel by Christopher Brookmyre
- In the Country of the Blind, a 1991 novel by Michael Flynn
