= Going Infinite =

2023 book by Michael Lewis

Going Infinite: The Rise and Fall of a New Tycoon
- First edition cover
- Author: Michael Lewis
- Audio read by: Michael Lewis
- Language: English
- Subject: Sam Bankman-Fried; FTX
- Genre: Non-fiction
- Publisher: W. W. Norton & Company
- Publication date: October 3, 2023
- Publication place: United States
- Pages: 288
- ISBN: 978-1-324-07433-5

Going Infinite: The Rise and Fall of a New Tycoon is a 2023 book by Michael Lewis about Sam Bankman-Fried, a fraudster who founded the failed cryptocurrency exchange FTX. The book's publication date, October 3, 2023, coincided with the beginning of Bankman-Fried's trial on seven counts of fraud and money laundering. On November 2, 2023, in the case of United States v. Bankman-Fried, Bankman-Fried was convicted of all seven counts of fraud, conspiracy, and money laundering.

The book is an intimate account of Bankman-Fried's character and relationships, and stems from hundreds of interviews and unparalleled access that continued even after FTX collapsed in 2022. The book claims that the eight billion dollars prosecutors say were embezzled by Bankman-Fried may not have actually been stolen, and alleges that Bankman-Fried unsuccessfully sought to bribe Donald Trump to not run again for president.

Going Infinite has been criticized for being excessively credulous and overly sympathetic to Bankman-Fried, and lacking in insight despite the author's access. Lewis has rejected the criticism.

== Synopsis ==
Lewis met Bankman-Fried in 2021, introduced by Brad Katsuyama, head of the IEX stock exchange. Katsuyama was thinking of selling a stake of IEX to FTX. He asked Lewis to investigate Bankman-Fried. Lewis did so and came away impressed, believing that while Bankman-Fried was ambitious, he was not grandiose. The book delves into the character of Bankman-Fried in detail, describing his relationships, portraying him as easily distracted, obsessed with games, slovenly, eccentric, and good at calculating probabilities. It describes his practice of effective altruism, and reports that he wanted to pay Donald Trump to not run again for president of the United States. According to the book, Trump's team allegedly responded through a back channel that he would do so for $5 billion, which Bankman-Fried could not afford.

The Guardian reported that when Bankman-Fried was arrested in late 2022, Lewis had been following him for most of a year on the grounds that there was a book in him, but had not yet decided what form it should take. Lewis was allowed to remain with Bankman-Fried even while controversy began to swirl. His purpose was to understand the man; he did not notice anything amiss with Bankman-Fried, and was caught off guard when FTX went bankrupt. Lewis told The Guardian writer Samanth Subramanian that he did not believe Bankman-Fried had ever lied to him or had ever set out to enrich himself, and that he had not attempted to condemn Bankman-Fried, as the mootness of his guilt meant it would not have served any narrative purpose.

In the book, Bankman-Fried recounts his theories about what led to the collapse, while insisting that he acted in good faith. Lewis writes that FTX was arguably solvent right up until its collapse, and that money prosecutors had alleged was embezzled by Bankman-Fried was, according to his own rudimentary calculations, still there. He is also critical of John J. Ray III, brought in as CEO by the bankruptcy court to untangle FTX's finances after the collapse. Recounting his time with Bankman-Fried after FTX collapsed and he was accused of a massive fraud, Lewis writes that as late as October 2022, one could have investigated the firm ad nauseam and still not suspected wrongdoing.

== Reception ==
Los Angeles Times columnist Michael Hiltzik called the book "a textbook on the imperative need to approach a subject with a healthy helping of skepticism." Lewis, he asserts, "doesn't exercise any." He argues that a "torrent of nonsense" from Bankman-Fried in 2022 explaining FTX's losses "didn't snow many people who knew anything about finance and weren't angling for a piece of his action", but that "it sure seems to have snowed the hell out of Michael Lewis."

New York Times book critic Jennifer Szalai claims that reading this "strange new book" provides "the sense that Lewis felt unusually flummoxed by his material." She describes Lewis as "stubbornly credulous", writing that he initially expected to write a favorable "unsung hero" story as he had so often in the past, that "zombie traces" of that are in the book, but that he was taken by surprise by FTX's collapse. Szalai contends that Lewis' assertion that there were no signs "anything was amiss" in October 2022 is contradicted by an April 2022 interview in which Bankman-Fried "all but admitted that the cryptocurrency industry—the linchpin of the Bankman-Fried edifice—was like a Ponzi scheme". She describes his intimate access to Bankman-Fried after the collapse as "a front-row seat—from which he could apparently see nothing."

Writing in the Los Angeles Times, book critic Julia M. Klein called the book "well-timed, if unsatisfyingly convoluted." She writes that the book is not for those seeking a "definitive take" on Bankman-Fried's guilt or innocence, that it is "labyrinthine and downright arcane", and does not do an adequate job of explaining the intricacies of cryptocurrencies. Lewis, she writes, "throws up his hands" at the prospect of describing bitcoin. She argues that while there are fascinating passages, exactly "how this bizarre child-man was able to seduce so many people into following him around the world into unregulated, unhinged and possibly illegal enterprises remains a mystery."

James Ledbetter writes in The Washington Post that the description of the alleged Trump bribery plan is unsatisfying, leaving the reader wanting to know more, and that "at moments Lewis seems so willing to let Bankman-Fried off the hook, even after Bankman-Fried was charged with fraud and money-laundering." He writes that Lewis "spends much of the end of the book second-guessing the choices and interpretations made by John Ray, the CEO appointed to run FTX after it went bankrupt, rather than drill down into the company's fraud (admittedly, no easy task)."

Going Infinite appeared shortly after publication of the book by Zeke Faux about Bankman-Fried and crypto, Number Go Up, and received less favorable reviews than the Faux book. Lewis has engaged with criticism of the book, saying "Some people will be threatened by the truth", and that the "full story will do violence to their mental picture." Faux had reported in New York magazine that he saw Lewis "fawning" over Bankman-Fried during an onstage interview in 2022. In an interview with the New York Times, Lewis accused Faux of "trying to torpedo a rival book before it comes out", calling it "corrupt" and saying, "So who do I think is more skeevy, Sam or him? I'd have to think about that."

== Adaptation ==
As Lewis was shadowing Bankman-Fried, before Lewis had even begun writing the book, Apple paid the author $5 million to acquire the screen rights for his eventual written account.
