= Agnès Laroche =

French author and novelist (1965–2023)

- Born: 1 December 1965; Paris, France
- Died: 11 February 2023 (aged 57)
- Occupations: Author; Novelist

Agnès Laroche (1 December 1965 – 11 February 2023) was a French author and novelist.

== Biography ==
Born in Paris on 1 December 1965, Laroche wrote numerous fictional works to be broadcast on the radio and youth novels published in children's press. She wrote her first book at the age of 43. Prior to her career as an author, she worked in professional integration for 20 years. Since then, she wrote approximately 40 books. She primarily wrote out of her home in Angoulême. She was married, and was the mother of three children.

In 2015, Laroche was awarded the Prix des Incorruptibles for her youth novel, Rue des petits singes. That same year, she won the Prix Mon ami for Le fantôme de Sarah Fisher.

Laroche died after a long illness on 11 February 2023, at the age of 57.

== Works ==
- Tim Sans-dragon (2008)
- Un copain de plus (2009)
- La Drôle de vie d'Archie (2009)
- Scoops au lycée (2010)
- Murder Party (2010)
- Super-Jojo fait l'école buissonnière (2010)
- Cours Ayana ! (2011)
- Cœur de vampire (2011)
- Le Fantôme de Sarah Fisher (2011)
- La Dragonne de minuit (2011)
- Scoops au lycée (2012)
- Tim sans dragon (2012)
- Nicodème (2012)
- Sauve-toi Nora (2012)
- Rue des petits singes (2013)
- La vraie recette de l'amour (2013)
- Le Mot magique (2013)
- C'est qui le Roi des animaux ? (2013)
- Tu vas payer (2013)
- Duo pour une enquête (2014)
- Charly et moi (2015)
- La vraie recette de l'amour (2016)
- Cœurs en fuite (2017)
- La vie dure trois minutes (2018)
- Prunelle, Sorcière Rebelle (2021)
- Prunelle, l’Ultime Sortilège (2022)
