= Scott Shane =

American journalist (born 1954)

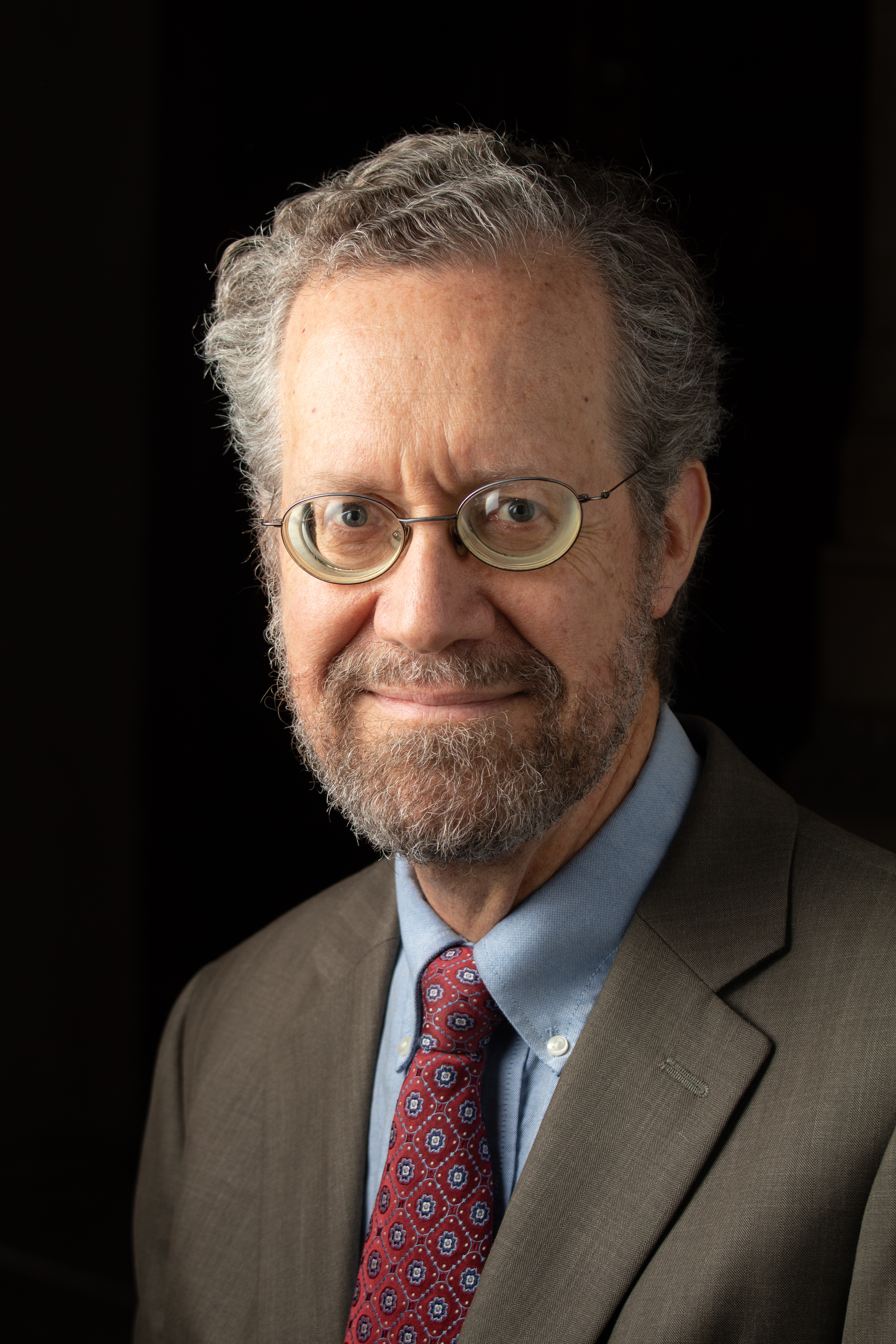
- Shane at the 2018 Pulitzer Prizes
- Born: May 22, 1954 (age 72); Augusta, Georgia
- Education: BA in English literature, Williams College, 1976; MA in English literature, Oxford University, 1978
- Occupations: Reporter, writer
- Notable credit(s): The New York Times; The Baltimore Sun

Scott Shane (born May 22, 1954 in Augusta, Georgia) is an American journalist and author, employed by The New York Times until 2023, reporting principally about the United States intelligence community. In 2023, his nonfiction book Flee North: A Forgotten Hero and the Fight for Freedom in Slavery's Borderland was published by Celadon Books.

== Career and education ==
Shane received a bachelor's from Williams College and a master's from Oxford University. He began his journalism career as a news clerk for The Washington Star (1979–1980), then as a local news reporter for the Greensboro (NC) News & Record (1980–1983). He became a reporter for The Baltimore Sun (1983–2004), he served for two years as their Moscow correspondent (1988–1991). Since 2004 he has been a national news reporter for The New York Times.

Shane also made an appearance in the HBO series "The Wire" (Season 5, episode 2), playing himself. He is author of Objective Troy: A Terrorist, A President, and the Rise of the Drone, which won the 2016 Lionel Gelber Prize. This book tells the story of Anwar al-Awlaki, who won fame as an imam outside Washington after the 9/11 attacks but eventually joined Al Qaeda in Yemen and was killed by a drone strike in 2011 on the orders of the then President Obama. He was the first U.S. citizen hunted and killed by his own government since the Civil War.

Before joining The New York Times, from 1983 to 2004 Shane was a reporter for The Baltimore Sun covering a range of subjects. He was The Baltimore Sun's Moscow correspondent from 1988 until 1991. Shane witnessed and reported on a crucial time in Russia's modern history. His book Dismantling Utopia: How Information Ended the Soviet Union provided a brilliant insight into the root causes of the demise of the Soviet regime. One of the main protagonists in the book was a dissident and political prisoner Andrei Mironov.

In 1995, he and Tom Bowman wrote series of six articles on the National Security Agency. This was the first major investigation of the NSA since James Bamford's 1982 book The Puzzle Palace. The Baltimore Sun is the home-delivery newspaper for many NSA employees working at Fort Meade.

Apart from his role as a reporter of the news, Shane became part of the news himself for his contact with former CIA officer John Kiriakou, who was sentenced to 30 months in prison on January 25, 2013, after entering into a plea-bargain agreement in which he accepted conviction for violation of one count of the Intelligence Identities Protection Act, in return for all other charges against him by the government being dropped. Kiriakou's attorneys had sought to depose Shane (named as "Journalist B" in the indictment) as part of his defense, but withdrew their subpoena to do so. The prosecution had contended that Kiriakou had been a source for Shane's 2008 report that named non-covert CIA employee Deuce Martinez as having been an interrogator of Khalid Shaikh Mohammed, the mastermind of the attacks of September 11, 2001, although Martinez did not participate in the extensive pre-questioning waterboarding of "KSM". Shane wrote about his relationship with Kiriakou in a rare, first-person account published by The New York Times of a reporter's role in a story involving national security and secrecy.

Shane left The Times in 2023. That same year, in September, his book Flee North, an account of Thomas Smallwood, was published.
