= The World Is What It Is =

Biography of V. S. Naipaul by Patrick French

The World Is What It Is: The Authorized Biography of V. S. Naipaul
- Author: Patrick French
- Language: English
- Subject: V. S. Naipaul
- Genre: Biography
- Publication date: January 1, 2008
- Pages: 554
- ISBN: 9781400044054 Hardcover

The World Is What It Is: The Authorized Biography of V. S. Naipaul is a biography of the Nobel Prize-winning author V. S. Naipaul by Patrick French. It was published in 2008 (by Picador in the UK and Knopf in the USA). The title is the opening sentence from Naipaul's book A Bend in the River:

The world is what it is; men who are nothing, who allow themselves to become nothing, have no place in it.

French deals with Naipaul's family background and his life from his birth in 1932 until his second marriage in 1996.

== Reception ==
The biography has been reviewed by The New York Times, Literary Review, The Independent, and The Times, among others. The reviewers include Paul Theroux, who wrote an earlier book about Naipaul.

The biography won unanimous praise from all quarters including Naipaul experts Teju Cole and James Wood in the New Yorker.

=== Awards and honors ===
The biography was selected by the editors of the New York Times Book Review as one of the Times' "10 Best Books of 2008." It won the 2008 National Book Critics Circle Award for Biography, and the British literary award the Hawthornden Prize.
