= Rebecca, Not Becky =

2023 novel by Christine Platt and Catherine Greene

- Author: Christine Platt & Catherine Wigginton Greene
- Publication date: December 5, 2023
- Pages: 336
- ISBN: 9780063213586

Rebecca, Not Becky is a 2023 novel by Christine Platt and Catherine Wigginton Greene.

== Plot ==
De'Andrea Whitman, her husband Malik, and their daughter move to Rolling Hills, a wealthy community in Northern Virginia. Whitman, who is Black, meets Rebecca Myland, a white woman. Over the course of the novel, the two begin to become friends and join forces to organize an effort to remove a Confederate statue from the town's park.

== Development history ==
Rebecca, Not Becky is Platt and Greene's first collaboration and Platt's first adult novel. Platt is a Black woman and Greene is a white woman and the theme of interracial friendships is present throughout the novel. The pair described the writing process as being "hard as hell," in part because of the racial dynamic.

=== Publication history ===
The novel was published by Amistad on December 5, 2023.

== Reception ==
The Washington Post wrote that the plot was engaging and praised De'Andrea and Rebecca's characterization. Booklist praised the book's dual-perspective and humorous tone, saying that it was "a timely confrontation of white privilege." Shelf Awareness described the book as "hugely enjoyable" and noted that the book's social critique was nuanced and detailed. Publishers Weekly positively described the book's satire, saying that the plot was engaging and comparing the book to Kiley Reid's 2019 novel Such a Fun Age. Kirkus Reviews also praised the satirical plot and described the novel as "savvy fun."
