= The Guest Lecture =

2023 book by Martin Riker

- First edition cover
- Author: Martin Riker
- Language: English
- Publisher: Black Cat (Grove Atlantic)
- Publication date: January 24, 2023
- Publication place: United States
- Media type: Print (paperback)
- Pages: 256
- ISBN: 978-0-8021-6041-6

The Guest Lecture is a novel by Martin Riker which was published on 24 January 2023 by Grove Atlantic. It received widespread critical acclaim upon release.

== Synopsis ==
The novel takes place over a single night in a hotel room. Abigail, an economist who has recently been denied tenure, lies awake next to her husband Ed and their daughter Ali. The next day, Abigail is supposed to give a guest lecture on John Maynard Keynes 1930 essay "Economic Possibilities for our Grandchildren," but she is unprepared and planning to improvise. Unable to sleep, she rehearses the talk using the method of loci, wherein she associates each part of the lecture with a room of her family's home. Throughout the rehearsal, an imagined Keynes offers her advice and steers her back to the lecture when she drifts.

Abby's argument in the lecture is that Keynes' essay should be read as a utopian thought experiment rather than a genuine prediction of the future. Over the course of her rehearsal, she recalls various moments from her life, including an undergraduate course in economics, her authorship of a widely-shared essay on economics and optimism, and various episodes from her family life. She also worries about the failure of her recently-published book and fears that her family will have to sell their house in order to survive. By the end of the night, Abby resolves to worry less and to treat herself better. As she fades into sleep, she dreams of searching a large building for the auditorium where her audience is waiting, eventually walking on stage to face the crowd.

== Development ==
The Guest Lecture is Riker's second novel after 2018's Samuel Johnson's Eternal Return. Riker worked for ten years as associated director of Dalkey Archive Press and co-founded the feminist press Dorothy with his wife, the novelist Danielle Dutton. At the time of The Guest Lecture's publication, Riker was a senior lecturer in English at Washington University in St. Louis.

Riker had wanted to write a book set over the course of a single night for about fifteen years, but said that it only became possible once "Abby’s voice came into [his] life." He conceived the novel as an interior monologue and invested a significant amount of time into planning the book, drawing a schematic of the room's in Abby's family home before beginning to write. In an interview with Lincoln Michel, Riker said that he was influenced by Georges Perec's novel Life: A User's Manual. In representing Keynes in the novel, Riker said that he worried little about fidelity to the real Keynes and that the version of Keynes imagined by Abigail was meant to be a reflection of Abigail herself.

=== Publication history ===
The Guest Lecture was published in the United States by Black Cat, an imprint of Grove Press, on January 24, 2023.

== Critical reception ==
The novel received positive reviews from critics upon release. Meghan O'Gieblyn, writing in The New York Review of Books, praised Riker's "virtuosity" in writing across gender and profession, writing that Abigail "is among the most convincing female narrators written by a man." Library Journal likewise wrote that Riker overturns the assumption that men cannot write convincingly about women. The New York Times' Dwight Garner was also positive, comparing the novel to Julian Barnes's Flaubert's Parrot and Geoff Dyer's Out of Sheer Rage, while the Associated Press called it a "quirky second novel of breathtaking genius".

The Harvard Review drew a positive comparison between the novel's stream-of-consciousness prose and the final chapter of James Joyce's Ulysses but criticized the book for "never get[ting] outside of Abby’s own head." The New Yorker published a measured review, complimenting Riker's use of the method of loci but criticizing the novel's references to Trump-era politics, which it described as "disrupting the vividly peripatetic flow of thought with the clumsiness of cliché." A separate review in The New Yorker praised the book's form as innovative. Publishers Weekly gave the novel a starred review, while Kirkus Reviews and Booklist were also positive.

Several reviews drew attention to Riker's criticism of academia, with The Washington Post writing that the book made "a credible critique of academia’s priorities." Inside Higher Ed described the book as the year's "must-read academic novel" and wrote that it served as an "indictment of mainstream economics," while the California Review of Books said that the book moves beyond being "a critical study in disguise" to make a deeper point about self-realization and self-acceptance.

The novel was selected for the American Booksellers Association's February 2023 Indie Next List. It was also named on several end-of-year "Best Books" lists, including NPR's and The New Yorker's.
