= Haidar Haidar =

Syrian writer and novelist (1936–2023)

- Native name: حيدر حيدر
- Born: 1936; Husayn al-Baher, Syria
- Died: 5 May 2023 (aged 87); Husayn al-Baher
- Occupation: literary writer
- Language: Arabic
- Period: 1968-2001
- Notable works: The Desolate Time, A Feast for the Seaweeds, The Mirrors of Fire

Haidar Haidar (Arabic: حيدر حيدر; 1936 – 5 May 2023) was a Syrian writer and novelist. He acquired a wide reputation for his critical attitude towards political and religious institutions and his willingness to cover controversial topics in a rational way. He published seventeen books of fiction, short stories, essays and biography, including The Desolate Time (Az-Zaman al-Muhish), which was chosen by the Arab Writers Union as one of the best 105 books of the 20th century.

== Literary career ==
His novel Walimah li A'ashab al-Bahr, (A Feast for the Seaweeds), was banned in several Arab countries, and even resulted in a belated angry reaction from the clerics of Al-Azhar University upon reprinting in Egypt in the year 2000. The clerics issued a Fatwa banning the novel, and accused Haidar of heresy and offending Islam. Al-Azhar University students staged huge protests against the novel, that eventually led to its confiscation. According to a BBC News report about the protests, "the plot centres on two leftist Iraqi intellectuals who fled the injustice of Iraqi President Saddam Hussein in the late 1970s. The characters blame political oppression in the Arab world on dictatorships and conservative movements. In one of the most controversial extracts, God is described as a failed artist."

In a 2019 interview for the magazine The Common, Hisham Bustani wrote about Haidar: "He has kept a fierce, critical distance from all sides: the dictatorship of the ruling regime in his country of Syria; the dictatorship of public taste and ‘conventions;’ the oppression of dogmatic ideology and the ruling party; the tyranny of power derived from religion."

Indeed, we have not yet fully understood our turath [(heritage)]. In order to do so, we need to re-read it in a scientific, historical, secular, objective way - to de-holify it, re-interpret its texts, and critique it with openness, with the ruthless scalpel of a surgeon and without the restriction of “holiness.” We need to approach it away from the dichotomy of the sacred and the profane, and away from irrational and superstitious attitudes. This is what puts religious heritage on a veracious and rational path. This is what I aspire for in my literary writings.

— Haidar Haidar, Syrian writer

Haidar died on 5 May 2023, at the age of 87.

== Works ==
=== Novels ===
- Al-Fahd (Arabic: الفهد, lit. 'The Cheetah'), 1968
- Az-Zaman al-Muhish (Arabic: الزمن الموحش, lit. 'The Desolate Time'), 1973
- Walimah li A'ashab al-Bahr (Arabic: وليمة لأعشاب البحر, lit. 'A Feast for the Seaweeds') 1983
- Maraya an-Nar (Arabic: مرايا النار, lit. 'The Mirrors of Fire'), 1992
- Shumous al-Ghajar (Arabic: شموس الغجر, lit. 'The Suns of Gypsies'), 1996
- Haql Urjuwan (Arabic: حقل أرجوان, lit. 'A Field of Purple'), 2000
- Marathi al-Ayyam (Arabic: مراثي الأيام, lit. 'The Elegies of Days'), 2001

=== Short stories ===
- Hakaya an-Nawrass al-Muhajir (Arabic: حكايا النورس المهاجر, lit. 'Tales of the Migrating Seagull'), 1968
- Al-Wamdh (Arabic: الومض, lit. 'The Flash'), 1970
- Al-Faiadhan (Arabic: الفيضان, lit. 'The Flood'), 1975
- Al-Wu'ul (Arabic: الوعول, lit. 'The Ibecis'), 1978
- At-Tamawujat (Arabic: التموجات, lit. 'The Ripples'), 1982
- Ghasaq al-Aalihah (Arabic: غسق الآلهة, lit. 'The Dusk of Gods'), 1994

=== Other works ===
- Capucci (Arabic: كبوتشي, lit. 'biography of Capucci'), 1978
- Awraq al-Manfa (Arabic: أوراق المنفى, lit. 'Exile Papers'), 1993
- Olumona (Arabic: علومنا, lit. 'Our Sciences')

== Death ==
Haidar Haidar died on 5 May 2023, at the age of 87.

== See also ==
- Syrian literature
