= Inger and Lasse Sandberg =

Swedish writers

Inger and Lasse Sandberg were Swedish authors of children's books. The stories were written by Inger and illustrated by her husband Lasse. They have created many characters, including The Little Ghost Godfrey (Sw: Lilla Spöket Laban) and Little Anna and the Tall Uncle. Inger received the Nils Holgersson Plaque. They were joint recipients of Expressens Heffaklump in 1969.

Lasse Sandberg was born in Stockholm on 17 February 1924 and died in Karlstad on 11 November 2008, at the age of 84. Lasse Sandberg was also known as a talented artist and, formerly, a cartoonist and comic creator in his home country.

Inger Sandberg was born in Karlstad on 2 August 1930 and died in the same city on 16 May 2023, at the age of 92.
