= In Every Life =

2023 picture book

- Author: Marla Frazee
- Publisher: Beach Lane Books
- Publication date: February 7, 2023
- Pages: 32
- ISBN: 978-1-665-91248-8

In Every Life is a 2023 picture book by American writer and illustrator Marla Frazee. The 32-page book was released on February 7, 2023, and received a 2024 Caldecott Honor for its illustrations. Frazee has said it took her 25 years to complete the book after first having the idea after hearing it as a prayer.

The book received starred reviews from Publishers Weekly and School Library Journal.
