= Anuja Varghese =

Canadian writer

- Education: McGill University (BA); University of Toronto (creative writing certificate)
- Occupations: Short story writer, novelist
- Writing career
- Notable work: Chrysalis
- Notable awards: Dayne Ogilvie Prize (2023); Governor General's Award for English-language fiction (2023); Hamilton Literary Award for Fiction
- Website: www.anujavarghese.com

Anuja Varghese is a Canadian writer from Hamilton, Ontario.

She has a BA from McGill University, and a Creative Writing Certificate from the University of Toronto School of Continuing Studies where she has also been an instructor. Varghese is bisexual.

== Awards and honours ==
=== Recognition for Chrysalis ===
- 2023: Won the Dayne Ogilvie Prize.
- 2023: Won the Governor General's Award for English-language fiction.
- 2024: Won the Hamilton Literary Award for Fiction.
- 2024: Longlisted for the Carol Shields Prize for Fiction.
- 2024: Shortlisted for the Kobo Emerging Writer Prize in literary fiction.

=== Other literary recognition ===
- 2016: Longlisted for the PRISM international Short Fiction Contest for "The Woman, The Man, The Husband, The Grave".
- 2019: Won third prize in the Alice Munro Festival Short Story Competition.
- 2019: Shortlisted for the Pigeon Pages Fiction Contest.
- 2020: Received an honourable mention for "Stop Rewind" in the Alvin A. Lee Award for Creative Non-Fiction category at Hamilton's Short Works Prize.
- 2020: Received an honourable mention for the short story "Chrysalis" in the Freda Waldon Award for Fiction category at Hamilton's Short Works Prize.
- 2021: Nominated for a Pushcart Prize.
- 2022: Won the Alvin A. Lee Award for Creative Non-Fiction at Hamilton's Short Works Prize for "Spark Hunter: Secret Life of a Matchmaker".
- 2022: Received an honourable mention for "Cherry Blossom Fever" in the Freda Waldon Award for Fiction category at Hamilton's Short Works Prize.

=== Alumni honour ===
- 2025: Received the Isadore Sharp Outstanding Recent Graduate Award from Toronto Metropolitan University.

== Works ==
=== Novels ===
- A Kiss of Crimson Ash (2026). Penguin Canada. ISBN 9781037800269.

=== Short story collections ===
- Chrysalis (2023). House of Anansi Press. ISBN 9781487011666.

=== Short stories ===
- "Throwing Salt"

=== Anthology contributions ===
- Queer Little Nightmares (2022). Arsenal Pulp Press.
- When Other People Saw Us, They Saw the Dead (2022). Haunt Publishing.
- Devouring Tomorrow: Fiction from the Future of Food (2025). Dundurn Press. ISBN 9781459754980.
