= Malcolm Harris =

American journalist, critic, and editor

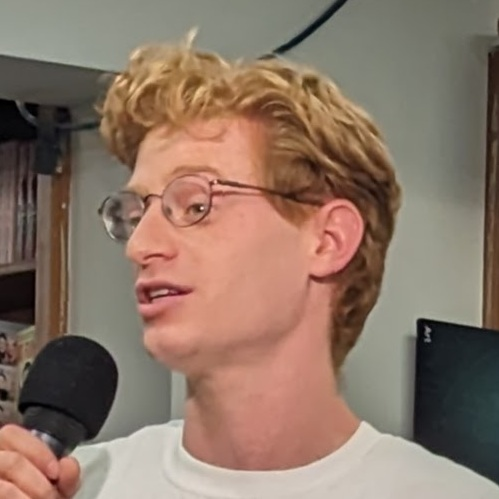
- Harris in 2023
- Born: 1988 (age 37–38); Santa Cruz, California, U.S.
- Education: University of Maryland
- Occupations: Journalist; critic; editor

Malcolm Harris (born 1988) is an American journalist, critic, and editor based on the East Coast of the United States.

He is an editor at The New Inquiry and wrote Kids These Days: The Making of Millennials (2017) and Palo Alto: A History of California, Capitalism, and the World (2023). Harris was involved in the Occupy Wall Street movement.

== Early life and education ==
Harris was born in Santa Cruz, California, and grew up in Palo Alto after his family moved there while he was in grade school. He is both of Jewish and Irish heritage. He graduated from the University of Maryland in 2010.

== Career ==
Harris is an editor at the online magazine The New Inquiry. He has also contributed pieces to the magazine on Zionism as white nationalism, capitalist schooling, accelerationism, and prison theater companies.

Harris was "heavily involved" in the Occupy Wall Street movement. In 2012, he pleaded guilty and was convicted of disorderly conduct for his participation in an October 2011 Occupy protest on the Brooklyn Bridge. The court case became "a significant focus of attention for its involvement of posts to social networking sites and legal arguments over who controls that material," as the prosecution sought to undermine his defense using his own Tweets which he had deleted.

Harris's 2017 book, Kids These Days: The Making of Millennials, is a social critique of American millennials as human capital. In it, he explores the economic, social, and political conditions and institutions that nurtured American millennials and shaped them into a distinct group. Yohann Koshy wrote in the Financial Times that Harris argues that "society conspires to make life worse for young people," that "millennials are producing lots of value at work that is not reflected in job quality or wages," and that much of this applies to the United Kingdom too.

In 2020, he released Shit Is Fucked Up and Bullshit: History Since the End of History, a collection of essays written from 2010 to 2019 about the worsening of general life and politics in that decade, through topics such as gender, wages, millenials, Marx, and popular media.

During the COVID-19 pandemic, Harris spent time writing about his home town of Palo Alto, California. The resulting book, Palo Alto: A History of California, Capitalism, and the World, which was published in February 2023, details the history of that city and its role in the 21st-century U.S. economy, which is largely defined by the Internet and the electronic devices produced in Silicon Valley. One review of the book said that it is “nominally a history, but it is really a work of grand theory [...] Marxism” and describes a “capitalist horror show.”

His 2025 book What's Left: Three Paths Through the Planetary Crisis focuses on the climate crisis and the options available for averting it: markets, collective action, and communism.

== Personal life ==
He lives in the East Coast of the U.S.

== Publications ==
- Kids These Days: The Making of Millennials. New York: Little, Brown and Company. 2017. ISBN 978-0316510868.
- Shit Is Fucked Up and Bullshit: History Since the End of History. Melville House. 2020. ISBN 9781612198378.
- Palo Alto: A History of California, Capitalism, and the World. Little, Brown and Company. 2023. ISBN 9780316592031.
- What's Left: Three Paths Through the Planetary Crisis. Hachette Book Group. 2025. ISBN 9781668646861.
