= The Little Ghost Godfrey =

Little Ghost Laban
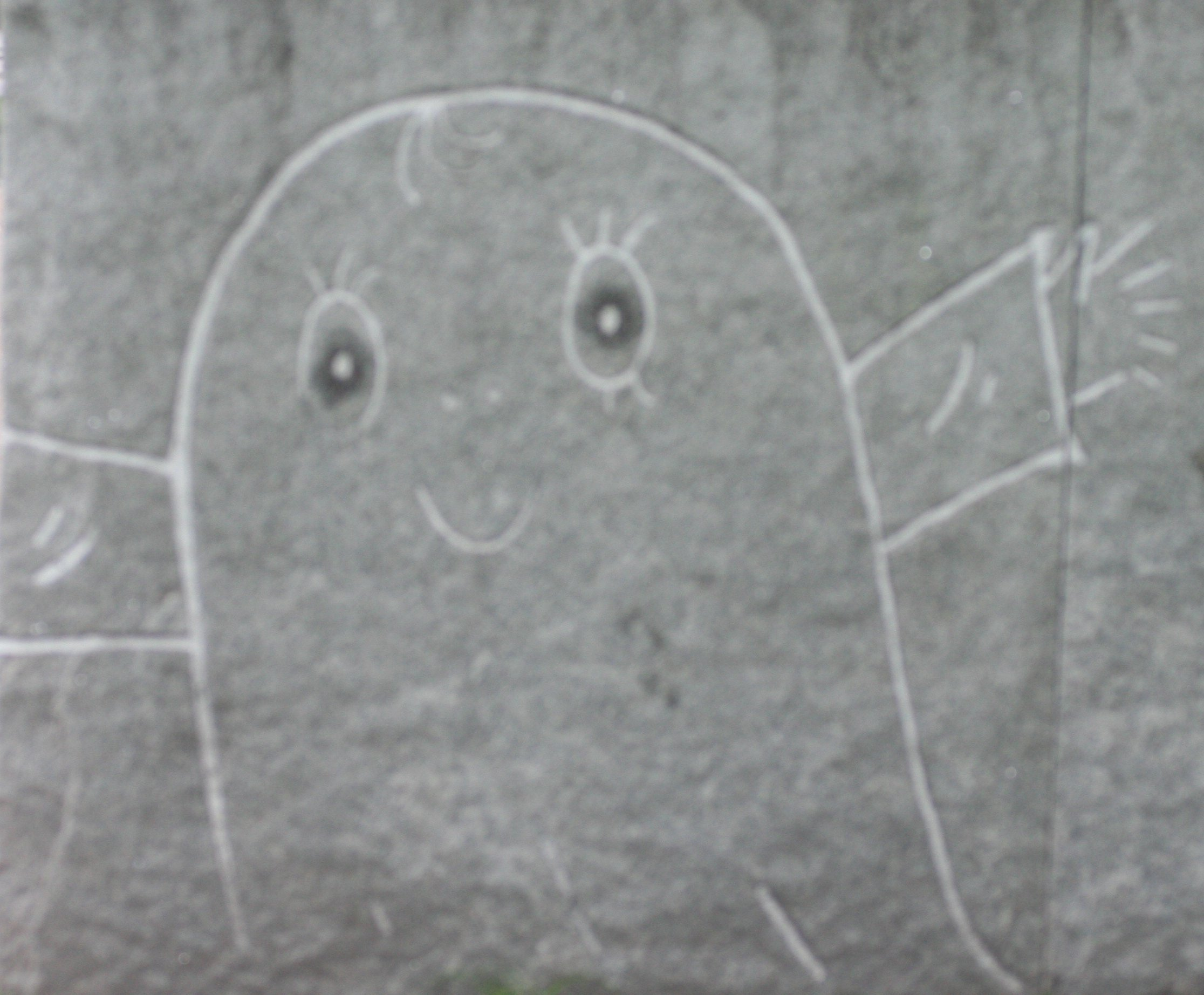
- Little Ghost Laban as public art in Karlstad.
- First appearance: 1965
- Created by: Inger and Lasse Sandberg

In-universe information
- Gender: male

Little Ghost Laban (Swedish: Lilla spöket Laban [Laban the Little Spook]) or "the ghost who wouldn't haunt", is a Swedish children's book character created by Inger and Lasse Sandberg from Karlstad Municipality. The books revolve around the boy ghost Laban and his family, the Father ghost, the Mother ghost and Laban's sister Labolina. The first book about Laban was published in 1965.

== Background ==
Laban is a friendly character who does not want to haunt and scare people, and who lives in the basement of the castle "Gomorronsol" where he is friends with the youngest prince. The setting is domestic and shows the everyday life of the characters. The characters were created to help the creators' son Nicklas get over his fear of ghosts as a child.

Other characters created by the authors include The Thumb and Little Anna.

== Books ==
Year (Sweden)	Swedish titles	English titles	Alternative titles	Translated by	Notes
1965	Lilla spöket Laban	Little ghost Laban (1968)	Little Spook (1969), Little Spook Laban (2009)	Kersti French, Nancy Swenson Leupold, Carrie and Fredrik Magnusson and Ralf Askman	ISBN 9789197774314
1977	Gissa vem jag är i dag?, sa Labolina	Tiny Spook's guessing game (1978)			ISBN 0416869009
1977	Kommer snart, sa Laban och Labolina	Little Spook's grubby day (1978)	In a minute, said Laban and Labolina (2009)	Carrie and Fredrik Magnusson and Ralf Askman	ISBN 0416868908 and ISBN 9789197774345
1977	Labolinas lina	Tiny Spook's tugging game (1978)			ISBN 0416869300
1977	Labolinas snubbeldag	Tiny Spook's tumbles (1978)			ISBN 0416869106
1977	Lilla spöket Laban får en lillasyster	Little Spook's baby sister (1978)			ISBN 0416869203
1977	Pappa är sjuk, sa lilla spöket Laban	Little Spook haunts again (1978)			ISBN 0416868800
1978	Var är Labolinas Millimina?	Little Spook and the lost doll (1980)			ISBN 0416874800
1980	Glad spökjul	A merry spook Christmas! (1980)		Ray Bradfield	
1991	Laban och Labolinas jul	Labans & Labolinas christmas (2009)		Carrie and Fredrik Magnusson and Ralf Askman	ISBN 9789197774369
1992	Sov gott pappa!, sa Lilla Spöket Laban	Sleep well dad, said Little Spook Laban (2008)		Carrie and Fredrik Magnusson and Ralf Askman	ISBN 9789197774321
1993	Spökpappan i simskolan	The ghost father in swimming school			
2004	Vem är det som låter? sa Spöket Laban	Who's making that noise? (2008)		Carrie and Fredrik Magnusson and Ralf Askman	ISBN 9789197774338
2005	Är det jul nu igen? sa Spöket Laban	Is it Christmas again? said Little Spook Laban (2009)		Carrie and Fredrik Magnusson and Ralf Askman	ISBN 9789197774376

== See also ==
- List of ghosts
- Lilla Anna och Långa farbrorn another books series by the same authors
