= Flee North =

2023 biography of Thomas Smallwood

- First edition cover
- Author: Scott Shane
- Language: English
- Publisher: Celadon Books
- Publication date: September 19, 2023
- ISBN: 9781250843210

Flee North: A Forgotten Hero and the Fight for Freedom in Slavery’s Borderland is a 2023 biography of Thomas Smallwood written by American journalist Scott Shane.

== Summary ==
Flee North is a biography of Thomas Smallwood (1801–1883), a man who helped hundreds of African Americans escape slavery via the Underground Railroad. The author, Scott Shane, makes the claim that Smallwood was the first to coin the term "underground railroad" in a letter published in 1842. (The origin of the term is disputed.)

Smallwood was born into slavery in Maryland, though his experience was uncommon. His slaver taught him to read and write, and allowed Smallwood to purchase his freedom when he turned 30. After gaining freedom, Smallwood worked as a shoemaker in Washington, D.C. and Baltimore. Smallwood eventually connected with Charles Torrey, a white abolitionist from New England, who aided in helping enslaved individuals escape to the northern United States. During this time, Smallwood also "wrote biting satirical articles for the newspapers in which he mocked the slave traders and slave catchers his charges eluded".

By the end of his life, Smallwood had to remain in Canada due to number of enemies he had made in the United States.

Kirkus Reviews highlighted how, "even in the abolitionist business, the erasure of Black participants is evident". Torrey also claimed "to have been the first to organize these mass escapes of enslaved people [...] and the history books remember him as a hero who died of tuberculosis while imprisoned after having finally been caught. Both Smallwood and Torrey merit remembrance and honor, for what they did was at the risk of their lives."

== Reception ==
"Flee North" has received starred reviews from Booklist, Library Journal, Publishers Weekly, and Shelf Awareness.

Shelf Awareness's Kristen Allen-Vogel wrote, "Using Smallwood's newspaper columns, his memoirs, and other contemporaneous documents, Shane builds a convincing case that history unjustly erased Smallwood and left the spotlight on Torrey alone. Readers will find this riveting account an excellent step toward restoring to Smallwood the place in public memory he richly deserves". Kirkus Reviews called Flee North "a lively, readable narrative" and highlighted how the book restores "a forgotten chapter in abolitionist history".

A. E. Siraki, writing for Booklist, called Shane's writing "engaging" and "dynamic", noting that it "will captivate readers who want to know how people like Smallwood succeeded in duping countless enslavers. The fascinating tale of a swashbuckling abolitionist and his white activist companion will make readers wish for a film adaptation."

Library Journal's Amy Lewontin called Flee North "an exceptionally well-written book that takes readers into the life and political development of Smallwood".

Simarily, Richard Kreitner, writing for The Washington Post, said the book "combin[es] the best elements of rigorously researched history and thrilling narrative". He went on to call it "a gripping story told at a brisk pace in the no-fuss prose of a practiced reporter", though he noted that "some of Shane’s more editorializing comments grate".

The Wall Street Journal's Fergus M. Bordewich highlighted how Flee North is "not a general history of the Underground Railroad. Mr. Shane says relatively little about the well-established network of underground activists [... It] stands on its own, however, as both a thrilling portrait of the underground in action and as an inspiring demonstration of the extraordinary personal courage and sacrifice that activists demanded of themselves".
