= Erika Krouse =

American novelist and short story writer (born 1969)

- Born: Erika Dawn Krouse; March 28, 1969 (age 57); Yonkers, New York, U.S.
- Education: Grinnell College (BA); University of Colorado (MA)
- Occupations: Author, novelist

Erika Dawn Krouse (born March 28, 1969) is an American novelist and short story writer. She is the author of three books of fiction, and her short stories have appeared in The New Yorker, The Atlantic, and literary magazines, including Ploughshares, Glimmer Train, and Story.

== Early life and education ==
Krouse was born in Yonkers, New York, and grew up on the East Coast and Tokyo. She graduated with a BA from Grinnell College in 1991, and earned an MA from the University of Colorado in 1996.

== Career ==
She began her writing career in poetry, and then switched to fiction because, as she said in an interview, "I was an awful poet."

Krouse's short story collection, Come Up and See Me Sometime, published by Scribner in 2001, won the Paterson Prize, was translated into six languages and was a New York Times Notable book of the year. In the New York Times Book Review critic Maria Russo described the collection as, "[leaving] us with a feeling of unbounded, exhilarating possibility."

Her debut novel, Contenders, was published in 2015 by Rare Bird Books.

Krouse served as a fiction judge for the 2005 Colorado Book Award and has reviewed for the New York Times Book Review. Her fiction and essays have appeared in numerous anthologies. Krouse currently lives in Boulder, Colorado, teaches fiction writing at the Lighthouse Writers Workshop, and works part-time as a private investigator.

== Awards and honors ==
- 2023 Edgar Award for Best Fact Crime for Tell Me Everything (2022)
- Amtrak Residency (2014–15).
- Paterson Fiction Prize (2001), for Come Up and See Me Sometime
- Tennessee Williams Scholarship in Fiction, Sewanee Writers' Conference (2000)
- Lauren Husted Scholarship in Fiction, Bread Loaf Writers' Conference (1999).
- Eve of St. Agnes Award, Negative Capability (1997)
- Ruth Underhill Award, Denver Women's Press Club (1997)

== Bibliography ==
- —— (2001). Come Up and See Me Sometime: Stories. New York: Scribner.
- —— (2015). Contenders. Rare Bird Books.
- —— (2022). Tell Me Everything: The Story of a Private Investigator. New York: Flatiron Books. ISBN 9781250240309.
- —— (2025). Save Me, Stranger: Stories. New York: Flatiron Books. ISBN 9781250240330.
