= Suzanne Sens =

French writer and teacher (1930–2023)

- Born: 15 September 1930; Le Genest-Saint-Isle, France
- Died: 13 February 2023 (aged 92)
- Occupations: Writer; Author; Teacher

Suzanne Sens (15 September 1930 – 13 February 2023) was a French writer, author, and teacher.

== Biography ==
Born in Le Genest-Saint-Isle on 15 September 1930, Sens worked as a teacher in numerous villages in Mayenne, including Laval. She was elected to the Académie du Maine in 2000.

Suzanne Sens died on 13 February 2023, at the age of 92.

== Works ==
=== Fiction ===
- Le Secret de madame Miesko
- Un drame sous l'Empire
- Je suis Mozart
- Le Chouan de Mortefontaine
- L'Été dans la Tourmente
- Les Compagnons
- Les Forgerons de la Malterre
- Les Contrebandiers du Sel
- Fils de Métèque
- Mémoires d'Hubert, écuyer de Janville
- Le Chant du Cygne
- Légendes et histoires vraies dans le Maine

=== Historical ===
- Les Parlers du Maine
- Voyage à travers l'histoire de la Mayenne
- L'histoire de la Mayenne racontée aux enfants

=== Biographies ===
- La Fontaine (1980)
- Chopin (1981)
- Découverte d'Érik Satie (1988)
- Alain Gerbault (1993)
