= Patrick French =

British writer and historian (1966–2023)

- Born: Patrick Rollo Basil French; 28 May 1966; Aldershot, England
- Died: 16 March 2023 (aged 56); London, England
- Education: University of Edinburgh (MA, PhD)
- Occupation: Historian
- Spouses: Abigail Ashton-Johnson (divorced); Meru Gokhale
- Children: 4
- Writing career
- Subjects: India; Nepal
- Notable work: The World Is What It Is (2008)
- Notable awards: National Book Critics Circle Award; Somerset Maugham Award; Hawthornden Prize

Patrick Rollo Basil French (28 May 1966 – 16 March 2023) was a British writer, historian and academician. He was the author of several books including: Younghusband: The Last Great Imperial Adventurer (1994), a biography of Francis Younghusband; The World Is What It Is (2008), an authorised biography of Nobel Laureate V. S. Naipaul that won the National Book Critics Circle Award in the United States; and India: A Portrait (2011).

During the 1992 general election, French was a Green Party candidate for Parliament. He sat on the executive committee of Free Tibet, a Tibet Support Group UK, and was a founding member of the inter-governmental India–UK Round Table.

== Life and career ==
Patrick Rollo Basil French was born in Aldershot, Hampshire, on 28 May 1966. He was raised in Warminster and attended Ampleforth College, before enrolling at the University of Edinburgh, where he studied English and American literature, received an MA in English literature, and went on to receive a PhD in South Asian studies. At the age of 25, French set off on a trail across Central Asia to retrace the steps of British explorer Francis Younghusband. This resulted in the publication of his first book, Younghusband: The Last Great Imperial Adventurer in 1994. The book went on to win both the Somerset Maugham Award and the Royal Society of Literature's W. H. Heinemann Prize.

French's next book, Liberty or Death: India's Journey to Independence and Division, was published in 1997 and earned the author accolades and brickbats in equal parts. It was described by some in the Indian media as presenting a "revisionist view" of Mahatma Gandhi and Mohammad Ali Jinnah's role in the Indian Independence movement, and there were a few calls to ban the book in India. On the other hand, Philip Ziegler hailed it as "a remarkable achievement", and Khushwant Singh described the author as "a first rate historian and storyteller". The book sold heavily due to the controversy and French was awarded the Sunday Times Young Author of the Year award for the book.

Published in 2003, Tibet, Tibet: A Personal History of a Lost Land was French's third book. According to the author's own account, his interest in Tibet was triggered by a meeting he had with the Dalai Lama when he was 16, but the book emerged from "a gradual nervousness that the western idea of Tibet, particularly the views of Tibet campaigners, was becoming too detached from the reality of what Tibet was like. So I did a long journey through Tibet in 1999." The Independent described the book as "intelligent as well as passionate in its approach". Pico Iyer in the Los Angeles Times book review described French as a "scrupulous and disciplined writer" who "has a decided gift for inspired and heartfelt research and a knack for coming upon overlooked details that are worth several volumes of analysis".

The World Is What It Is, French's authorised biography of the Nobel Prize–winning author V. S. Naipaul, was published in 2008. In The New York Review of Books, Ian Buruma described French as the inventor of a new genre, "the confessional biography". The book was selected by the editors of The New York Times Book Review as one of the "10 Best books of 2008". In 2008 The World Is What It Is was awarded the National Book Critics Circle Award in America, and was also shortlisted for the Samuel Johnson Prize. French was also awarded the Hawthornden Prize in 2009 for the book.

In 2011, French published India: A Portrait, described as "an intimate biography of 1.2 billion people". The book is a narrative of the social and economic revolutions that are transforming India. French also started an India-focused website called The India Site.

French was appointed the inaugural Dean of the School of Arts and Sciences at Ahmedabad University in 2017.

Before his death, French was working on the authorised biography of another Nobel laureate, Doris Lessing.

== Personal life ==
French and his first wife, Abigail Ashton-Johnson, had three children. Their marriage ended in divorce. He then married Meru Gokhale, and they had a son. Gokhale is a former editor-in-chief of Penguin Random House India and daughter of author and publisher Namita Gokhale.

In 2003, French was offered and declined appointment as Officer of the Order of the British Empire (OBE). He felt the order's motto, "For God and the Empire", would affect perceptions of his writing on South Asian history.

French died from cancer in London on 16 March 2023, aged 56.

== Bibliography ==
- Younghusband: The Last Great Imperial Adventurer (HarperCollins, 1994) ISBN 978-0-00215-733-9
- The Life of Henry Norman (Unicorn Press, 1995) ISBN 978-0-90629-013-2
- Liberty or Death: India’s Journey to Independence and Division (HarperCollins, 1997) ISBN 978-0-00255-771-9
- Tibet, Tibet: A Personal History of a Lost Land (HarperCollins, 2003) ISBN 978-0-00257-109-8
- The World Is What It Is: The Authorized Biography of V. S. Naipaul (Picador, 2008) ISBN 978-0-33043-350-1
- India: A Portrait (Allen Lane, 2011) ISBN 978-1-84614-214-7
