= Danila Comastri Montanari =

Italian writer (1948–2023)

Danila Comastri Montanari (4 November 1948 – 28 July 2023) was an Italian historical mystery fiction writer. She wrote the Publius Aurelius Statius series.

== Biography ==
Graduated in pedagogy and political sciences, for twenty years she has been teaching and continuing to make regular trips.

In 1990 she wrote her first novel, Mors Tua and then devoted herself full time to the narrative, favouring the genre of historical mystery, which allowed her to reconcile her main interests: the study of the past (in particular ancient civilizations) and the love for mystery weaves.

Starting from 1990, she wrote historical detective stories focused on the figure of Publius Aurelius Statius, senator in the Rome of Claudius. 19 of her novels were published.

In addition to the Statius series, Comastri Montanari penned other novels and short stories set in different historical periods. In February 2007 she published the essay Giallo antico. How to write a historical detective story, published by Hobby & Work; the appendix contains the stories Pirates of the Chersonese, Assassination at the temple of Vesta and Il giallo del serpente.

Danila Comastri Montanari died on 28 July 2023, at the age of 74.

== Bibliography ==
=== Publius Aurelius series ===
- 1990 – Mors tua
- 1991 – In corpore sano
- 1993 – Cave canem
- 1994 – Morituri te salutant
- 1996 – Parce sepulto
- 1997 – Cui prodest?
- 1999 – Spes ultima dea
- 2000 – Scelera
- 2001 – Gallia est
- 2002 – Saturnalia
- 2003 – Ars moriendi – Un'indagine a Pompei
- 2004 – Olympia – Un'indagine ai giochi ellenici
- 2005 – Tenebrae
- 2007 – Nemesis
- 2009 – Dura Lex
- 2011 – Tabula Rasa
- 2013 – Pallida Mors
- 2015 - Saxa rubra
- 2017 - Ludus in fabula

=== Standalone novels ===
- 1995 – Ricette per un delitto
- 1996 – La campana dell'arciprete
- 1997 – Il panno di Mastro Gervaso
- 1999 – Una strada giallo sangue
- 2003 – Istigazione a delinquere
- 2008 – Terrore
