= The Mirrors of Fire =

1992 Arabic novel by Ḥaidar Ḥaidar

The Mirrors of Fire (Maraya An-Nar)
- Author: Ḥaidar Ḥaidar
- Language: Arabic
- Genre: Fictional Novel
- Published: 1992
- Publisher: Al-Ward Publishing
- Publication place: Damascus, Syria
- Pages: 126

The Mirrors of Fire (Arabic: مرايا النار, romanized: Maraya An-Nar) is the 1992 novel by the Syrian writer Ḥaidar Ḥaidar. The novel is stylistically unfamiliar to Arabic literature in general, for the novel does not confine itself to the conventions of Arabic literature. Additionally, the novel navigates controversial topics related to politics and society.

== Summary ==
The novel has two storylines, both following the main character ‘Naji Al-Abdullah.’ The first storyline follows ‘Naji’ on the train as he travels to an African city. It follows the events that occur on the train, like the children dying in their mother's arms. The second storyline follows Naji's recollection of an event that happened to him some twenty years back when he was running away from the Lebanese Civil War to Morocco. The past and present clash in the novel, allowing the two storylines to merge into one. Through Naji and the events in the story, the novel discusses many relevant topics including politics, the persistent fear and anxiety in Arab societies, and exile.

=== Main characters ===
- Naji Al-Abdullah
- Omniscient narrator
- Dumyana
- Abdel-Rahman, Dumyana's husband

== Reception ==
Ḥaidar Ḥaidar was famously known for employing stream-of-consciousness techniques in his novels. This technique is what set his texts apart from other Arabic literary texts published at the time. Therefore, he was accused of copying western writers, like James Joyce and Virginia Woolf, in his use of the stream-of-consciousness style. However, the literary critic and doctor Radwan Al-Qadbani denied these claims and stated that Ḥaidar Ḥaidar developed the stream-of-consciousness style in a way that is unique to him and his writings. This development could be noted in his four novels: The Desolate Time (Az-Zaman Al-Muwḥesh), A Feast for the Seaweeds (Walimah li A'ashab al-Bahr), The Mirrors of Fire (Maraya An-Nar), and The Suns of Gypsies (Shumous al-Ghajar). Dr. Qadbani also added that employing stream-of-consciousness enabled Ḥaidar Ḥaidar to prioritize the characters’ thoughts and inner machinations over external events.
