= Alain Lacouchie =

French poet, illustrator, and photographer (1946–2023)

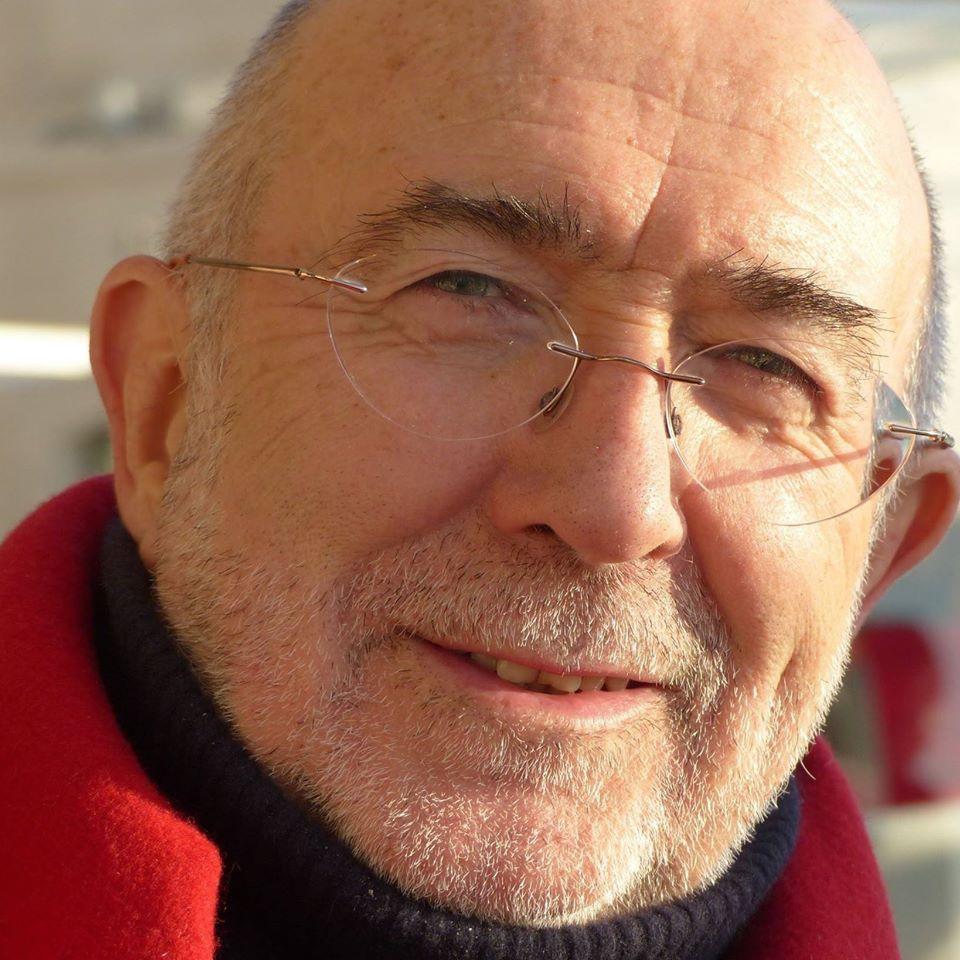
- Lacouchie in 2017
- Born: 28 May 1946; Limoges, France
- Died: 3 February 2023 (aged 76); Limoges, France
- Occupations: Poet; Illustrator; Photographer

Alain Lacouchie (28 May 1946 – 3 February 2023) was a French poet, illustrator, and photographer. He wrote numerous collections of poetry, many of which he also illustrated.

== Biography ==
Born in Limoges on 28 May 1946, Lacouchie worked as a poet, visual artist, and photographer. He also worked as an English teacher in Haute-Vienne and Creuse. He was rebellious by nature and was passionate about photography, travel, and history, particularly that of Limousin. Writer Laurent Bourdelas dedicated a chapter of his book, Du Pays et de l'exil - Un Abécédaire de la littérature du Limousin, to Lacouchie, as well as several pages in Histoire de Limoges.

Lacouchie was very active in the world of poetry, collaborated with several poetry magazines, namely Friches. He was a member of the Association Fondencre and was president of the Centre d'action poétique. He was secretary of the publishing house Le Vert Sacré in Angoulême, led by Jean-Claude Valin. He was a member of the board of directors of the Center régional du livre en Limousin and organized an event around poetry at the Bibliothèque francophone multimédia de Limoges twice a year. In 2021, he was invited to the editorial board of the magazine Poésie Première.

Alain Lacouchie died in Limoges on 3 February 2023, at the age of 76.

== Publications ==
=== Poetry ===
- Familières (1970)
- Les Rapaces, images en prose (1992)
- Mes aujourd'huis clos (1995)
- Instants bien que mal (1997)
- Il ou l'autre (1998)
- Under H. et Bombe Poèmes (1999)
- Melliflue (1999)
- Lui ou moi (1999)
- Ils, et à suivre… (1999)
- Rimages et magie (2000)
- Friable ou ronde, la vie (2000)
- Natures mortes à deux voix (2001)
- Entrouvert entrevu (2001)
- D'éclats et d'oublis (2001)
- À perte d'ailleurs
- Violons d'elles (2002)
- S'apaiser, anonyme (2002)
- Non-identifié, autoportrait (2002)
- En trompe-l'œil, carnet de nous (2002)
- Spécial Alain Lacouchie (2003)
- Florence, en tous sens (2003)
- Dérives et des routes, éphéméride (2003)
- Petits jours à mains nues (2004)
- Jules de JR., Histoires à délirer debout (2005)
- Impasse et manque; sans roi (2005)
- Banal, comme d'un pigeon (2005)
- De temps à l'autre, incertain (2007)
- Debout, malgré tout (2008)
- Plus légers que le temps ? (2009)
- Les Radieux (2009)
- Écorché vif et cris (2009)
- Butiner la vie (2011)
- Aux quatre vents (2012)
- Tous les hommes s'appellent Icare (2014)
- Citations à débordement (2015)
- Les hirondelles sont mortes au printemps (2016)
- Aux hasards d’une voix (2016)
- Nue d’une nuit au creux de ma main (2017)
- Ginette Cendrillon était une danseuse nue (2017)
- C’est le rat qui rit le dernier (2017)
- Bulles de rêves où je ne dors pas (2018)
- Encres à la mer (2018)
- L’œil trop bleu du poisson mort (2018)
- Une pierre sans personne (2019)
- La lassitude n'est pas une fuite (2020)
- Apatride des espaces (2020)
- Histoires sans têtes (2020)
- La révolte s'achève et le feu hésite encore (2021)
- Araignée est une pape (2021)
- Tentation d'un toujours (2022)

=== Collective works ===
- Charentes, j’écris ton nom (1996)
- Anthologie des poètes limousins - 12 poètes, 12 voix(es) (1997)
- Mille poètes, mille poèmes brefs (1997)
- A lasting calm (1997)
- C’est-à-dire (2000)
- Anthologie de l’haïku en France (2003)
- Intervention à Haute Voix (2017)
