= Oh God, the Sun Goes =

2023 novel by David Connor

- Author: David Connor
- Illustrator: Beste M. Dogan
- Publication date: August 1, 2023
- ISBN: 978-1-68589-062-9

Oh God, the Sun Goes is a 2023 novel by David Connor. The novel, Connor's debut, is set in a world where the Sun has gone missing and follows a man who searches for it in the Southwestern United States.

== Plot ==
The Sun has disappeared from the sky, leaving behind a spot of gray in the sky. A man sits in a diner and observes a couple dancing to "Ain't No Sunshine" by Bill Withers before leaving. Before getting into his car, a waiter hands him a letter that he had left behind, from "M." The man travels across Arizona in search of the Sun. As he follows a set of clues, he enters an alternate-reality version of Phoenix called "The Mind." The man eventually finds and meets "M," who is revealed to be a former lover who wants the man to move on from his past. The man, whose name is revealed to be "H.A.," drives to Zion National Park where he watches the Sun return to the sky.

== Development history ==
Connor first wrote Oh God, the Sun Goes as a short story before expanding it into a full-fledged novel. Connor, who works as a research assistant at the Lady Davis Institute for Medical Research, makes reference to neuroscience throughout the novel. Connor drew inspiration from several authors in developing the novel, citing Italo Calvino, Amos Tutuola, and Haruki Murakami as influences.

=== Publication history ===
Oh God, the Sun Goes was published by Melville House on August 1, 2023.

== Reception ==
Oh God, the Sun Goes received mostly positive reception from critics. The Los Angeles Review of Books praised Connor's prose, writing that "his language is as precise as it is divergent." The review also directed praise at the novel's structure and at the surrealistic landscape of the book. The Chicago Review of Books was similarly positive, saying that the book had a "strange and compelling" story and describing the writing as being multi-layered. Foreword also praised the novel, describing it as "dazzling" and "fabulistic." Jonah Raskin, writing in CounterPunch, said that the novel's character's were unique and that there was an underlying humor in the protagonist's interactions with them. The Millions praised Connor's ambition in writing the novel, writing that it embodied a post-COVID feeling of isolation and comparing it to Sarah Rose Etter's novel Ripe.

Publishers Weekly was mostly positive, praising the novel's extended metaphor and Connor's prose while noting that the narrative felt strained due to the book's length. The Financial Times and SFBook were more mixed, with the former positively comparing Connor's prose to J. G. Ballard but both concluding that the novel would be polarizing for readers. A mostly positive review in the Washington Independent Review of Books reached a similar conclusion, praising the plot for being open to interpretation but noting that it took the reviewer two readings to fully appreciate the novel. Locus published a critical review, saying that while the novel was intellectually challenging, the surrealistic prose led to a disconnected emotional core.
