= Ahmed Ilias =

Bangladeshi poet (1934–2023)

- احمد الیاس
- Born: 25 August 1934; Taltola, Calcutta, Bengal Presidency, British India (now West Bengal, India)
- Died: 7 July 2023 (aged 88); Dhaka, Bangladesh
- Occupation: Poet

Ahmed Ilias (25 August 1934 – 7 July 2023) was a Bangladeshi Urdu poet of Bihari origin. His ancestors came from Munger in Bihar.

== Early life ==
Ilias was born in the Taltola area of Calcutta on 25 August 1934. His mother died in childbirth, and he was raised by Muslim neighbours from East Bengal. His adoptive father worked at Kidderpore port. Ilias studied at the Calcutta Alia Madrasah. He continued his studies till age 15, when the partition of India caused him to pause his education due to lack of funds. He resumed years later in Islamia High School in Calcutta. He fell ill before his SSC exams, and lacking the means for treatment, he moved to live with relatives in East Pakistan in 1953. He came to the provincial capital of Dacca, where he passed his school certificate exams and became a trainee surveyor for the Pakistani government. He travelled across Bangladesh for his job.

== Career ==
Ilias joined the Dhaka Press Club, where he was soon appointed secretary.

Ilias began to take an interest in writing. His circle of friends included journalists, poets, and writers. He became a journalist. In 1964, communal riots drove more Indian Muslims, from Jamshedpur and Rourkela, to East Pakistan. Ilias covered their plight as a reporter. In 1971, as the Liberation War led to the creation of an independent Bangladesh, Urdu speakers such as Ilias lost their rights and their livelihoods.

Although representing a marginalized, even vilified, language, Ilias gained recognition as a writer of Urdu poetry. His work has been translated into Bengali. He wrote a book called Biharis: The Indian Emigres in Bangladesh: An Objective Analysis (2003) which was translated into Bengali.

== Social work ==
Ilias led the Al-Falah NGO which works with Urdu speakers who live in various camps in Bangladesh to help them integrate into mainstream society.

== Personal life ==
Ilias had nine children, three sons and six daughters. He died in Dhaka on 7 July 2023, at the age of 88.
