= Russell H. Greenan =

American novelist (1925–2023)

- Born: Russell Henry Greenan; September 17, 1925
- Died: July 22, 2023 (aged 97); Providence, Rhode Island, U.S.
- Education: Long Island University
- Occupation: Author
- Spouse: Flora Bratko Greenan
- Children: 3
- Website: www.russellhgreenan.info

Russell Henry Greenan (September 17, 1925 – July 22, 2023) was an American author with an established readership in the United States and Europe, particularly France. His first book It Happened in Boston? was reprinted in 2003 in the US as a 20th Century Rediscovery by Modern Library. His fourth book The Secret Life of Algernon Pendleton was made into a motion picture titled The Secret Life of Algernon in 1997.

== Background ==
Greenan grew up in the Bronx, had a tour of duty in the US Navy, and after attending Long Island University on the G.I. Bill, went to live in Boston in the early 1950s. For several years he worked as a traveling salesman selling industrial machine parts in remote corners of New England. His savings enabled him to travel to Nice, France, where he stayed for a year to write. On his return to Boston he married Flora Bratko and opened an antique shop in Harvard Square naming it The Cat and Racquet after the story by Honoré de Balzac.The business was short-lived, but the experience provided an abundance of material for his subsequent career as a writer. In 1966, by then aged 40, he left his job as a ball bearing sales manager and traveled with his wife and three children to return to Nice with the intention of taking a year to finish a novel. This work was eventually published by Random House in 1968 titled It Happened in Boston? to significant acclaim.

Greenan maintained his career as an author by dividing his time between Europe and the US and concentrating exclusively on writing novel-length works. His fiction appeared in a magazine on only one occasion, when an excerpt from his sixth book The Bric-a-Brac Man featured in Playboy along with Alex Haley's book Roots. To date ten novels by Russell H. Greenan have been published in the US and France. Over 40 different editions of these novels have appeared in five languages.

Russell H. Greenan died in Providence, Rhode Island, on July 22, 2023, at the age of 97.

== Work ==
Greenan established a reputation as an inventive novelist working within the genre of crime fiction. His second novel Nightmare (1970 USA) was followed by The Queen of America (1972 USA), The Secret Life of Algernon Pendleton (1973 USA), Heart of Gold (1975 USA), The Bric-a-brac Man (1976 USA), Keepers (1979 USA), Can of Worms (1987 USA), Doomsnight (1991 France) and Glamour Doom (2002 France). Greenan's work has appeared in several anthologies both in English and French. Amongst these is the version of The Bric-a-Brac Man in the Detective Book Club series 3 Thrillers in 1.

The novels are plot-driven stories where a central character is drawn inexorably into a predicament that exposes the brittleness of human equanimity and the delusion of self-determination. The structure of a Greenan story hinges, as in ancient Greek tragedy, on a reversal of fortune as likely to be caused by a fatal mistake or 'hamartia' as by a flaw of character. However, Greenan plays with the idea of the flawed character and is known for creating protagonists who appear to have lost a normal relationship with reality but whose motives impress the reader as being reasonable and even judicious. As the story progresses and the characters' fates become clear, the result is as likely to be comedy as tragedy.

The author secures his readers’ trust by grounding extraordinary events in settings described in verifiable detail, often including street names of actual locations in which the author lived. The predominant setting is Boston, Massachusetts, including Cambridge and Brookline, where all the stories except Keepers and Nightmare take place. Rhode Island is the backdrop to Keepers, and Nightmare is set in New York City. Carefully researched references to antiques, art history, literature and classical history are also an important element in the novels’ construction as are the detailed descriptions of domestic chores or eating. Into this solidly founded realism Greenan introduces the flourishes of imagination – often assisted by puns and word play – that have prompted critics to describe the works variously as ‘macabre’, ‘exuberant’, ‘gore’, ‘endearing’ or simply ‘extravaganzas’.

=== It Happened in Boston? ===
It Happened in Boston? is the most widely published of Greenan's novels. The book is a richly detailed story narrated by a singularly brilliant artist with a passion for Old Master techniques who develops an obsession to seek divine justice through an encounter with God. From its first appearance in 1968 in the United States the book has since been printed in a further 12 different editions including translations into Dutch, German, Spanish, French and Italian. The most recent edition is being published by Diogenes Verlag in Zürich in 2010. The Modern Library- 20th Century Rediscoveries edition published by Random House in 2003 includes an introduction by Jonathan Lethem and an afterword by the author reflecting on the novel's origins in his own childhood and the reasons for its continued appeal decades after the first printing.

=== Critical reception ===
Russell H. Greenan's work was regularly reviewed in the New York Times by critics such as Newgate Callender and Christopher Lehmann-Haupt. Other writers include David Rowbotham writing in The Courier-Mail, Anne Tyler in the Washington Post, David L. Ulin in Bookforum and Peter S. Prescott in Look magazine.

Anne Tyler selected It Happened in Boston? for her contribution to a series of articles titled Rediscoveries that appeared in Book World, the reviews section of The Washington Post, concluding that the book had “the power to reawaken our sense of life's possibilities.” At the time the book was out of print, but as a result of her article, Bantam Books brought out a new paperback version simultaneously with The Secret Life of Algernon Pendleton and the first edition of A Can of Worms. All of these featured distinctive cover illustrations by the artist Stephen Hall.

The crime writer Lawrence Block includes references to Greenan's novels in several manuals that he has written on the craft of fiction writing. Telling Lies for Fun & Profit: A Manual for Fiction Writers and Writing the Novel: From Plot to Print.

==== Literary style ====
I get the feeling that through some oversight or taxonomical confusion (Mr. Greenan's books are difficult to classify, therefore hard to explain) not enough readers are aware of what delightful fun he is poking at the notion that human beings are superior to skunk cabbages.

Greenan's work explored the parameters of crime fiction and was often described as macabre. While for a time he was a member of Mystery Writers of America, his stories did not fall regularly into the genre of mystery fiction. On occasion the novels were actively marketed as horror fiction, for example when Nightmare was subtitled A Contemporary Tale of Horror and Queen of America was introduced as “Meet Miss Psycho. She's the shock experience of your life.” on the cover a US paperback. But while all of Greenan's work depict murderous acts, the publishers' use of the label horror contradicted reviewers’ characterization of the author's oeuvre as charming gothic fiction However these works were also consistently praised as black comedy.

A recurring theme raised by reviewers is the difficulty of categorizing this author's work. In his study titled The Birth of Death and Other Comedies: The novels of Russell H. Greenan, the writer Tom Whalen draws widely on American literary tradition as he finds a niche for Greenan's output.

“Crime fiction then? In that crimes occur, especially murders, though his novels shed this genre's conventions faster than the best of them, Hammett, say, or Cain, Goodis, Bardin, Thompson, Highsmith, or Himes.”

“He descends from the romance tradition of Hawthorne and Poe, where allegory and dream mingle with and illuminate realism.”

Notwithstanding the prevalence of “The doppelgänger, the trickster, the psychotic and the jokester” who populate these works, Whalen's search for underlying themes draws out consistent Catholic references to demonstrate how Greenan's writing can be usefully considered as theological fiction.

In the house of fiction, theological narratives reside in a special room (upstairs, back) decorated in Gothic realism where metafiction may sleep with fantasy, because God, as Ludwig Feuerbach proposed in Das Wesen des Christentums (1841), is always and only a concept, though regrettably turned by most humans into hard logic-defying fact. From these premises theological fictions rise. At this level of abstraction, one that posits a participative Deity, fantasy often partakes of madness. Either it's me that's mad, Greenan's characters say, or it's the world.

The papers of Russell H. Greenan including manuscripts and correspondence are in the John Hay Library at Brown University, Providence, Rhode Island and in the Howard Gotlieb Archival Research Center in Boston University.

==== France ====
Foreign language editions of Greenan's It Happened in Boston? began to be published in 1970, with Dutch and Italian editions coming out that year. However Greenan's novels found their most consistent foreign language readers in France the only country to have published the full extent of his work. Since 1971 when Nightmare was published as L'Oeil dans la place new editions have been brought out by a broad range of publishers, the first being Éditions Gallimard where L’Oeil dans la Place, La Reine d’Amerique (Queen of America) and Je Vais Faire Un Malheur (Keepers) were produced as paperbacks in the fr:Série noire collection. Further editions of C'est Arrivé à Boston? (It Happened in Boston?), Un Coeur en Or Massif (Heart of Gold), La Vie Secrète de Algernon Pendleton (The Secret Life of Algernon Pendleton), Bric-à-Braque (Bric-a-Brac Man) and Sombres Crapules (A Can of Worms) were published by Livre de Poche and fr:Rivages/Noir.

Further editions published by independent presses like Murder Inc and Crapule Production include the first editions of La Nuit du Jugement Dernier (Doomsnight) and Magique MicMac (Glamour Doom). The work has been translated by Marie-Françoise Husson, Jean-Paul Gratias, Roger Guerbet, Simone Hilling, Nathalie Godard, Aurélie Tronchet and others.

Greenan's continued popularity in France is notable and he has remarked that, "The French, though they are open to a very broad range of writing, have a particular passion for noir, so these dark stories appeal to them. IHIB?, my first book, was not the first to be printed there. It was the fifth."

The author has cited his early literary influences as Honoré de Balzac's La Comédie Humaine and the work of Louis Ferdinand Céline. Whalen observes that “Greenan is more immediately entertaining than Céline, whose work he acknowledged as an influence, and at the same time just as dark, if not more so; a certain sneer sometimes creeps into Céline's prose, but never into Greenan's.”

=== Cover art ===
The illustrators commissioned to create original work for the book jacket designs produced a distinct range of images clearly inspired by the stories. These include the darkly comical visions of Stephen Hall whose covers appeared in the Bantam Books editions of The Secret Life of Algernon Pendleton, It Happened in Boston? and A Can of Worms. The unique fold out covers of the Crapule Production editions printed in France featured illustrations by the renowned Henri Galeronfr:Henri Galeron. The Random House editions included original work by Stan Zagorowski, Paul Bacon, Ken Braren, Ted DeBosier. The cover of the Mondadori edition of It Happened in Boston? reproduces the painting “Oedipus Rex“’’ (1922) by Max Ernst while the recent reprint by SchirmerGraf features a detail of “Sweet Bird of Youth” (2005) by the Scottish artist Jack Vettriano.

=== Film adaptation ===
The Secret Life of Algernon Pendleton was made into a film titled The Secret Life of Algernon (1997) starring John Cullum, who co-wrote the screenplay and played the part of Algernon opposite Carrie-Anne Moss playing Madge Clerisy. It won The Best of the Fest award for Comedy for the director Charles Jarrott at Breckinridge Festival of Film in 1998 and was nominated Best TV Movie and Best Original Music Score at the Gemini Awards in 2001.

== Bibliography ==
Novels

- It Happened in Boston? New York: Random House, 1968
- Nightmare New York: Random House, 1970
- The Queen of America New York: Random House, 1972 ISBN 0-394-47208-X
- The Secret Life of Algernon Pendleton New York: Random House, 1973 ISBN 0-394-48283-2
- Heart of Gold New York: Random House, 1975 ISBN 0-394-49495-4
- The Bric-a-Brac Man New York: Random House, 1976 ISBN 0-394-40829-2
- Keepers New York: St Martin's Press, 1978 ISBN 0-312-45106-7
- A Can of Worms New York: Bantam Books, 1987 ISBN 0-553-26575-X
- La nuit du jugement dernier tr. Marie-Françoise Husson Paris: Crapule Production, 1990 ISBN 2-906310-65-4
- Magique MicMac tr. Aurélie Tronchet, Paris: Murder Inc., 2002 ISBN 2-913636-26-8
- Dread of Night London: Daemonax Books, 2009 ISBN 978-0-9563860-0-7
- Nether Netherland London: Daemonax Books, 2013
