= Eugene Kozlovsky =

Russian writer (1946–2023)

- Евгений Козловский
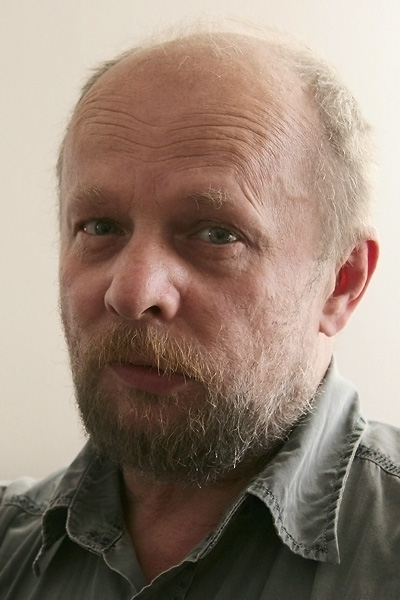
- Kozlovsky in 2006
- Born: 6 September 1946; Vladivostok, Russian SFSR, Soviet Union
- Died: 15 May 2023 (aged 76); Moscow, Russia

Yevgeniy Antonovich Kozlovsky (Russian: Евгений Антонович Козловский; 6 September 1946 – 15 May 2023) was a Russian writer, journalist, theatre director and film director.

== Biography ==
Kozlovsky died in Moscow on 15 May 2023, at the age of 76.

== Bibliography ==
=== Tales ===
- Moskvaburgskiye povesti / Tales of Moscowburg
  - 1980 — Dissident i chinovnitsa / Dissident and Bureaucrat Woman (a story about real event)
  - 1980 — Malen'ky bely golub' mira / The Small White Dove of Peace (a story with unbelievable conclusion)
  - 1980—1981 — K'gasnaya ploschad' / 'Ged Square (a tale with two murders)
  - 1982—1983 — Vodovozov i syn / Vodovozov and Son (a tale of departure)
  - 1983 — Shanel' / Chanel (a tale about end of the beautiful age told on behalf of photographer)
  - 1984 — Golos Ameriki / Voice of America (a sci-fi epilogue)

=== Plays ===
- Dushny teatr / Stuffy Theatre (a book of six plays)
  - Vera. Nadezhda. Lyubov' (a play in three acts)
    - 1981 — Video / The Video (a comic play in one act)
    - 1984 — Boks / The Box (a folklore melodrama in one act)
    - 1987 — Pulya / The Bullet (a farce in one act)
  - Moguschestvo Rossii / Might of Russia (a dramatic trilogy)
    - 1987 — Ruf' / Ruth (a comedy from the past times)
    - 1986 — Mesto rozhdeniya ili Perehod po zebre / Place of Birth or Passage On "Zebra" (a tragedy without catharsis)
    - 1987 — Mnogo kostey ili Veter P. / Many Bones or The P. Wind (a detective drama in two acts)

=== Novel ===
- 1974–1979, 1986 — My vstretilis' v rayu... / We've Met In Paradise...

=== Film scripts ===
- 1988 — Kvartira / The Flat (a sentimental story happened at the edge of the Empire on the eve of its destruction)
- 1990 — Kak zhivete?.. / How Do You Live?.. (an incest story)
- 1990 — Guvernantka / The Governess (a story about two prostitutes)
- 1990—1991 — Ya obeschala, i ya uydu... / I Promised, So I'll Go Away (a story of love and death)
- 1991—1992 — Chetyre lista fanery / Four Sheets Of Plywood (a story of a private investigation)
- 1992 — Grekh / The Sin (a story of the passion)

=== Poems ===
- 1985 — Ole v al'bom / Into Olga's Album (the fourth book of poems)
