= Georges Banu =

Romanian-born French writer and theatre critic (1943–2023)

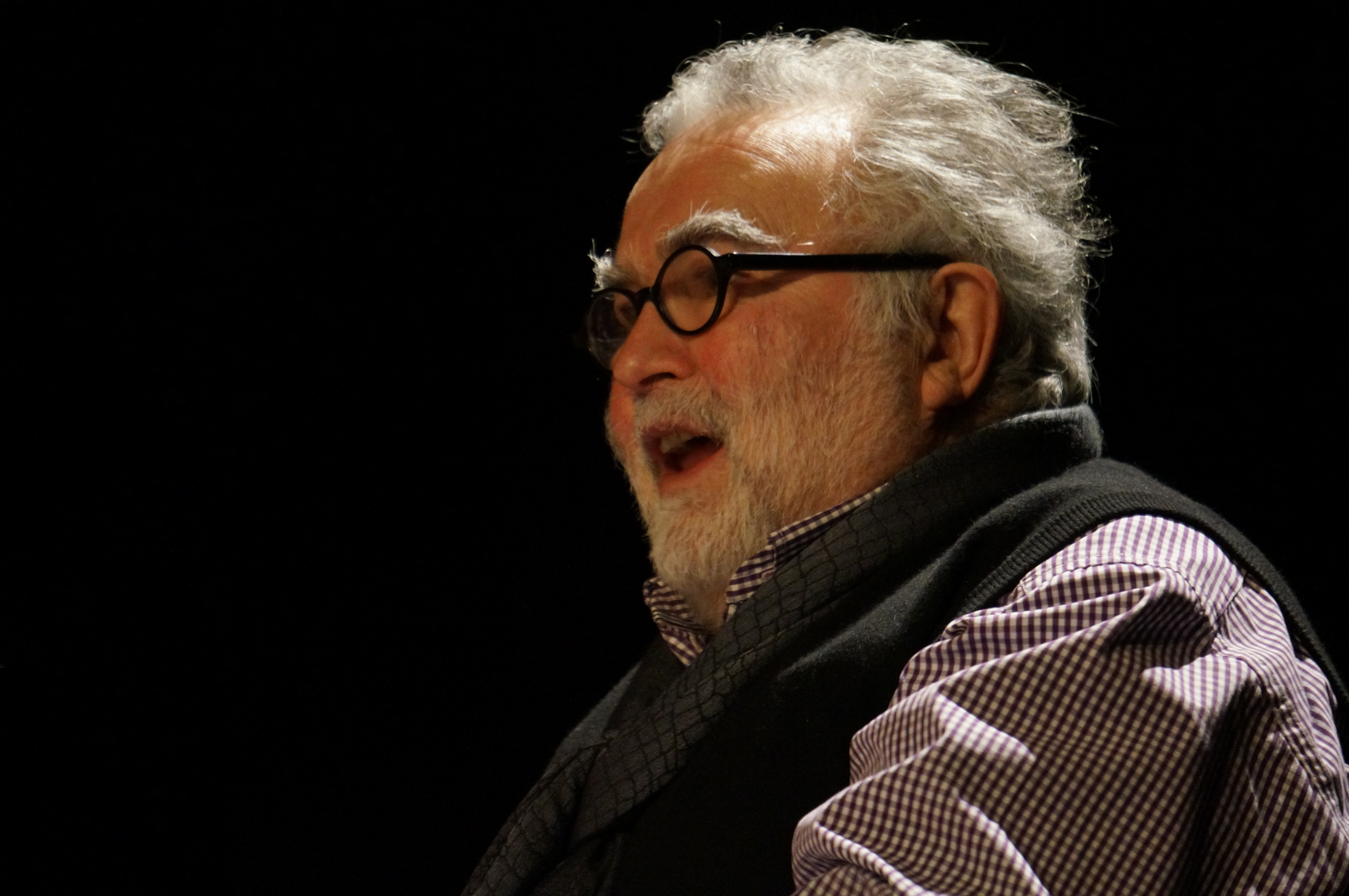
- Banu in 2015
- Born: 22 June 1943; Buzău, Romania
- Died: 21 January 2023 (aged 79); Paris, France
- Education: Caragiale National University of Theatre and Film
- Occupations: Writer; Theatre critic Professor

Georges Banu (22 June 1943 – 21 January 2023) was a Romanian-born French writer, theatre critic, and academic.

== Biography ==
Born in Buzău on 22 June 1943, Banu studied at the Caragiale National University of Theatre and Film. He moved to France in 1973 and became a professor at Sorbonne Nouvelle University Paris 3. He began writing essays on theatre and was notably the author of Théâtre sortie de secours, L'Acteur qui ne revient pas, Notre théâtre, La Cerisaie, L'Homme de dos, and Peter Brook. Vers un théâtre premier.

Banu subsequently became a professor of theatre at the Université catholique de Louvain and was president of the Association internationale des critiques de théâtre from 1994 to 2000.

Since 1989, he has collaborated with the Europe Theatre Prize, editing several volumes containing conference proceedings, testimonials on the profiles and works of the award winners, and the proceedings of the event's collateral initiatives. Since then he has held several conferences in each edition of the Prize, starting with the one on Peter Brook culminated in the dialogue between Brook and Jerzy Grotowski, which took place in May 1989 in Taormina. Over the years he became a central figure of the Prize, collaborating, among others, with Renzo Tian, Franco Quadri, Michael Billington, and the general secretary Alessandro Martinez. In 1996 he joined the Prize's Board of Directors, assuming the presidency in 2011. He has been a permanent member of the Prize Jury since 1997, becoming its President in 2016, a position he held until his death.

In 1990, he founded the Académie expérimentale des théâtres, which ceased operations in 2001, alongside Michelle Kokosowski. He was co-director of the magazine Alternatives théâtrales and director of the Actes Sud collection "Le temps du théâtre".

Banu died on 21 January 2023, at the age of 79.

== Publications ==
- Bertolt Brecht ou Le petit contre le grand (1981)
- Le Théâtre, sortie de secours (1984)
- L'acteur qui ne revient pas: journées de théâtre au Japon (1986)
- Mémoires du théâtre (1987)
- Le Rouge et l'Or, une poétique du théâtre à l'italienne (1989)
- Gli anni di Peter Brook. L'opera di un maestro raccontata al Premio Europa per il teatro (1990)
- Peter Brook: de Timon d'Athènes à Hamlet (1991)
- Le Rideau ou La fêlure du monde (1997)
- Avec Brecht (1999)
- Notre Théâtre. La Cerisaie (1999)
- Les Cités du théâtre d'art: de Stanislavski à Strehler (2000)
- L'Homme de dos (2000)
- Exercices d'accompagnement: d'Antoine Vitez à Sarah Bernhardt (2002)
- Yannis Kokkos: le scénographe et le héron (2004)
- La Nuit nécessaire (2004)
- La voie de Peter Brook - Peter Brook's journey (2004)
- Les répétitions: de Stanislavski à aujourd'hui (2005)
- L'Oubli (2005)
- Nocturnes: peindre la nuit, jouer dans le noir (2005)
- La Scène surveillée (2006)
- Miniatures théoriques (2008)
- Shakespeare, le monde est une scène: métaphores et pratiques théâtrales (2009)
- Le Repos (2009)
- Des murs... au Mur (2009)
- Patrice Chéreau, J'y arriverai un jour, in «Le Temps du théâtre» (2009)
- Shakespeare: métaphores et pratiques du théâtre (2010)
- Les Voyages du comédien (2012)
- Amour et désamour du théâtre (2013)
- La porte au cœur de l'intime (2015)
- Les Récits d'Horatio: portraits et aveux des maîtres du théâtre européen (2021)
