= It Happened in Boston? =

1968 novel by Russell H. Greenan

- Author: Russell H. Greenan
- Language: English
- Publication date: 1968

It Happened in Boston? (1968) is a novel by Russell H. Greenan. It tells the story of an unreliable narrator, who is a disillusioned, paranoid painter, whose goal in life is to someday meet God and destroy him. He decided he wanted to hold God accountable for the evils in the world. The book follows a bizarre series of events in the lives of him and his painter friends and effectively documents his descent into paranoid delusions as he becomes more and more unreliable as a narrator leaving the reader to become more and more unsure about what exactly is happening in Boston.

The narrator goes on "reveries" in a public garden in which he transports himself to historical places and events. Although he has no name, he tells a young boy named Randolph several different names over the course of the book. The book is a web of his relationships and delusions and has a lot to say about the nature of art and madness. The storyline is interspersed with reveries, accounts of paranoia, and memories of his art education and friends.
