= Robert Sauzet =

French historian (1927–2023)

Director of the Centre for Advanced Renaissance Studies
- In office 1985–1991
- Preceded by: Jean Lafond
- Succeeded by: Jean-Michel Vaccaro

Personal details
- Born: December 1927 Saint-Hippolyte-du-Fort, France
- Died: 12 February 2023 (aged 95)
- Education: Lycée de garçons de Nîmes; University of Montpellier
- Occupation: Historian

Robert Sauzet (25 December 1927 – 12 February 2023) was a French historian.

== Biography ==
Born in Saint-Hippolyte-du-Fort on 25 December 1927, Sauzet spent his childhood in Saint-Martial. After his secondary school studies at the Lycée de garçons de Nîmes, he earned a degree in history from the University of Montpellier in 1955. In 1976, he defended his doctoral thesis, titled Contre-Réforme et Réforme catholique en Bas-Languedoc : le diocèse de Nîmes au xviie siècle.

Sauzet became a professor of history at the University of Tours and served as director of the Centre for Advanced Renaissance Studies from 1985 to 1991. He was elected a non-resident member of the Académie de Nîmes in 1994. In 2017, he received the Médaille du Club cévenol.

After his marriage to Madeleine Bouillie, he had three sons, including linguist Patrick Sauzet. Robert Sauzet died on 12 February 2023, at the age of 95.

== Works ==
- Les Visites pastorales dans le diocèse de Chartres pendant la première moitié du xviie siècle : essai de sociologie religieuse (1975)
- Contre-Réforme et Réforme catholique en Bas-Languedoc : le diocèse de Nîmes au xviie siècle (1979)
- Les Réformes : enracinement socio-culture (1982)
- Pratiques et discours alimentaires à la Renaissance (1982)
- Les Frontières religieuses en Europe du xve au xviie siècle (1992)
- Henri III et son temps (1992)
- Chroniques des frères ennemis : catholiques et protestants à Nîmes du xvie au xviiie siècle (1992)
- Les Réguliers mendiants acteurs du changement religieux dans le royaume de France (1480-1560) (1994)
- Chrétiens et musulmans à la Renaissance (1998)
- Le Notaire et son roi : Étienne Borrelly (1633-1718), un Nîmois sous Louis XIV (1998)
- Les Cévennes catholiques : histoire d'une fidélité (xvie-xxe siècles) (2002)
- Il governo della città: modelli e pratiche (secoli XIII-XVIII) (2004)
- Au Grand Siècle des âmes : guerre sainte et paix chrétienne en France au xviie siècle (2007)
- La Ville à la Renaissance : espaces, représentations, pouvoirs (2008)
- Religion et société à l'époque moderne : itinéraire de Chartres au val de Loire (2012)
