= Tibet, Tibet (book) =

2003 book by Patrick French

Tibet, Tibet: A Personal History of a Lost Land
- Author: Patrick French
- Language: English
- Subject: History
- Genre: non-fiction
- Published: 2003
- Publisher: HarperCollins Publishers
- Publication place: United Kingdom
- Media type: Hardcover
- Pages: 333
- ISBN: 978-0-002-571098
- OCLC: 660519371

Tibet, Tibet: A Personal History of a Lost Land is a history book plus a travel memoir by Patrick French.

== Overview ==
The book is an outcome of Patrick French's twenty years involvement with Tibetan people. Instead of the peaceful country that most people in the West think of, he finds a country with a long history of war and a complicated relationship with China. Most of all, he looks at how the recent history of Tibet has changed people's lives. He meets both people who were hurt and benefited by Mao Zedong's Cultural Revolution, as well as young nuns who are still waging an underground fight against the Communist regime.

== Reception ==
Writing for the India Today, S Prasannarajan writes, "Tibet, Tibetis travels in ransacked memories and nervous realism, a passage through the wreckage of a bad history, and, most tellingly, it is a personal testament of faith and doubt, an inquiry free of spiritual mawkishness leave that to the designer castaways from the West-and Shangri-La Lost lamentations."

Justin Wintle in his review at The Independent writes, "Tibet, Tibet is uneven in several ways. It attempts an impersonal account of Tibet while ballooning personal adventures. It is both a travel book and recycled history, and its tenor changes. One problem is that French wants the limited time he has spent in Tibet to count for as much as possible. Of the book's two parts, the first is admirably ruminative, while the second at times devolves into an anti-Maoist rant."

In a review for The Tibet Journal, Alex McKay writes, "It is a very personal account, as well as a history and a travelogue in the Patrick French style. As such, it draws a response from the reader, and thus it engages. It is a readable book, the character sketches and descriptions are economical and believable. It will be widely read in the West, and as such, its effect may be quite large. But it is worth asking whether Tibetans will read this book, or whether its critique will merely annoy them. It will almost certainly do the latter, but it will be worth their while for them to read to it, if only to argue against it."

Editors at IndraStra Global write, "Throughout the book, French wrote with clarity, empathy, and a deep sense of respect for the people and culture of Tibet. He skillfully weaved personal anecdotes, historical context, and political analysis to create a rich and engaging narrative that appeals to anyone interested in Tibet, its people, and its future."
