= Number Go Up =

2023 non-fiction book by Zeke Faux

Number Go Up: Inside Crypto's Wild Rise and Staggering Fall
- First edition cover
- Author: Zeke Faux
- Language: English
- Publisher: Currency
- Publication date: September 12, 2023
- ISBN: 978-0-593-44381-1

Number Go Up: Inside Crypto's Wild Rise and Staggering Fall is a 2023 book by the investigative journalist Zeke Faux which takes a critical look at the world of cryptocurrency. The book discusses crypto-related topics including Sam Bankman-Fried and the 2022 collapse of cryptocurrency exchange FTX, Razzlekhan, and pig butchering scams.

The book was on the best books of 2023 lists of many major publications including Wired, the Washington Post, the Los Angeles Times, and the Financial Times.

Faux explained that the title of the book was inspired by something he heard during a conference he was attending, "[it was] something I heard a Bitcoin guy say...and he was like, if the price goes up, it gets people excited. The more people will buy, then the price will go up more. And before you know it, like to the moon. And I thought that was kind of laughable. But I really think that's kind of what's been happening these last couple of years."

== See also ==
- Going Infinite – another book about Bankman-Fried and FTX
