= Lilla Anna och Långa farbrorn =

Little Anna and the Tall Uncle
- Author: Inger & Lasse Sandberg
- Original title: Lilla Anna och Långa farbrorn
- Country: Sweden
- Language: Swedish
- Genre: children
- Published: 1964-

Little Anna and the Tall Uncle (Swedish: Lilla Anna och Långa farbrorn) is a children's book series written by Inger & Lasse Sandberg. The first book was published in 1964. The main characters are Anna, a little girl, and Långa farbrorn, a tall man.

== Books ==
- 1964 - Vad Anna fick se
- 1965 - Lilla Anna och trollerihatten
- 1965 - Vad lilla Anna sparade på
- 1966 - Lilla Annas mamma fyller år
- 1966 - När lilla Anna var förkyld
- 1971 - Lilla Anna och långa farbrorn på havet
- 1972 - Lilla Annas julklapp
- 1972 - Var är lilla Annas hund?
- 1973 - Lilla Anna flyttar saker
- 1973 - Lilla Anna leker med bollar
- 1973 - Lilla Anna - kom och hjälp
- 1975 - Lilla Anna i glada skolan
- 1976 - Var är långa farbrorns hatt
- 1979 - Lilla Anna och de mystiska fröna
- 1982 - Lilla Anna reser till landet mittemot
- 1987 - Lilla Anna räddar Oskar
- 1990 - Grattis lilla Anna (compilation volume with Vad Anna fick se, Lilla Anna och trollerihatten and Lilla Annas mamma fyller år)
- 2008 - Lilla Anna och lilla Långa farbrorn

== See also ==
- The Little Ghost Godfrey
