= Zeke Faux =

American investigative journalist and author

Zeke Faux is an American journalist and author. He is an investigative reporter for Bloomberg News. He is a national fellow at New America.

Faux has a BA in history from Cornell University.

In 2019, Faux received the Gerald Loeb Award (explanatory business reporting) and the Silver Gavel Award (fostering public understanding of the law) for the 2018 Bloomberg News investigative series "Sign Here to Lose Everything". The reports exposed how predatory lenders deprived borrowers of due-process rights. He was a finalist with Zachary R. Mider for the 2019 National Magazine Award.

In 2023, Faux published the book Number Go Up, a critical examination of the world of cryptocurrency.
