= A Feast for the Seaweeds =

1983 novel by Syrian novelist Haidar Haidar

A Feast for the Seaweeds (Walimah li A'ashab al-Bahr)
- Author: Ḥaidar Ḥaidar
- Language: Arabic
- Genre: Fictional Novel
- Published: 1983
- Publisher: Al-Ward Publishing
- Publication place: Syria
- Pages: 380

A Feast for the Seaweeds (Arabic: وليمة لأعشاب البحر, romanized: Walimah li A'ashab al-Bahr) is a 1983 novel by the Syrian novelist Ḥaidar Ḥaidar. The novel centers on an Iraqi communist revolutionary as he runs away to Algeria, where he meets an old revolutionary during the revolution's collapse. It also follows the havoc faced by revolutionaries in Algeria.

== Reception ==
The Egyptian poet and scholar Jābir Qumayḥah published a book titled A Feast for the Seaweeds According to Islam, Reason, and Literature (Riwayit Walimah li A'ashab al-Bahr Fi Mizan Al-Islam Wal ʿAql Wal Adab) where he studies Ḥaidar's novel and looks at the parts that cross Islam's boundaries or the boundaries of appropriate speech and expression.

A Feast for the Seaweeds rong republished in Egypt in 2000, seventeen years after its original publication date, and it was considered to be "an offense to Islam" by Al-Azhar. The novel was subsequently banned in Egypt.

== See also ==
- List of books banned by Egypt
