= The Country of the Blind: A Memoir at the End of Sight =

2023 memoir by Andrew Leland

- First edition cover (pub. Penguin Press)
- Author: Andrew Leland
- Language: English
- Publisher: Penguin Press
- Publication date: July 18, 2023
- ISBN: 9781984881427

The Country of the Blind: A Memoir at the End of Sight is a 2023 memoir by Andrew Leland.

Leland has retinitis pigmentosa, which means that although he grew up sighted, but as a teenager, he began losing his vision. At the time of the memoir, Leland's vision is described as though he is seeing through a narrow tube. Eventually, he will be completely blind. The memoir navigates Leland's journey of vision loss, as well as the language, politics, and customs surrounding it.

== Reception ==
In a starred review, Publishers Weekly wrote, "At the core of [Leland's] inquiry are the paradoxes of disability: how does one understand blindness as both an impairment and a 'neutral characteristic,' and how can Leland accept his 'new identity' as both central and incidental? Enriched by its sparkling prose, this is an extraordinary and intellectually rigorous account of adapting to change."

Library Journal's Catherine Lantz called the book, "informative and engaging" and recommended it for "readers who like to be entertained as they broaden their awareness of disability and others’ lives."

The Guardian's Kate Womersley said the memoir

articulates beautifully, with energy and honesty, how being held between seeing and blindness has changed him and his views on our ableist world ... Though Leland is accused occasionally by friends of 'over-intellectualising' his situation, his fine sensibility, lucid writing and dignified treatment of his subject feels anything but indulgent. This book invites us all to rethink what it means to desire, to read, to be independent, to sit with uncertainty and to assume a new identity. Leland models how we might accept inevitable changes in our faculties as we age with tempered apprehension, humour and interest.

Laura Miller, writing for Slate, called Leland "a fluid, thoughtful writer", noting that his writing is "more cerebral than sensual [...] The sweet spots in The Country of the Blind—and there are lots of them—come when his efforts to comprehend something intellectually tips him over into unexpected emotion".

In a similar vein, Kirkus Reviews said the book is "emotional but never sentimental" and highlighted how "Leland provides both fascinating capsule histories of the topics he’s pondering [...] and searching glimpses into his own existential struggle to understand what it means for him to be blind."

Alexandra Jacobs, writing for The New York Times, similarly stated that the book is "far from a feel-good family chronicle". Jacobs further highlighted how "Leland rigorously explores the disability’s most troubling corners", noting that readers "will look at the English language differently".

Publishers Weekly included The Country of the Blind in their list of the top ten books of 2023.
