= Frédéric Barbier (historian) =

French historian and research director (1952–2023)

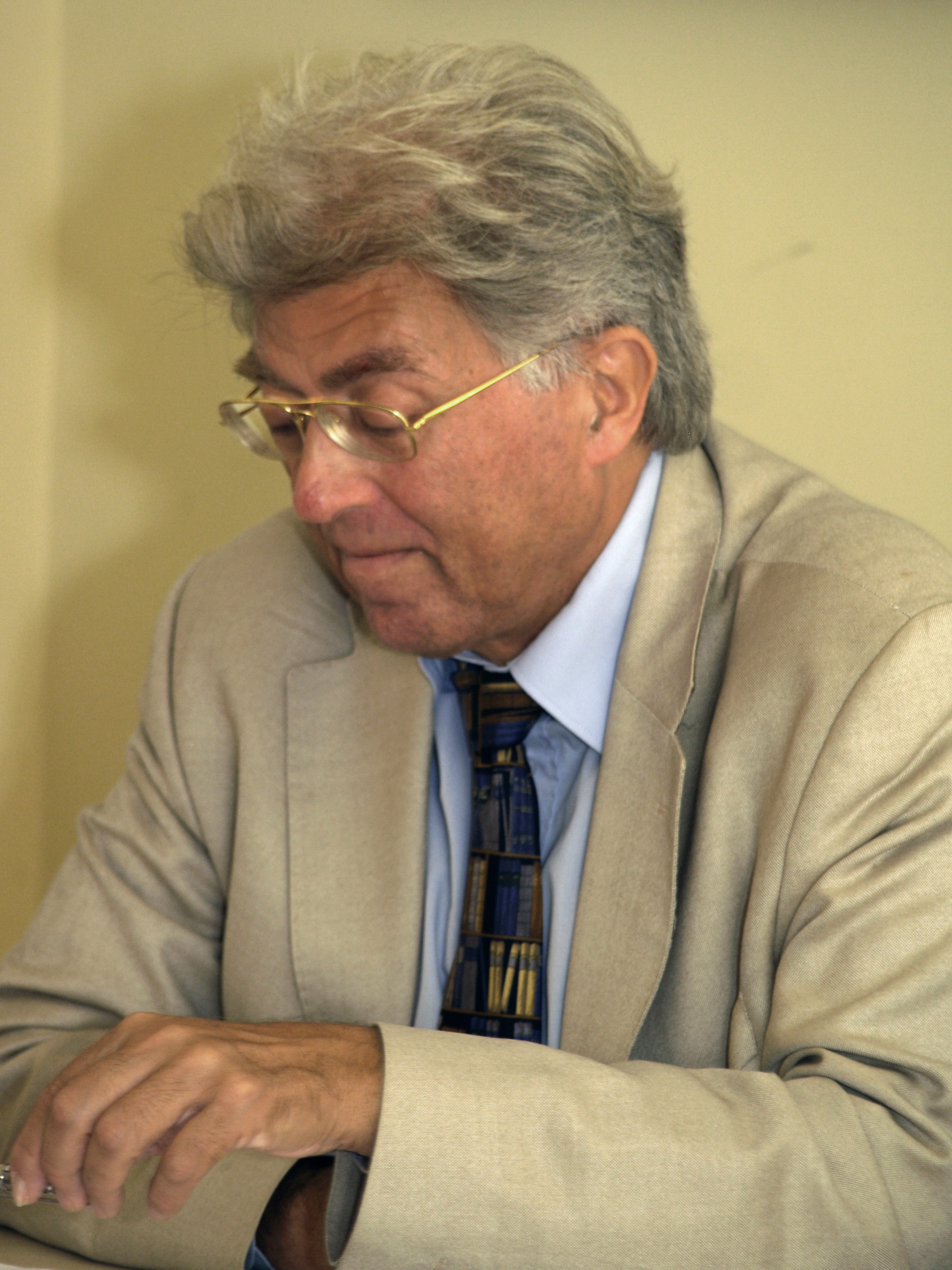
- Barbier in 2011
- Born: 27 August 1952; Chatou, France
- Died: 28 May 2023 (aged 70); Rueil-Malmaison, France
- Education: Lycée Charlemagne
- Alma mater: École Nationale des Chartes
- Occupation: Historian

Frédéric Barbier (27 August 1952 – 28 May 2023) was a French historian and research director at Centre national de la recherche scientifique. Barbier was born on 27 August 1952, and died on 28 May 2023, at the age of 70.

== Biography ==
A graduate of the École Nationale des Chartes, he served as curator at the Valenciennes Municipal Library. He taught at the National Center for Scientific Research and the École pratique des hautes études. The author of numerous books, he was a member of the editorial board of the Revue française d'histoire du livre and served as editor-in-chief of the journal Histoire et civilisation du livre .

== Selected publications ==
- 1678, Valenciennes devient française, catalogue d’exposition, Valenciennes : Bibliothèque municipale, 1978
- L'Art de la reliure à travers les collections valenciennoises, Valenciennes : Bibliothèque municipale, 1978
- Valenciennes, de la Réforme au Baroque (1559-1600), Valenciennes : Bibliothèque municipale, 1979
- Trois cents ans de librairie et d'imprimerie : Berger-Levrault (1676-1830), Genève : Droz, 1979
- Douze siècles d'art du livre : trésors de la bibliothèque de Valenciennes, Valenciennes : Bibliothèque municipale, 1980
- L'Image du Monde : cartes, atlas et livres de voyage (XV^{e}-XVIII^{e} siècles), Valenciennes : Bibliothèque municipale, 1981
- Les Débuts du livre imprimé : éditions du XV^{e} siècle conservées dans les bibliothèques de la région Nord-Pas-de-Calais, Hénin-Beaumont : Association des bibliothécaires français, Groupe Nord, 1982
- Le Patronat du Nord sous le Second Empire : une approche prosopographique, Genève : Droz, 1989
- Finance et politique : la dynastie des Fould : XVIII^{e}-XX^{e} siècle, Paris : A. Colin, 1991
- L'Empire du livre : le livre imprimé et la construction de l'Allemagne contemporaine (1815-1914), Paris : éd. du Cerf, 1995
- L'Europe et le Livre : réseaux et pratiques du négoce de librairie (XVI^{e}-XIX^{e} siècles), Paris : Klincksieck, 1996 (codirector)
- with Catherine Bertho-Lavenir, Histoire des médias, de Diderot à Internet, Paris : A. Colin, 1996.
- Histoire du livre, Paris : A. Colin, 2000 (2^{e} éd. 2006)
- Lumières du Nord : imprimeurs, libraires et « gens du livre » dans le Nord au XVIII^{e} siècle (1701-1789) : dictionnaire prosopographique, Genève : Droz, 2002
- Le Berceau du livre, autour des incunables : études et essais offerts au professeur Pierre Aquilon par ses élèves, ses collègues et ses amis, numéro thématique de la Revue française d'histoire du livre, 121, 2003 (dir.)
- Des moulins à papier aux bibliothèques, en 2 volumes : Le Livre dans la France méridionale et l'Europe méditerranéenne (XVI^{e}-XX^{e} siècles) , Montpellier : Université Paul Valery, 2003
- Est-Ouest : transferts et réceptions dans le monde du livre en Europe, 17^{e}-20^{e} siècles, Paris : Msh Paris, 2005
- L'Europe de Gutenberg : le livre et l'invention de la modernité occidentale (XIII^{e}-XVI^{e} siècle), Paris : Belin, 2006
- (dir.), Paris capitale des livres : le monde des livres et de la presse à Paris, du Moyen Âge au XX^{e} siècle, catalogue de l'exposition, Paris : Paris bibliothèques, 2007
- with Sabine Juratic et Annick Mellerio, Dictionnaire des imprimeurs, libraires et gens du livre à Paris, 1701-1789, Genève : Droz, 2007-…
- Le Rêve grec de monsieur de Choiseul : les voyages d'un Européen des Lumières, Paris : A. Colin, 2010
- Histoire des bibliothèques : d'Alexandrie aux bibliothèques virtuelles, Paris : A. Colin, collection "U-Histoire", 2013.
