= The Desolate Time =

1973 Arabic novel by Ḥaidar Ḥaidar

Az-Zaman Al-Muwḥesh (The Desolate Time)
- Author: Ḥaidar Ḥaidar
- Language: Arabic
- Genre: Novel
- Published: 1973
- Publisher: Dar Al-ʿAwda Publishing
- Publication place: Beirut, Lebanon

The Desolate Time (Arabic: الزمن الموحش, romanized: Az-Zaman Al-Muwḥesh) is a 1973 novel by Syrian writer Ḥaidar Ḥaidar. It ranks 7th in the best 100 Arabic Novels list.

== Summary ==
The novel was categorized as a stream-of-consciousness style novel after the defeat of the Six-Day war in 1967. The cultured characters in the novel reject tradition and embrace looking at the present in the light of the future, and they represent the secular stance. The story is narrated in first-person. The protagonist uses stream-of-consciousness techniques to narrate the story through recollections and dreams of her experiences and the experiences of her comrades among the loitering and loss they live through, swinging between ideological theorizing, alcohol, and women.

== Editions ==
- First Edition: 1973, Dar Al-ʿAwda Publishing, Beirut
- Second Edition: 1979, Arab Institute for Research & Publishing, Beirut
- Third Edition: 1991, Dar ʾAmwaj Publisher, Beirut
- Fifth Edition: 2000, Dar ʾAmwaj Publisher, Beirut
