= 2023 in Italy =

- Decades: 2000s; 2010s; 2020s; 2030s
- See also: History of Italy; Timeline of Italian history; List of years in Italy

The following is a list of events from the year 2023 in Italy.

== Incumbents ==
- President: Sergio Mattarella
- Prime Minister: Giorgia Meloni

== Events ==
=== January ===
- 1 January
  - A peace concert is organized in Rome.
  - 180 people - including 50 minors - are injured around the country by firecrackers during New Year celebrations.
  - In Rome, an Israeli girl is stabbed at Termini station.
  - The municipality of Moransengo-Tonengo is created with the merger of Moransengo and Tonengo.
  - The municipality of Bardello con Malgesso e Bregano is created with the merger of Bardello, Malgesso and Bregano
- 2 January
  - In Rome the Last Generation environmental group vandalizes Palazzo Madama. Three people are arrested.
  - The health card of Denise Pipitone, an italian child disappeared in 2004, is issued and delivered to the parents.
- 4 January – The historic Vecchia Milano pastry shop in the center of Milan closes after 50 years of service.
- 5 January – In Somma Vesuviana (municipality in the province of Naples) 90 fines are imposed in two days due to occupation of the area available only for the disabled.
- 6 January – In Arezzo, Tuscany, a man tries to demolish a house after an argument with a man, killing the same man with a gunshot.
- 8 January – Clash on the A1 highway of Arezzo between ultras from Roma and Naples.
- 14 January
  - The political party European Liberal Democrats is founded.
  - Starbucks open its first store in Campania in the city of Marcianise (CE).
  - A woman is killed by her ex-partner outside a restaurant near Rome.
- 16 January – Mafia boss Matteo Messina Denaro, one of the most wanted men in Italy and Europe, is arrested in Palermo, Sicily, after 30 years on the run.

=== February ===
- 7–11 February – Sanremo Music Festival 2023
- 12–13 February
  - 2023 Lazio regional election
  - 2023 Lombard regional election
- 17 February – A public transport strike takes place in Rome.
- 18 February – A neo-fascist group attacks the students of a high school in Florence with kicks and punches.
- 21 February – Most Italian voice actors go on strike following a lack of protection and salary increases, and the use of their voices by artificial intelligences without permission. This generates unease among fans who are waiting for the series dubbed into Italian.
- 26 February
  - 2023 Democratic Party leadership election
  - 2023 Calabria migrant boat disaster: At least 60 people are killed and 80 others are rescued after a boat carrying migrants capsizes in rough seas off the southern coast of Calabria.

=== March ===
- 9 March – In Viterbo neo-Nazi banners are displayed with insults to the new secretary of the Democratic Party Elly Schlein.
- 31 March – Italy's Data Protection Authority blocks ChatGPT for allegedly breaching data protection rules and failing to verify that its users are at least 13 years old.

=== April ===
- 2–3 April – 2023 Friuli-Venezia Giulia regional election
- 7 April – Italy’s national birth rate falls to its lowest level on record since 1861, with fewer than 400,000 births in 2022.
- 19 April – Francesco Lollobrigida, Minister of Agriculture, makes a speech to a trade union conference suggesting that "Italians are having fewer children, so we're replacing them with someone else. [We say] yes to helping births, no to ethnic replacement. That’s not the way forward." Responding to his statement opposition politicians cited references to Italian fascist rhetoric of the 1930s. News reports set his remarks in the wider context of the racist Great Replacement theory.

=== May ===
- 2023 Emilia-Romagna floods
- 14–15 May – 2023 Italian local elections
- 21 May – Members of the Last Generation activist group pour charcoal into the Trevi Fountain in Rome, turning the water black.
- 27 May – Murder of Giulia Tramontano
- 28 May – Lake Maggiore boat incident

=== June ===
- 12 June – Italian businessman and former Prime Minister Silvio Berlusconi dies at the age of 86.
- 14 June – 2023 Pylos migrant boat disaster
- 25–26 June – 2023 Molise regional election

=== July ===
- 12 July – A man is acquitted of assault as grope lasted less than 10 seconds. According to the judge, what happened “does not constitute a crime” because it lasted less than 10 seconds. The ruling has caused an uproar, with people posting videos on social media simulating groping.

=== August ===
- 12 August – Italian police recover 266 antiques from the Greek, Roman and Etruscan periods, worth tens of millions of Euros, from the United States.
- 31 August – Five people are killed and two more hospitalized when a passenger train collides with track workers doing maintenance work in Brandizzo, Piedmont.

=== September ===
- 13 September
  - Boats carrying roughly 7,000 migrants—more than the total population of Lampedusa—arrive on the island within the span of 24 hours.
  - Three people are killed and several others are injured in an explosion at a factory in Chieti, Abruzzo. A similar explosion at the factory in 2020 killed three workers.
- 16 September – A military plane crashes near Turin, Piedmont, killing a 5-year-old child and injuring four people, including the pilot.

=== October ===
- 3 October – 2023 Italy bus crash
- 20 October – Italian Prime Minister Giorgia Meloni tells the Cairo Peace Summit the international community must avoid an escalation in the war in Gaza and set a roadmap towards a two-state solution.
- 22 October – 2023 Trentino-Alto Adige/Südtirol provincial elections
- 29 October – The United Nations High Commissioner for Refugees reports that nine migrants died in the Mediterranean Sea while heading to Italy from North Africa, with five of the bodies found on the coast of Sicily and four of the bodies recovered by the non-governmental organization Sea-Eye.

=== November ===
- 2 November
  - Italian Prime Minister Giorgia Meloni stated that European leaders are tired of the war in Ukraine and want to broker a deal with the Kremlin, saying that “we need a way out” during a phone call in which she thought she was talking with a senior African Union official, but was actually speaking to Russian comedians Vovan and Lexus.
  - Five people are killed during heavy rains in the region of Tuscany, with rivers flooding and causing damage. Several roads and highways are closed amid landslides. Severe damage also occurred in Campobasso, Molise, evacuations are being made in Veneto with highways being closed, and emergency calls occurred in Rome. In Sardinia, strong winds fueled fires that burned hectares of vegetation, while a man is killed in Capoterra, and in Tortolì an entire sawmill burned down.
- 17 November – Italy becomes the first country to ban Cultured meat. The Parliament voted for the bill by 159 votes to 53.

=== December ===
- 17 December – Canadian musician David Foster holds a concert at Piazza San Marco in Venice, Italy.

== Deaths ==
=== January ===
- 1 January – Mario Artali, 84, businessman and politician, deputy (1972–1976).
- 2 January – Massimo Turci, 92, voice actor.
- 3 January – Giorgio Tombesi, 96, politician, deputy (1976–1983).
- 4 January – Heinrich Oberleiter, 81, South Tyrolean separatis.
- 5 January
  - Giorgio Otranto, 82, historian.
  - Ernesto Castano, 83, footballer (Triestina, Juventus, national team).
- 6 January
  - Gervasio Gestori, 86, Roman Catholic prelate, bishop of San Benedetto del Tronto-Ripatransone-Montalto (1996–2013).
  - Gianluca Vialli, 58, footballer (Sampdoria, national team) and manager (Chelsea).
  - Renzo Sacco, 78, politician, president of the Province of Padua (1995–1998).
  - Victoria de Stefano, 82, Italian-Venezuelan novelist.
- 7 January
  - Tony Pantano, 74, Italian-born Australian singer and entertainer.
  - Gian Pietro Testa, 86, writer, journalist and poet.
- 10 January – Gaudenzio Bernasconi, 90, footballer (Atalanta, Sampdoria, national team).
- 11 January – Antonio Muratore, 95, politician, senator (1983–1994).
- 12 January
  - Biagio Conte, 59, missionary.
  - Vittorio Garatti, 95, architect.
- 14 January – Gianfranco Baruchello, 98, painter.
- 16 January – Gina Lollobrigida, 95, actress (Bread, Love and Dreams, Come September, The Hunchback of Notre Dame).
- 17 January
  - Gino Landi, 89, choreographer and television and theatre director.
  - Nicola Molè, 91, lawyer and politician, president of the Province of Terni (1995–1999).
  - Nicola Zamboni, 79, sculptor.
- 18 January – Cesare Veneziani, 89, politician, mayor of Bergamo (1999–2004).
- 21 January – Pino Roveredo, 68, writer.
- 22 January
  - Gianfranco Goberti, 83, painter.
  - Mario Pupella, 77, actor (Angela, Salvo, Padrenostro) and theater director.
- 23 January – Patrizio Billio, 48, footballer (Crystal Palace, Ancona, Dundee).
- 24 January – Benito Bollati, 96, lawyer and politician, deputy (1974–1979).
- 27 January – Pietro Forquet, 97, bridge player.
- 28 January – Carlo Tavecchio, 79, football executive, president of the FIGC (2014–2017).
- 29 January – Vito Chimenti, 69, football player (Matera, Palermo, Taranto) and manager.
- 31 January – Luigi Pasinetti, 92, economist.

=== February ===
- 1 February – Renato Benaglia, 84, football player (Fiorentina, Catania, Roma) and coach.
- 2 February
  - Enzo Carra, 79, journalist and politician, deputy (2001–2013)
  - Monica Comegna, 43, actress (South Kensington).
- 3 February
  - Sergio Solli, 78, actor (Il mistero di Bellavista, I Can Quit Whenever I Want, Ciao, Professore!).
  - Dante Stefani, 95, partisan and politician, senator (1979–1987).
  - Giuseppina Bersani, 73, Olympic fencer (1972).
- 4 February
  - Luciano Armani, 82, racing cyclist.
  - Elettra Deiana, 81, teacher and politician, deputy (2001–2008).
- 5 February – Renato Del Ponte, 78, essayist.
- 6 February – Nicolò Mineo, 89, literary critic, literary historian and philologist.
- 7 February
  - Alfredo Rizzo, 89, Olympic runner (1960).
  - Pio D'Emilia, 68, journalist (il manifesto, L'Espresso).
- 8 February – Elena Fanchini, 37, Olympic alpine ski racer (2006, 2010, 2014).
- 9 February – Piero Montanari, 76, composer and bassist.
- 10 February – Giovanni Bettini, 84, architect and politician, deputy (1979–1983).
- 15 February
  - Dario Penne, 84, actor (E le stelle stanno a guardare) and voice actor.
  - Leone Manti, 79, politician, deputy (1992–1994).
  - Giampiero Neri, 95, poet.
- 16 February
  - Alberto Radius, 80, guitarist and singer-songwriter (Formula 3).
  - Giorgio Ruffolo, 96, politician, MP (1983–1994) and minister of the environment (1987–1992).
  - Mario Vitti, 96, Italian philologist.
  - Mario Zurlini, 80, Italian football player (Napoli, F.C. Matera) and coach (Savoia).
- 17 February – Maurizio Scaparro, 91, stage director.
- 18 February – Ilario Castagner, 82, football player and manager (Perugia, Milan, Inter Milan).
- 23 February – Giuseppe Nirta, 82, mobster.
- 24 February – Maurizio Costanzo, 84, television host, journalist, and screenwriter (The House with Laughing Windows, A Special Day, Zeder).
- 26 February – Curzio Maltese, 63, journalist (la Repubblica, La Gazzetta dello Sport) and politician, MEP (2014–2019).

=== March ===
- 5 March – Piero Gilardi, 80, visual artist.
- 6 March – Mario Telò, 72, political scientist and researcher.
- 15 March – Pierluigi Concutelli, 78, neofascist terrorist and bank robber.
- 21 March – Francesco Maselli, 92, film director and screenwriter.
- 22 March – Lucy Salani, 98, activist and the only known Italian transgender person to have survived the Nazi concentration camps.
- 26 March – Ivano Marescotti, 77, actor and theatre director.

=== April ===
- 2 April – Luigi Raffin, 86, footballer.
- 3 April – Nico Cirasola, 71, film director, screenwriter and actor.
- 5 April – Sergio Gori, 77, footballer.
- 9 April – Ettore Fiorini, 89, physicist.
- 12 April – Ambra Danon, 75, costume designer.
- 13 April – Julia Ituma, 18, volleyball player.
- 14 April
  - Enore Boscolo, 93, footballer.
  - Luigi Mele, 85, racing cyclist.
- 15 April – Mario Fratti, 95, playwright.
- 17 April – Virgilio Tosi, 97, documentary filmmaker.
- 19 April – Federico Salvatore, 63, singer-songwriter and comedian.
- 21 April
  - Mirella Giai, 93, politician and senator.
  - Sergio Rendine, 68, composer and cultural manager.
- 26 April – Stefano Gentili, 65, politician.
- 27 April – Giovanni Lombardo Radice, 67, actor.
- 28 April
  - Andrea Augello, 62, politician and senator.
  - Sergio Ottolina, 80, Olympic sprinter.

=== May ===
- 2 May
  - Guido Sacconi, 74, politician, MEP (1999–2009).
  - Giovanni Urbinati, 76, Italian ceramist and sculptor.
- 3 May – Alessandro D'Alatri, 68, film director (Red American, No Skin, The Fever), screenwriter and actor.
- 6 May – Pietro Barucci, 100, architect and urban planner.
- 7 May – Filippo Ottoni, 84, film director, screenwriter (Detective School Dropouts, A Bay of Blood, Jonah Who Lived in the Whale) and dubbing director.
- 8 May – Benito Pavoni, 86, politician, deputy (1987–1992).
- 10 May
  - Massimo Cavezzali, 73, comic book artist.
  - Virginia von Fürstenberg, 48, artist, poet and fashion designer.
  - Gioacchino Lanza Tomasi, 89, musicologist.
  - Enrico Oldoini, 77, film director (Don Matteo, Vacanze di Natale '90, Anni 90) and screenwriter.
- 13 May – Giotto Bizzarrini, 96, automobile engineer.
- 17 May – Chiara Moretti, 67, actress.
- 20 May – Sante Ranucci, 89, racing cyclist.
- 26 May – Roberto Cicciomessere, 76, politician.
- 28 May – Isa Barzizza, 93, actress.
- 30 May – Paolo Portoghesi, 91, architect.
- 31 May – Luca Di Fulvio, 66, writer and playwright.

=== June ===
- 2 June – Achille Ottaviani, 72, journalist and politician.
- 4 June
  - Luciana Lagorara, 86, Olympic gymnast.
  - Luigi Marrucci, 78, Roman Catholic prelate.
- 7 June
  - Marino Busdachin, 66, human rights activist.
  - Irma Capece Minutolo, 87, operatic singer and actress (Neapolitans in Milan, Young Toscanini).
- 8 June
  - Guido Bodrato, 90, politician.
  - Renato Longo, 85, Hall of Fame cyclo-cross racer.
- 10 June – Nuccio Ordine, 64, literary scholar and philosopher.
- 12 June
  - Silvio Berlusconi, 86, media tycoon and politician, Prime Minister (1994–1995, 2001–2006, 2008–2011).
  - Francesco Nuti, 68, film director (Stregati, The Pool Hustlers), actor (West of Paperino), and comedian.
- 14 June – Raimondo Crociani, 77, film editor (A Special Day, We All Loved Each Other So Much, Le Bal).
- 20 June – Paolo Zavallone, 90, singer and composer.

=== July ===
- 5 July – Walkiria Terradura, 99, partisan.
- 6 July – Arnaldo Forlani, 97, politician, prime minister (1980–1981).
- 19 July – Andrea Purgatori, 70, journalist (Corriere della Sera), screenwriter (The Rubber Wall, The Entrepreneur), and actor.
- 29 July – Vittorio Prodi, 86, politician.

=== August ===
- 7 August – Mario Tronti, 92, philosopher and politician.
- 10 August
  - Michela Murgia, 51, novelist and playwright.
  - Antonella Lualdi, 92, actress and singer.
  - Cesare Cipollini, 64, Olympic cyclist.
- 14 August – Francesco Alberoni, 93, journalist and sociologist.
- 16 August – Renata Scotto, 89, operatic soprano.
- 19 August – Carlo Mazzone, 86, footballer and manager.
- 22 August – Toto Cutugno, 80, singer-songwriter and musician.

=== September ===
- 6 September – Giuliano Montaldo, 93, film director (Sacco and Vanzetti, Machine Gun McCain, The Reckless).
- 22 September – Giorgio Napolitano, 98, former President of Italy (2006–2015).
- 25 September – Luigi Minchillo, 68, Italian Olympic boxer (1976), heart attack.
- 28 September – Armando Sommajuolo, 70, Italian journalist (TG La7).

=== October ===
- 3 October – Giulio Quercini, 81, Italian journalist (Rinascita) and politician, deputy (1987–1992).

=== November ===
- 10 November – Davide Renne, 46, Italian fashion designer (Moschino), heart attack.
- 17 November – Domenica Ercolani, 113, Italian supercentenarian, old age.

=== December ===
- 3 December – Gaetano Giuliano, 94, Italian politician, old age.
- 6 December – Marisa Pavan, 91, actress (The Rose Tattoo, The Man in the Gray Flannel Suit, Solomon and Sheba).
- 16 December
  - Antonio Negri, 90, political philosopher.
  - Orianna Santunione, 89, operatic soprano.
- 28 December – Alda Grimaldi, 104, director and actress.
