= Benito (name) =

- Pronunciation: Spanish: [beˈnito] Italian: [beˈniːto]
- Gender: Male

Origin
- Meaning: "blessed"

Other names
- Related names: Benedetto, Benedict, Bento, Baruch, Mubarak

Benito is the Spanish form of Benedict and is both a masculine given name and a surname.

== People with the given name "Benito" include ==
=== A ===
- Benito Manuel Agüero (1624–1668), Spanish painter
- Benito Alazraki (1921–2007), Mexican film director
- Benito Andion, Salvadorian diplomat
- Benito Antonio Martínez Ocasio (born 1994), Puerto Rican singer known as "Bad Bunny"
- Benito Archundia (born 1966), Mexican football referee
- Benito Armiñán, Spanish soldier

=== B ===
- Benito Báez (born 1977), Dominican baseball player
- Benito Baranda (born 1959), Chilean psychologist
- Benito Bello de Torices (1660–1714), Spanish composer
- Benito Boldi (1934–2021), Italian footballer
- Benito Bollati (1926–2023), Italian lawyer and politician
- Benito Pérez Brito (1747–1813), Spanish military officer
- Benito Buachidze (1905–1937), Georgian literary critic

=== C ===
- Benito Cabanban (1911–1990), Filipino bishop
- Benito Cabrera (born 1963), Spanish composer
- Benito Calderón (1902–??), Cuban baseball player
- Benito Canónico (1894–1971), Venezuelan composer
- Benito Carbone (born 1971), Italian footballer
- Benito Carvajales (1913–??), Cuban footballer
- Benito Castro (1946–2023), Mexican musician
- Benito Cereno (writer), American comic book writer
- Benito Cocchi (1934–2016), Italian bishop
- Benito Contreras (1905–1972), Mexican footballer
- Benito Corghi (1938–1976), Italian truck driver
- Benito Rebolledo Correa (1880–1964), Chilean painter

=== D ===
- Benito de Jesús (1912–2010), Puerto Rican songwriter
- Benito T. de Leon (born 1960), Filipino military officer
- Benito R. de Monfort (1800–1871), Spanish photographer
- Benito de Rivas (died 1668), Puerto Rican prelate
- Benito de San Juan (1727–1809), Spanish military officer
- Benito Fernández de Santa Ana (1707–1761), Spanish friar
- Benito de Soto (1805–1835), Spanish pirate
- Benito Díaz (1898–1990), Spanish footballer
- Benito di Paula (1941–2026), Brazilian singer-songwriter

=== E ===
- Benito Elizalde (born 1961), Spanish rower
- Benito Espinós (1748–1818), Spanish painter

=== F ===
- Benito Floro (born 1952), Spanish football manager
- Benito Gennaro Franceschetti (1935–2005), Italian archbishop

=== G ===
- Benito Pérez Galdós (1843–1920), Spanish novelist
- Benito Garozzo (born 1927), Italian bridge player
- Benito Caballero Garza (born 1965), Mexican politician
- Benito Guerra Jr. (born 1985), Mexican rally driver
- Benito Gutmacher (born 1950), Argentinian actor

=== H ===
- Benito Huerta (born 1952), American artist

=== J ===
- Benito Jacovitti (1923–1997), Italian comic artist
- Benito Serrano Jiménez (1850–1945), Costa Rican politician
- Benito Joanet (1935–2020), Spanish footballer and manager
- Benito Jones (born 1997), American football player
- Benito Juárez (1806–1872), Mexican politician

=== K ===
- Benito Kemble (born 1968), Dutch footballer

=== L ===
- Benito Legarda (1853–1915), Filipino legislator
- Benito J. Legarda (1926–2020), Filipino historian
- Benito Lertxundi (born 1942), Spanish singer-songwriter
- Benito Lopez (born 1994), American mixed martial artist
- Benito Lopez (politician) (1877–1908), Filipino politician
- Benito Lorenzi (1925–2007), Italian football player
- Benito Lynch (1885–1951), Argentine novelist

=== M ===
- Benito Madueño y Ramos (1654–1739), Spanish prelate
- Benito Quinquela Martín (1890–1977), Argentine painter
- Benito Martinez (disambiguation), multiple people
- Benito Masilevu (born 1989), Fijian rugby union footballer
- Benito Medero (1922–2007), Uruguayan politician
- Benito Messeguer (1930–1982), Spanish-Mexican artist
- Benito Montalvo (born 1985), Argentine football coach
- Benito Arias Montano (1527–1598), Spanish orientalist
- Benito Chávez Montenegro (born 1947), Mexican politician
- Benito Jerónimo Feijoo e Montenegro (1676–1764), Galician monk
- Benito Morales (1803–1889), Nicaraguan politician
- Benito Mussolini (1883–1945), Italian Duce

=== N ===
- Benito Nardone (1906–1964), Uruguayan journalist
- Benito Natividad (1875–1964), Filipino military officer

=== O ===
- Benito Orgiana (1938–2021), Italian politician
- Benito Owusu Bio (born 1968), Ghanaian politician

=== P ===
- Benito Pabón y Suárez de Urbina (1895–1958), Spanish lawyer and trade unionist
- Benito Pastoriza Iyodo (1954–2022), Puerto Rican author
- Benito Pavoni (1936–2023), Italian politician
- Benito Vicetto Pérez (1824–1878), Galician writer
- Benito Perojo (1894–1974), Spanish film director
- Benito Pocino (born 1958), Spanish actor
- Benito Prats (born 1980), Cuban American psychic, realtor, Award winning exotic dancer.

=== R ===
- Benito Raman (born 1994), Belgian footballer
- Benito Ramírez (born 1995), Spanish footballer
- Benito Ramos (fencer) (1913–??), Mexican fencer
- Benito Ramos (born 1978), Bolivian politician
- Benito F. Reyes (1914–1992), Filipino academic administrator
- Benito Rigoni (1936–2021), Italian bobsledder
- Benito Romano (born 1950), Puerto Rican-American politician
- Benito Ros (born 1981), Spanish mountain cyclist
- Benito Rosales, Nicaraguan politician

=== S ===
- Benito Salas (disambiguation), multiple people
- Benito Santiago (born 1965), Puerto Rican baseball player
- Benito Santiago Jr. (born 1989), Puerto Rican basketball player
- Benito Sanz y Forés (1828–1895), Spanish cardinal
- Benito Sarti (1936–2020), Italian footballer
- Benito Skinner (born 1993), American comedian
- Benito Stefanelli (1929–1999), Italian film actor and stuntman
- Benito Sylvain (1868–1915), Haitian journalist

=== T ===
- Benito Tiamzon (1951–2022), Filipino political organizer
- Benito Totti (1914–1940), Italian boxer

=== U ===
- Benito Urteaga (1941–1976), Argentine revolutionary

=== V ===
- Benito Rodríguez Valtodano (died 1629), Nicaraguan bishop
- Benito van de Pas (born 1993), Dutch darts player
- Benito Salas Vargas (1770–1816), Colombian military officer
- Benito Vázquez (1738–1810), Spanish soldier and explorer
- Benito Vergara (1934–2015), Filipino plant scientist
- Benito Villegas (1877–1952), Argentine chess master
- Benito Vines (1837–1893), Cuban cleric

=== Z ===
- Benito Zambrano (born 1965), Spanish screenwriter

== Fictional characters ==
- Benito Alessi, character from the Australian soap opera Neighbours
- Benito, in some Spanish-speaking countries, comical character equivalent to Little Johnny

== People with the surname ==
- Alberto Benito (disambiguation), multiple people
- Álvaro Benito (born 1976), Spanish footballer
- Amado Benito Jr. (born 1992), Filipino fighter
- Asier Benito (born 1995), Spanish footballer
- Azucena Sánchez Benito (born 1978), Spanish cyclist
- Carl Benito (born 1954), Canadian politician
- Cesar Benito, Spanish composer
- Diego Benito (born 1988), Spanish footballer
- Don Benito (pirate), Spanish pirate
- Eduardo Benito (1891–1981), Spanish illustrator and painter
- Elizabeth Odio Benito (born 1939), Costa Rican judge
- Gabriel R. G. Benito (born 1960), Norwegian economist
- Goyo Benito (1946–2020), Spanish footballer
- Iker Benito (born 2002), Spanish footballer
- Jordi Benito (1951–2008), Spanish artist
- Loris Benito (born 1992), Swiss footballer
- Marie Benito (born 1965), Guaman long-distance runner
- Miguel Ángel Benito (born 1993), Spanish cyclist
- Mireia Benito (born 1996), Spanish cyclist
- Pedro Benito (born 2000), Spanish footballer
- Sergio Benito (born 1999), Spanish footballer
- Teófilo Benito (1966–2004), Spanish middle-distance runner
