= Tombesi =

Tombesi is an Italian surname. Notable people with the surname include:

- Alessio Tombesi (born 1982), Italian footballer
- Giorgio Tombesi (1926–2023), Italian politician
- Gurlino Tombesi (fl. c. 1492–1501), Italian condottiero
