= Vitti =

Vitti is a surname. Notable people with the surname include:

- João Vitti (born 1967), Brazilian actor
- Jon Vitti (born 1960), American television writer
- Mario Vitti (1926–2023), Italian-Greek philologist
- Monica Vitti (1931–2022), Italian actress
- Pablo Vitti (born 1985), Argentine footballer
- Praski Vitti (1936–2026), Russian artist, painter and muralist
- Rafael Vitti (born 1995), Brazilian actor, musician, and poet
