= Piot Madonna =

Terracotta relief by Donatello, Louvre

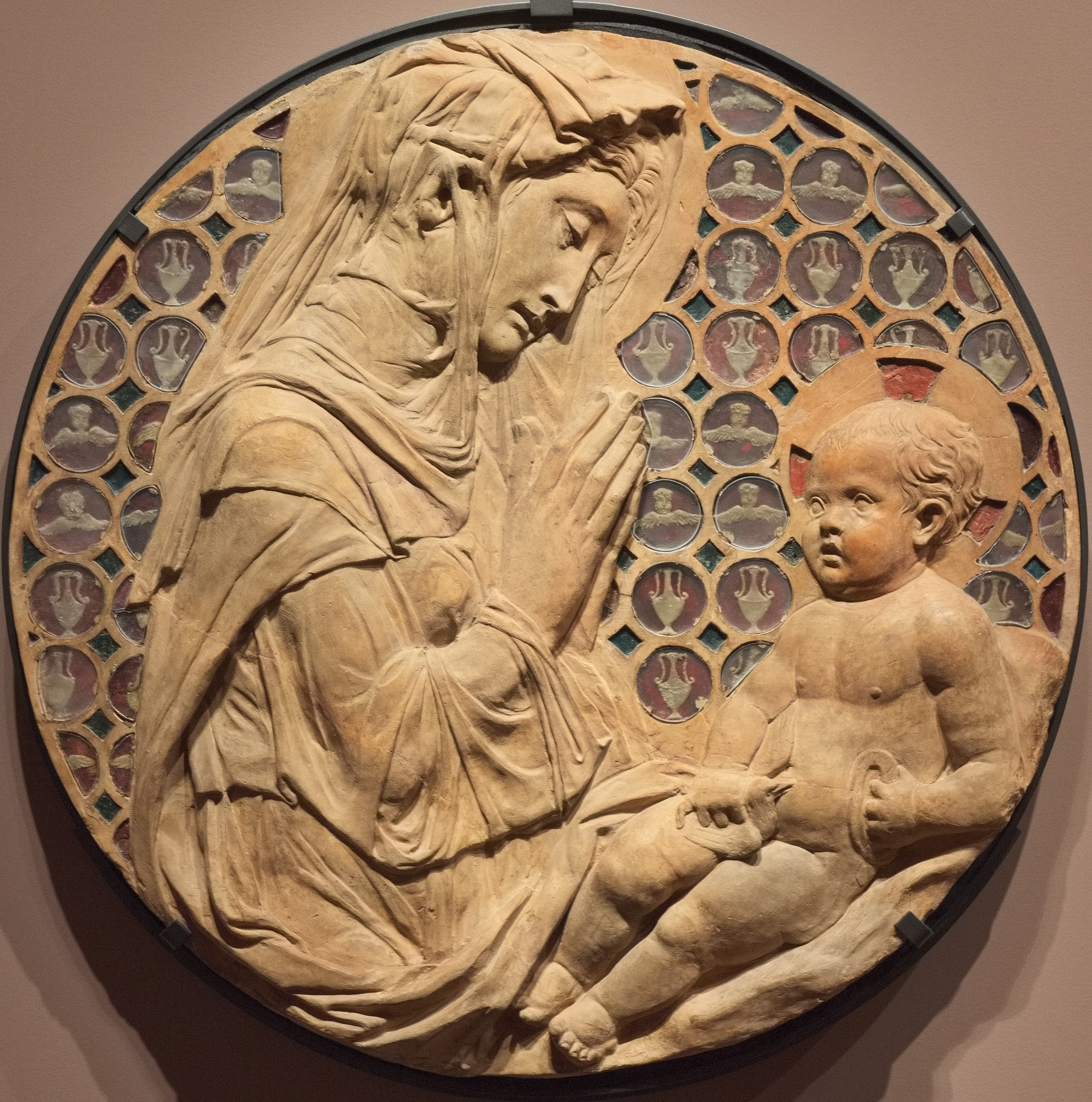

The Piot Madonna is a c.1440 or c.1460 relief sculpture in roundel form by Donatello in the very unusual combination of polychrome terracotta with glass and wax inlays. It is now in the Louvre after being donated to that museum in 1890 by Eugène Piot, after whom it is named.

Prior to 1890 its attribution had alternated between Donatello and his studio and its date had also been hotly debated. Produced for private devotion, its commissioner is unknown.
