= Travedona-Monate =

- Comune
- Comune di Travedona-Monate
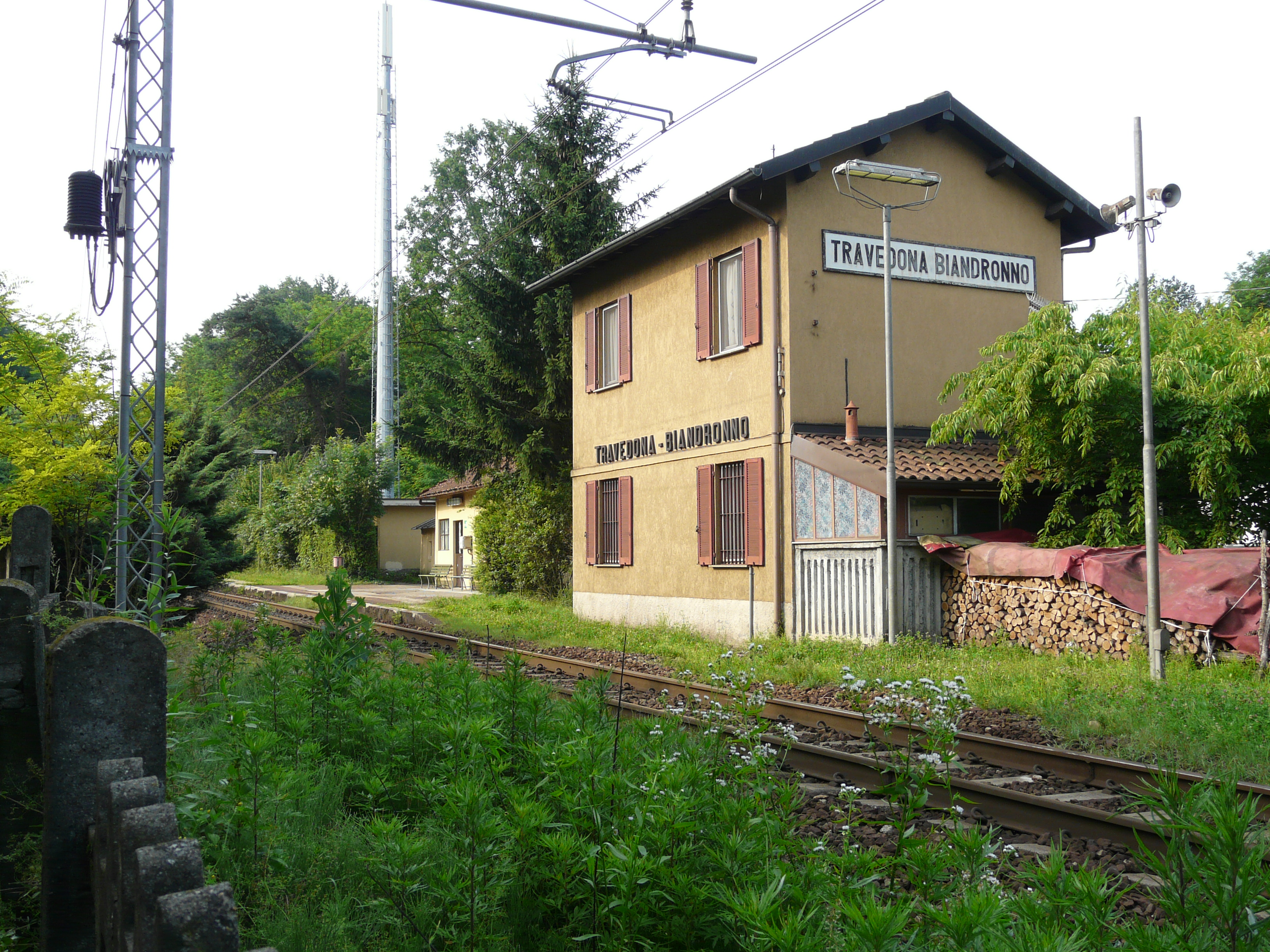

- Location within Italy Location within Lombardy
- Coordinates: 45°48′N 08°40′E
- Country: Italy
- Region: Lombardy
- Province: Varese (VA)

Government
  - Mayor: Laura Bussolotti

Area
  - Total: 9 km^{2} (3.5 sq mi)

Population (2018-01-01)
  - Total: 3,336
  - Density: 370/km^{2} (960/sq mi)
- Time zone: UTC+1 (CET)
  - Summer (DST): UTC+2 (CEST)
- Postal code: 21028
- Dialing code: 0332
- Website: Official website

Travedona-Monate is a comune and small town near the eastern shore of the Lake Maggiore, in the province of Varese, northern Italy. The population is about 3,336 inhabitants. It extends to an area of 9 square kilometres (3.5 mi^{2}), with a density of 371 inhabitants/km^{2}. It shares boundaries with Biandronno, Brebbia, Bregano, Cadrezzate, Comabbio, Ispra, Malgesso, Osmate, Ternate, and the Lago di Monate lake.

== People ==
- Clara (singer) (born 1999), singer-songwriter, actress and model

== See also ==
- Festival del Rock at the Italian language Wikipedia.
