= 2023 Forza Italia leadership election =

Election of Antonio Tajani as leader of Forza Italia

- 15 July 2023

Members of the Forza Italia National Council
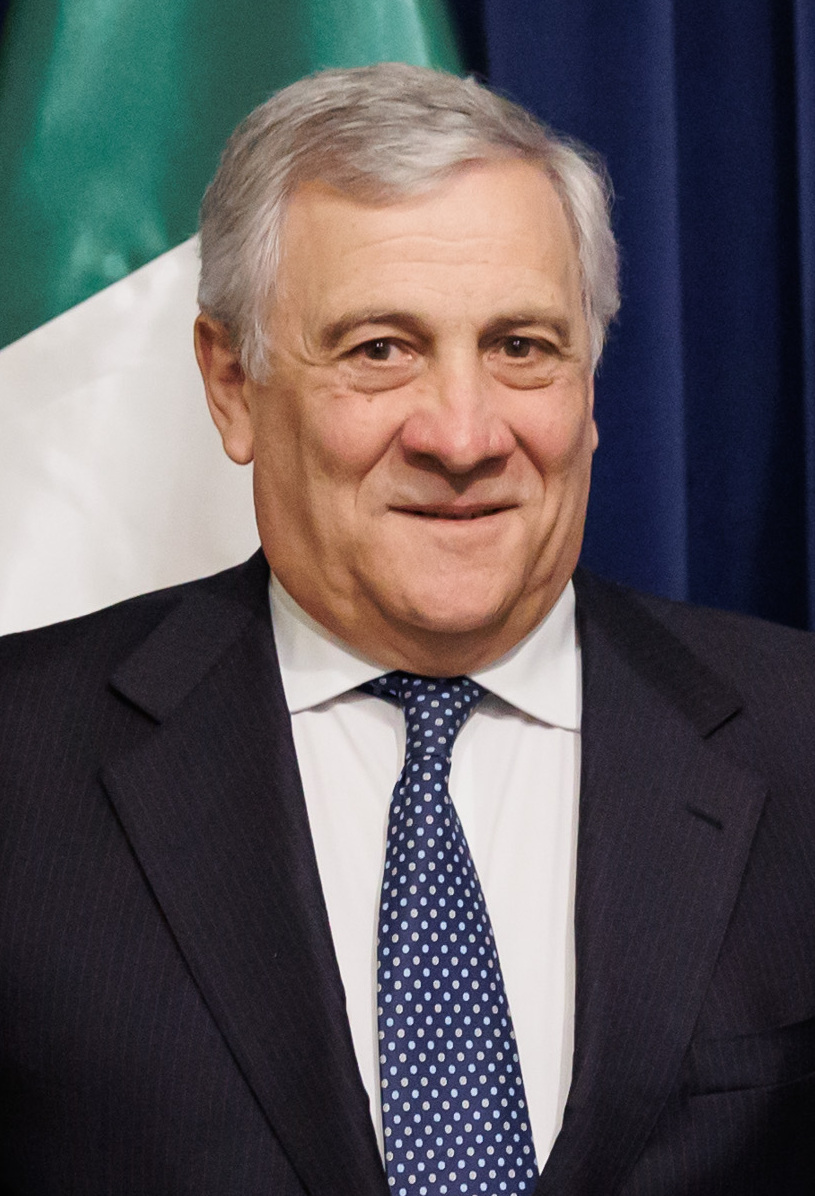
Candidate	Antonio Tajani
National Council vote	Unanimous
Party leader before election
Silvio Berlusconi
Elected Party leader
Antonio Tajani

The 2023 Forza Italia leadership election was held in Rome on 15 July 2023 to choose the leader of Forza Italia following the death of the party's founder and president, Silvio Berlusconi. The party's National Council unanimously elected Antonio Tajani, the sole candidate, as national secretary pro tempore by a show of hands. Tajani was to lead the party until its next national congress.

At the same meeting, the National Council amended the party statute, replacing the office of president with that of national secretary. Berlusconi was retained in the statute as the party's "president and founder".

== Background ==
Berlusconi, who had founded the original Forza Italia in 1994 and led the re-established party from 2013, died on 12 June 2023. His death created uncertainty over the future of a party that had long depended on his personal leadership. At the time, Forza Italia was the smallest of the three principal parties supporting the Meloni government, but its parliamentary representation was important to the governing coalition's majority.

Before the election, Tajani was Forza Italia's national coordinator and vice-president. He was also Italy's deputy prime minister and minister of foreign affairs in the Meloni government, and had previously served as President of the European Parliament. Forza Italia convened its National Council for 15 July to select an interim leader. Tajani was the only candidate and received public support from senior party figures before the meeting.

== Candidates ==
Candidate	Political office	Campaign logo
Antonio Tajani	Deputy Prime Minister (2022–) Minister for Foreign Affairs (2022-) Member of the Chamber of Deputies (2022-) Vice-president of Forza Italia (2018-2023) President of the European Parliament (2017-2019) First Vice-President of the European Parliament (2014-2017) European Commissioner for Industry and Entrepreneurship (2010-2014) European Commissioner for Transport (2008-2010) Member of the European Parliament (2014-2022; 1994-2008)	

== National Council meeting ==
The National Council met at the Hotel Parco dei Principi in Rome. It was the party body's first meeting following Berlusconi's death.

Before the leadership vote, Tajani proposed amending the statute so that the office of party president would be replaced by the office of national secretary, arguing that Berlusconi should remain the party's only president. The National Council approved the amendment unanimously by a show of hands and also formally designated Berlusconi as "president and founder".

Tajani was then elected national secretary pro tempore unanimously by a show of hands. No numerical vote total was announced. In his speech following the vote, Tajani emphasised continuity with Berlusconi's political legacy while describing the task of succeeding him as difficult.

== Result ==
Candidate	National Council vote	Result
Antonio Tajani	Unanimous show of hands	Elected

== Aftermath ==
Tajani initially held the position on a provisional basis pending a national congress. On 24 February 2024, Forza Italia's national congress in Rome unanimously confirmed him as national secretary.

== See also ==
- 2023 in Italy
- List of political parties in Italy
