= Santi Pietro e Paolo, Brebbia =

Church in Lombardy, Italy

Santi Pietro e Paolo
- Chiesa dei Santi Pietro e Paolo
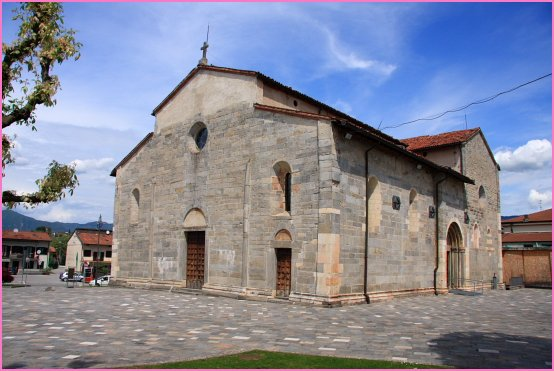
- The forefront of the St. Peter and Paul Church

- The church is located in the Northwest of Lombardy, near the Lake Maggiore. Santi Pietro e Paolo (Italy)
- 45.828380°N 8.650305°E
- Location: Via della Chiesa 8, 21020, Brebbia
- Country: Italy
- Denomination: Catholic Church
- Religious order: Catholic

History
- Former name: Church of Saint Mary
- Dedication: Saint Peter, Saint Paul

Architecture
- Architect: Julius of Novara
- Architectural type: Church
- Style: Romanesque
- Completed: 1100

Specifications
- Length: 27.09 metres (88.9 ft)
- Width: 19.80 metres (65.0 ft)
- Height: 13.89 metres (45.6 ft)
- Materials: Serizzo, Granite, Angera Stone

Administration
- Province: Varese
- Diocese: Archdiocese of Milan
- Deanery: Deanate of Besozzo

Santi Pietro e Paolo ('St. Peter and Paul', Italian: Chiesa dei Santi Pietro e Paolo) is a Catholic church in Brebbia in the province of Varese, Italy. The church was built in 1100 and is a national monument. It is considered one of the best preserved Romanesque buildings in the province.

== Location ==
The St. Peter and Paul Church is situated in the centre of Brebbia, in the region of Lombardy. The town was the seat of a castle of the Milanese Archbishops in the medieval period.

== History ==
The Church of St. Peter and Paul is one of the best preserved churches in Italy. It was built in the 12th century by Julius of Novara, who was allied with the Romanic army. They decided that they wanted to replace an already existing church with a much bigger one on the same location. The St. Peter and St. Paul Church was built under Roman influence and is characterized by a strong Romanesque style. The church features various artworks, including paintings and frescoes dedicated to Queen Mary, St. Peter and St. Paul, the patrons of the town.

St. Paul and Peter Church is associated with the myth of St. Julius, the founder of the church. The myth tells that Julius came with his brother from Greece to evangelize the area close to Orta Lake, and decided to destroy the temple of Minerva and build the Brebbia Church. The church has undergone various renovations, including the change of the central nave in the 17th century, which now includes more complex trusses, and restyling of the artwork.

=== Origins ===
The church is located on or near the site of an earlier Roman temple dedicated to Minerva, built to celebrate a victory against the Celts, who occupied the cities of Milan and Como.

Following Theodosius I's decision to adopt the Catholic religion, the Romans replaced Minerva's temple with a Christian church. This original church was subsequently replaced with the current church of St. Peter and Paul. The construction of the new Church was due partially to increasing population in the region.

=== The title of pieve ===
During the 5th century, after several barbaric invasions against the town of Brebbia, the church gained importance and was granted the title of pieve, becoming the centre of the archbishops of Insubria. The church lost the title of pieve in 1567, when it was passed to the city of Milan.

=== Similarities with regional church architecture ===
The church evinces architectural analogies with other churches of the area. These churches were also built around the 12th century and include Church of S. Maria del Tiglio; Church of S. Antonio of San Fedele Intelvi; Church of S. Vittore di Bedero; and S. Pietro di Gallarate. These churches are characterized by a Romanesque architecture and were based on three naves and one apse. The apse are all located at the end of the main nave.

Art critics have advanced the hypothesis that all of these were built under the main guidance of Julius of Novara, due to the similarity in style.

=== Besozzi family ===
The Church of St Peter and Paul contains several references to the Besozzi family. This family gained power in the 12th century and financed the construction of various churches and monuments, including the Church of St. Peter and Paul in Brebbia. This funding allowed the family to gain power in the area and to obtain favourable treatment in the affairs of the Catholic Church. The family had a coat of arms characterized by a golden flying eagle, which features in the church's fresco of the crucifixion.

== Architecture ==
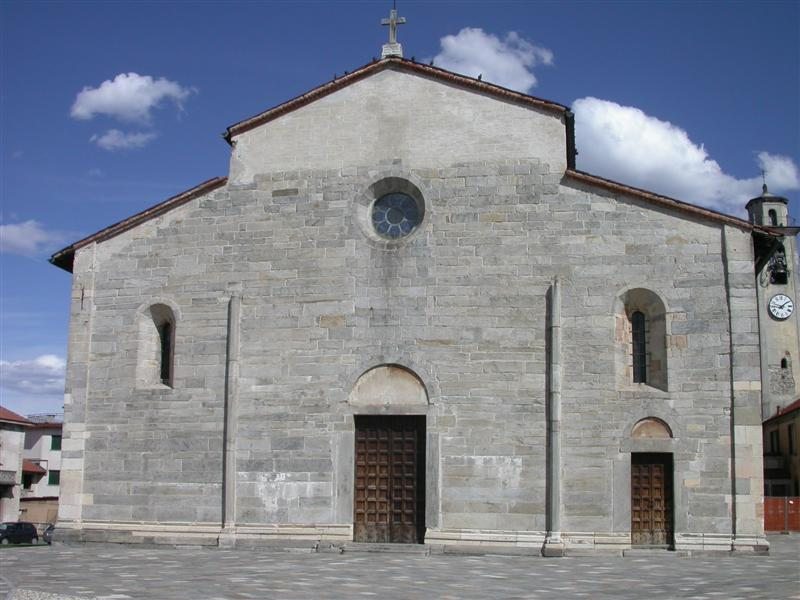
Main entrance of the church

St. Peter and Paul Church has a typical Romanesque architecture: it is elementary and characterized by three naves and one apse, located at the end of the main nave and orientated to the east. There is a transept that comes out from the secondary naves.

The main nave was originally characterized by a truss, substituted in the 17th century by a vault. This renovation work destabilized the building and because of that it required further structural modifications, which include the addition of tie-rods and metal slabs. These additions still remain visible on the church exterior.

=== Exterior ===
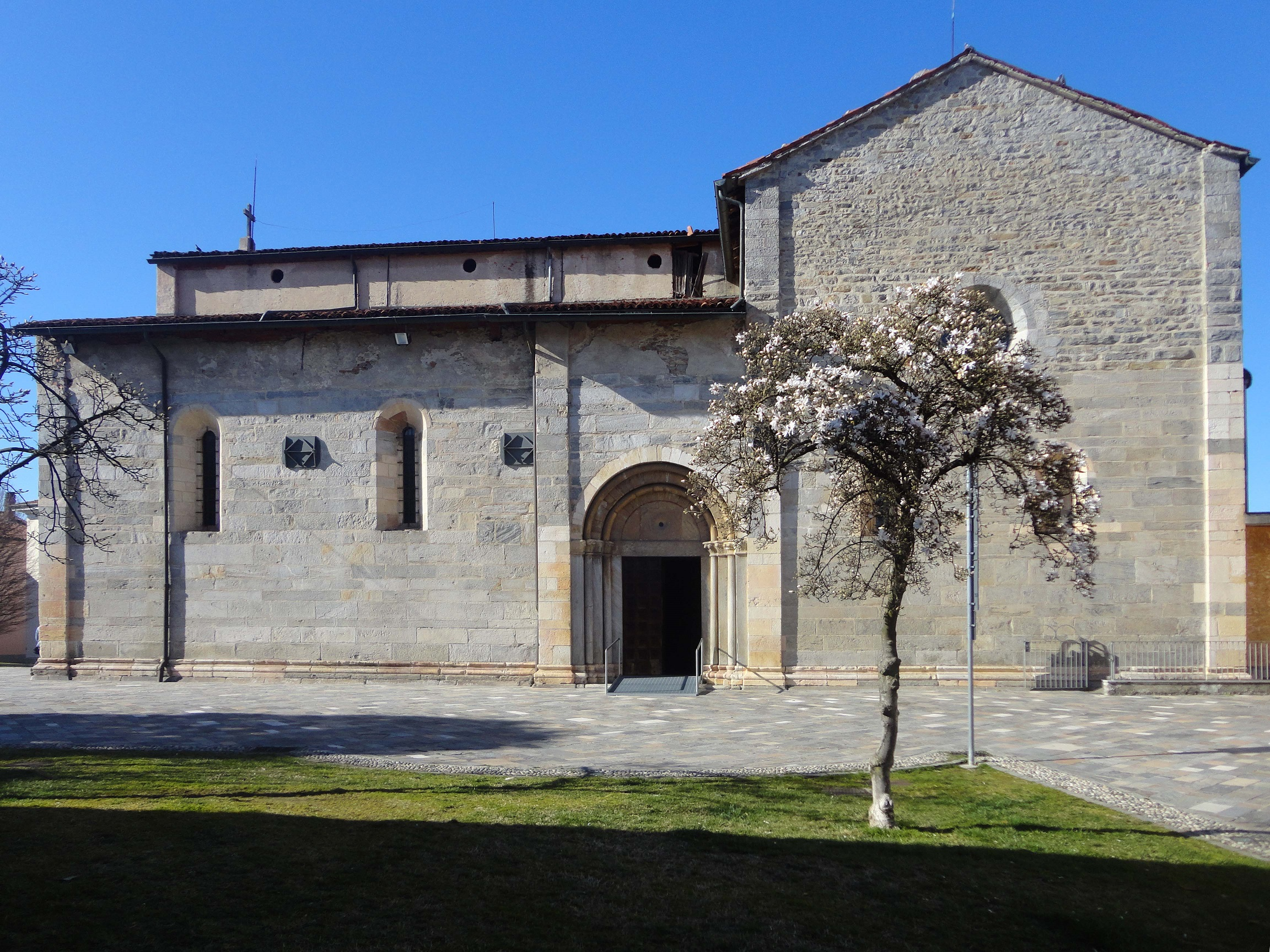
The door on the southern side of the church

The wall of the church is made of great blocks of serizzo, granite and stone from Angera; they are positioned in a linear horizontal order.

The front of the church shows the sloping roofs that come from the elevation of the main nave of 1600. The original structure of the church was made in a hut shape. The elevation of the nave is hidden by the plastering. The front of the church is divided into three parts as it is inside. On the high side of the front is an oculus, located in the middle, and two single-lancet windows in the secondary naves. The architects decided to complete the front with two doors: the main door is located in the centre, and it has a secondary door beside, which is smaller.

On the south side of the building, there is a door in the middle of two single-lancet windows, similar to the ones in the front. The door is particularly decorated and is used as the main entrance of the church.

The transept is opened by two single-lancet windows located in a low level, and an oculus in the middle.

The apse is closed by the transept, and it is divided into three parts by two half pedestals. Each part is defined by a single-lancet splayed window with an arch and solid Angera stones. The single-lancet window of the central part is bigger than the others and more elegant. It is similar to the door on the south side of the building. The north side of the building is plain with no windows.

=== Interior ===
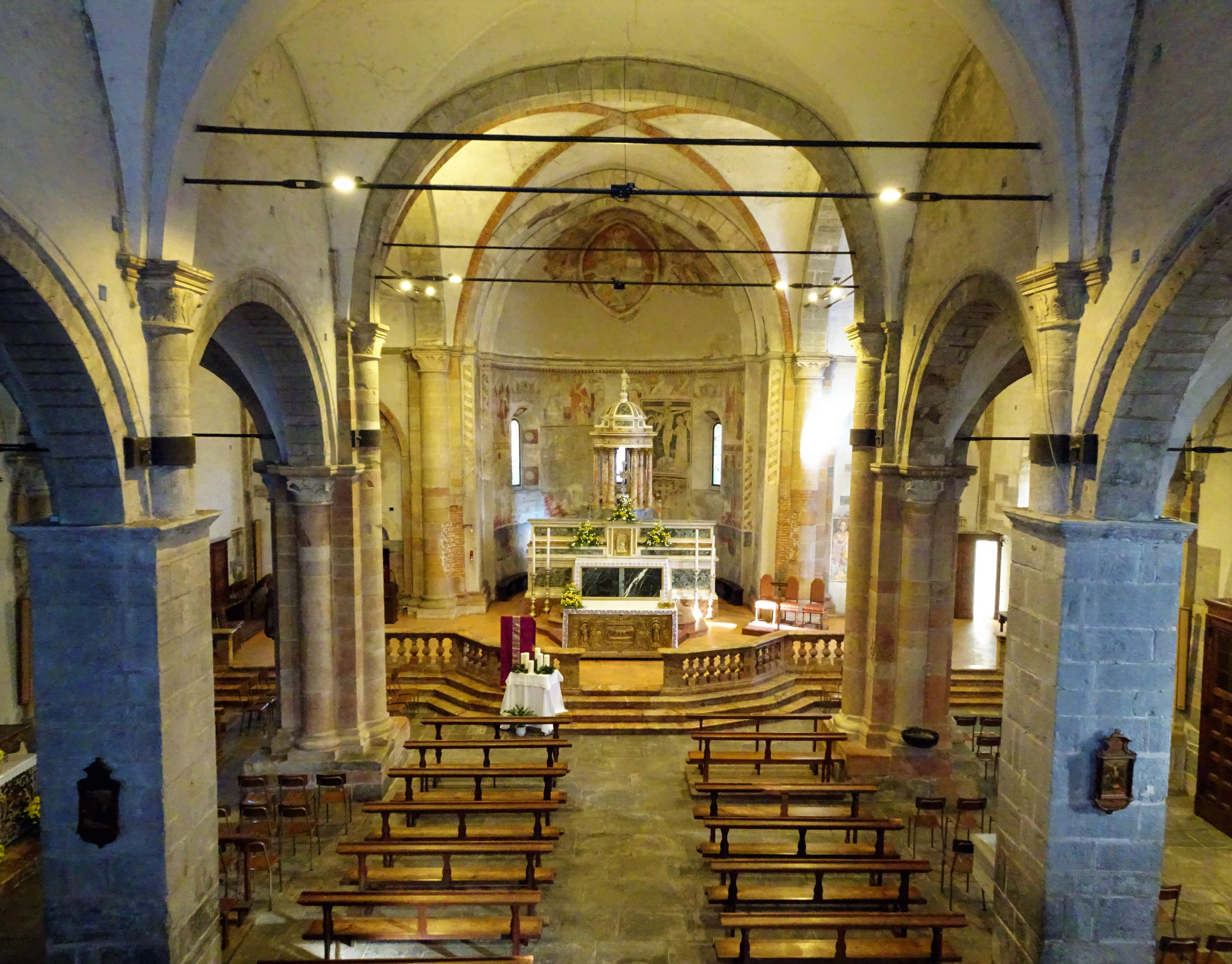
Interior of the church

The interior has three naves on square pillars. Originally it had a trussed roof on the central nave. The semi-columns that start from the level of the capitals have been used to support the fall of the seventeenth-century vaults. The wide eastern apse has an ogival-shaped basin that still has 15th-century frescoes.

From the inside of the church, the problems related to the restructuring of the church are evident. The naves are characterized by three spans, and the main nave is twice the size of the secondary naves. The pillars of the church are characterized by having different shapes. They bear a wide cross vault, located in the centre of the transept. This area is the only one that was originally covered by the vault, to emphasize the holy part of the church.

== Artwork ==
=== The apse ===
The frescoes can be found in the apse and in the southern nave of the church. The apse is dominated by a basin, which is the most important feature of the complex as it highlights the altar and catches the eye of the visitors who enter the church. The frescoes have been subject to several changes and were replaced by new frescoes with more modern features. This coverage can be seen by the different thicknesses on the wall. Understanding the original frescoes is difficult because documentation is scarce and most of them date back to the early 15th century.

The pastoral visit in 1569 was led by Leonetto Chiavone. It resulted in a statement saying that the altar was placed under a painted and ornamented vault. In the pastoral visit of 1581, the apse is described as full of frescoes, but with corroded images due to the antiquity. Descriptions of these frescoes are missing and it is impossible to define which of the visible frescoes are original ones. During post-1939 restorations, some antique frescoes were uncovered that were obscured during restoration work in the 16th century.

The only dateable fresco is of the Crucifixion, located at the top right of the central window. The sides of the cross are faded but remain to show the date in Roman numerals. The coat of arms of the Besozzi family is still visible. The work is very simplified due to the characters covering all available places with a clean and dark outline. There are also decorations visible in the ornaments on the vestments and in the rays above the aureole of the angels and saints. Above the arch which introduces the presbytery, the Master of the Fissiraga Tomb has painted an intense Gothic-style Crucifixion. Its dramatic look is contained in the gestures of Mary and John, in the gestures of the angels that gather the Blood of Christ from the chalice, and with the solemnity that contrasts with the desperate flights of their respective Varesini around the cross.

The fresco that is placed on the left side of the central window represents the Madonna Enthroned with the Child and Saint Peter. The throne of the Virgin Mary has Gothic elements, such as turrets and pinnacles, making it look like a sacred edifice. The theme of Virgin Mary as mother is the image of the Church that is usually suggested, but Saint Peter acquires a particular importance in this fresco. The state of conservation of the artwork is precarious due to the disappearance of many graphic details. These were originally described as numerous, but currently only remain in the vestment of the Child and in its borders.

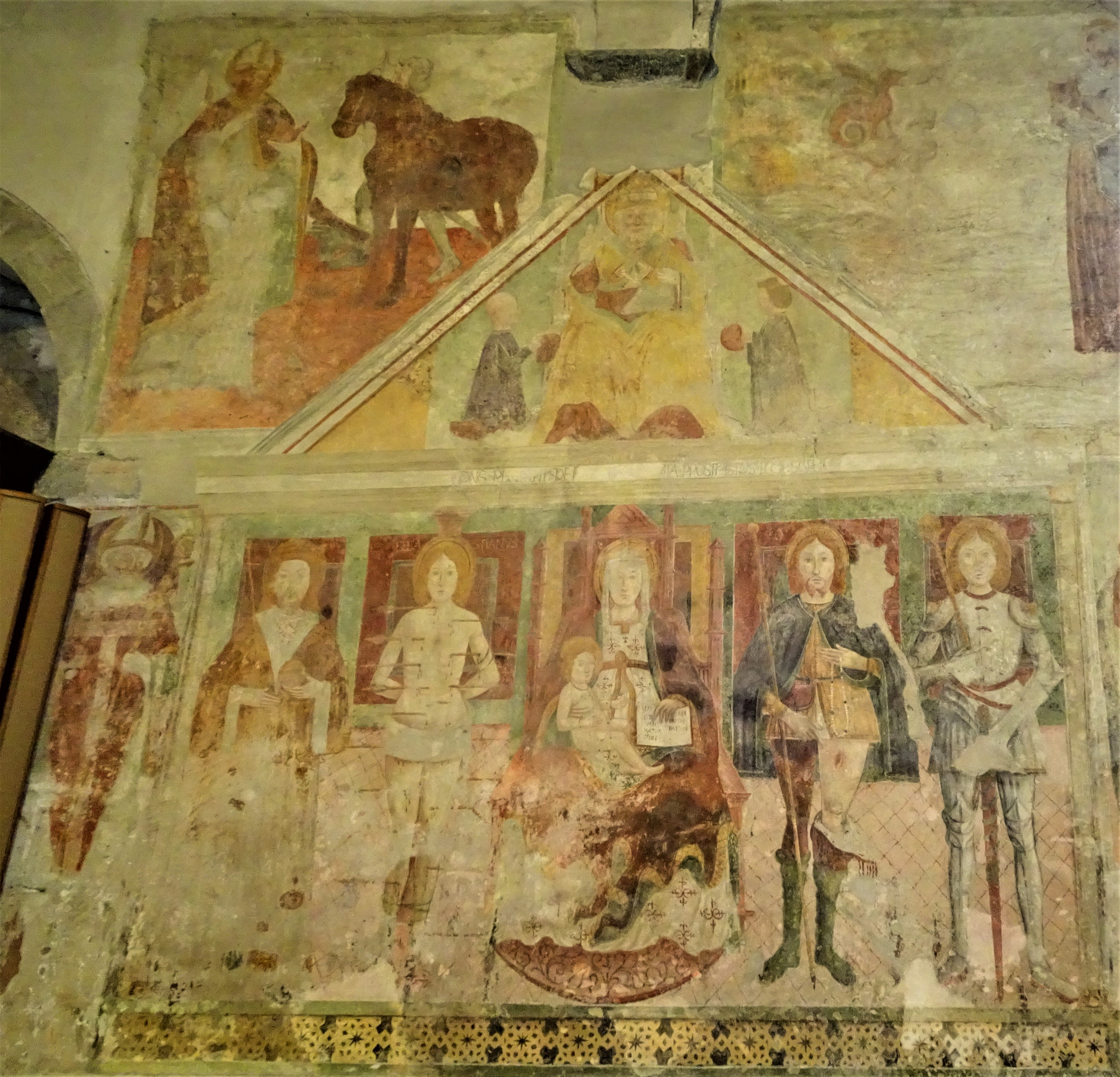
Madonna Enthroned with the Christ child and Saint Peter

Under the Crucifixion fresco is a fragmented fresco with different stylistic characteristics. The plaster on which the fresco is painted has a lower thickness, showing that the artwork is older. It is estimated to date between the end of the 13th century and the start of the 14th century. The visible part represents figures of saints, of whom on the right is Saint Peter with the keys and the book, and John the Baptist dressed in skins and a symbol of the Angel of God in his hand. The usage of the lines is nearly obsessive: the beards, hair, alignment of the face, margins of the clothes and the aureoles. The veins of the wood of the cross are underlined by dark lines and the artist ornamented the superior border with flowers.

Similar characteristics can be found in a fragment of Ambrose, highlighted under two saints from 1400 in the lower band of the left arch. Part of the face, the aureole and the three scourges are visible. Around the figure there is a partially conserved frame similar to the Crucifixion.

A group of figures of saints was found in the southern nave during the restorations in 1963–1964. The altar of Saint Stephen should have been situated here, numerous times named in the pastoral visits in the end of 1500. When in 1716 the current altar of the Immaculate Conception was erected, these frescoes were partially destroyed and hidden behind a wall of bricks. It is possible to distinguish the central part of a figure wearing a dalmatic, an attribute of Saint Stephen. A nearly complete figure exists to the left of the altar. This saint, maybe Paul, has the same frontal presentation of Ambrose, the same design in hair and vestments, and the same design in the aureole.

==== The apsidal basin ====
This part of the basin is very damaged. The whole inferior zone is crossed by a large fracture and few traces of colour appear. The visible figures are ruined in several places, and the decorative borders appear to be reworked.

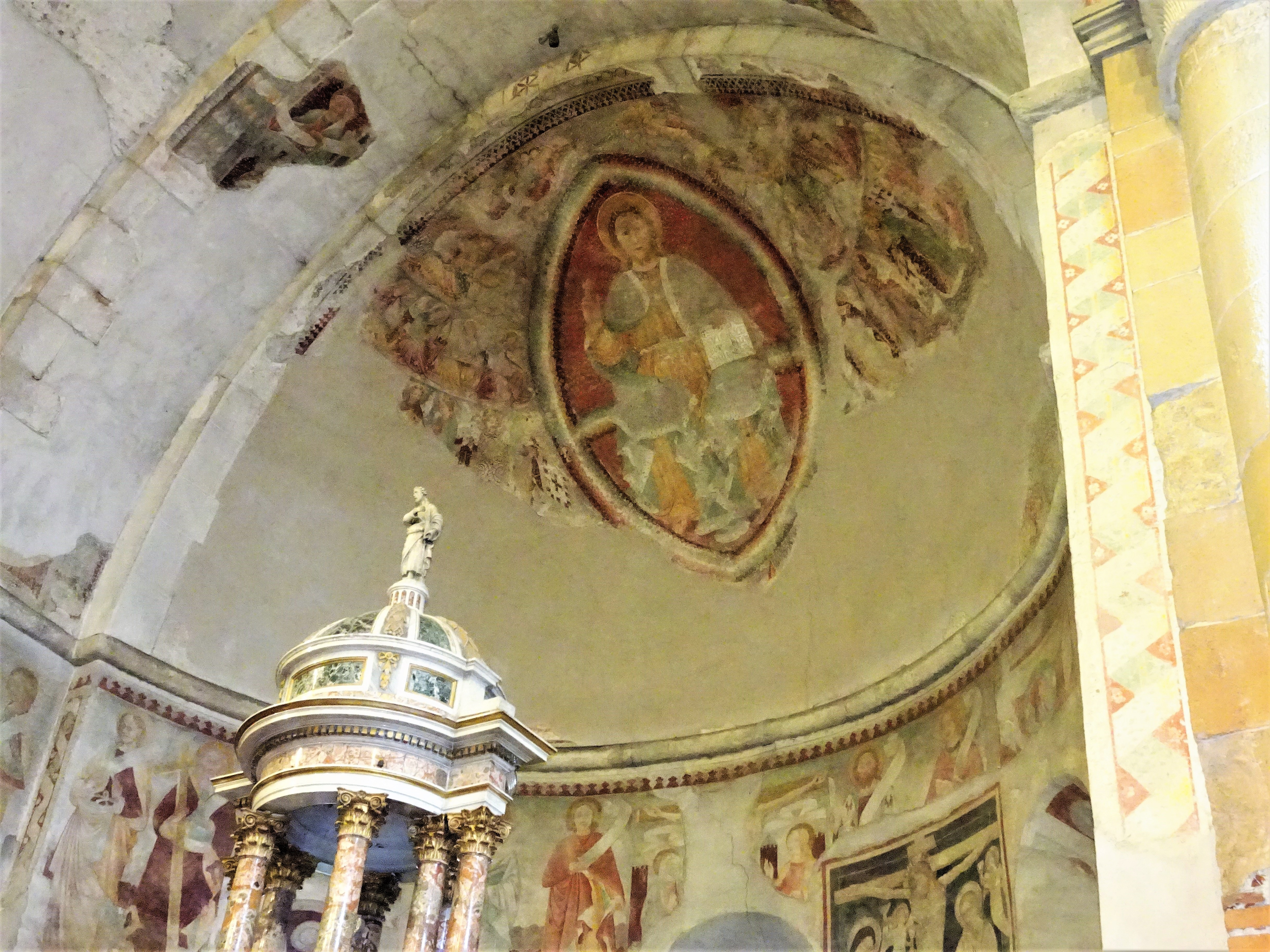
The apsidal basin of St. Peter and Paul, Brebbia

The big central figure of Christ dominates the whole church, and it is the most important point doctrinally. Its right hand is elevated in the gesture of benediction, while the left holds the book with the script: EGO SUM LUX MUNDI VIA VERITAS ET VITA ('I am the light of the world, the street, the truth, and the life'). It is the Christ in Majesty, represented by a typically Medieval iconography, that in the Varesotto and in other areas of Lombardy continued to be used until the end of 1400. In the church is a true angelic concert, structured in overlapping rows, making it look like a process of successive works. In the space between the basin and the upper part of the mandorla, the first group of standing angels can be found that hold thuribles. On those to the left it is still possible to read the beginning of the announcement to the pastors: GLORIA IN ECCELSIS DEO ET IN TERRA PAX ('Glory to God in the heavens and peace on earth'). The bodies of these angels are elongated and folded in order to fit the form of the architecture. Very different are the musician angels which are seated directly below. Some of their instruments are recognizable: two small organs, a tambourine, a large flute, different harps of various shapes and other stringed instruments like the rebec, lute and psaltery. These are instruments used to compose an orchestra with a delicate sound. The last visible order is formed again of standing angels. Some play instruments, but most look in the direction of Christ, holding the banners of the Resurrection, with the crosses and borders decorated. The loss of the lower order makes it difficult to evaluate the complex significance of the frescoes of the basin.

=== The Apostles and Crucifixion ===
Directly under the basin is a series of Apostles, arranged in pairs at the side of the Crucifixion. The lower section of the last one was removed during renovations to the central window. The lateral windows must already have been present when it was painted as the arrangement of the figures takes their existence into consideration. The paintings of Apostles beside the Crucifixion were partially damaged during the course of restoration in order to highlight the two oldest frescoes, which are the Madonna Enthroned with St. Peter and the Crucifixion from 1368.

The presence of the Apostles in this zone of the apse recalls the decoration of numerous other churches of the Varesotto. The painter set the Apostles in a landscape background, and a few wave-like symbols may evince the reflections of water on a lake. The clothes have decorations that do not take into account the arrangement in fold of the fabric. Some of the faces have a frontal presentation, while others still have the typologies of the basin. This is the case of Matthew the Apostle, directly to the right of the Crucifixion, whose face has the same marked contours and the same curved lines in the drawing of the eyes and the hair that distinguish most of the angels. The painting is likely from 1500, due to the substitution of the tile background for the landscape background.

Above the lateral windows that interrupt the series of Apostles are located two half-length portraits, one female and one male, characterized by headgear in common use during the 15th century. The two figures are presented in profile, framed by a white suspended drape decorated with a motif of dark vertical and horizontal lines. Under the windows are faint outlines of additional paintings, although the colour has completely vanished.

The frescoes of the lower part of the apse are the most illegible due to the fading of colour and the overlap of different layers of plaster. These images, dating from the late 15th or early 16th century, may have represented a group of saints arranged in pairs like the Apostles. The represented saints are those who are most loyal and dear, like Saint Stephen, protector against the plague, together with Saint Victor. The clothing and the pose revoke late-Gothic elegance, even though the floor is suggestive of the last quarter of the 15th century. Saint Sebastian is not pierced by arrows, but he is limited to holding two darts in his hand, as a sign of identification.

Different are Saint Anthony and Saint Bishop. Frontally disposed, nearly twins in the traits of the face, they are painted in the usual chromatic range of ochre, of brick and dark green. These same colours are also found in the floor tiles.

=== History of the Passion of Christ ===
On the southern wall next to the Saint Sebastian altar, there are a series of paintings depicting the history of the Passion. The conservation status of these frescoes is precarious, due to the conditions of the masonry and the minimum thickness of the plaster. The six upper paintings were torn in 1963 due to moisture damage. Five of the paintings were restored and reallocated to their original positions. The sixth one is not longer visible. The lower septa paintings are less spotty than the upper ones but have colour drops, damp patch and traces of retouching.

The thirteen paintings tell in images the events that the liturgy celebrates during Holy Week. This starts with the Triumphal entry into Jerusalem and continues to the Harrowing of Hell.

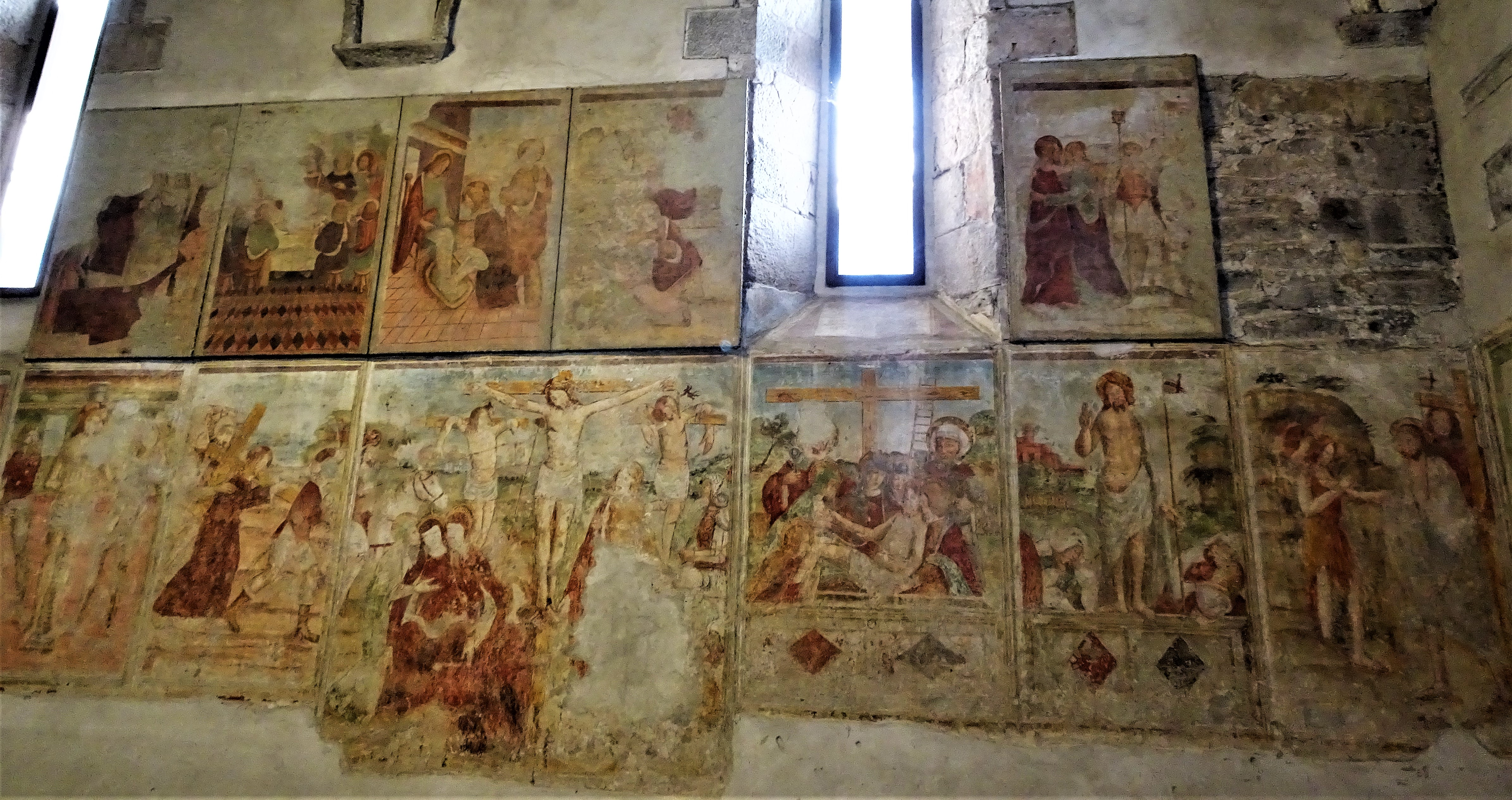
The artwork "History of Passion" in St. Peter and Paul Church, Brebbia

1. Triumphal entry into Jerusalem: The painting is damaged at the top. The lower part of the donkey and of the figure of Christ are still recognizable.
1. Last Supper: The lack of colours does not make it clear that John lays his head on the breast of Jesus. The painter has placed his characters all around the table, adopting a widespread pattern in Lombardy. The diamond floor in the foreground is depicted in tones of ochre and green to give an idea of perspective.
1. Foot washing: It is the best preserved painting of the upper order and introduces some changes compared to most of the current iconography. The apostle kneeling before Christ is not Peter but John. The physiognomy of Peter and his gesture of surprise with his hands raised is attributed to the character on the right side.
2. Agony in the Garden: The scene is damaged and the characters are barely visible. The characters below are the three sleeping apostles and in the top is Christ with the cruciform halo.
3. Taking of Christ: A large damp patch on the right side does not prevent the painting from being read. The painting depicts a soldier holding a torch and Judas kissing Jesus.
4. Sanhedrin trial of Jesus: The sixth painting is no longer visible today, and the interpretation is based on following the chronological order of the liturgy.
5. Christ in front of Pilate: The painting is almost illegible. Christ is at the centre with his hands tied, and is led by Pilate, who is seated under a canopy.
6. Flagellation of Christ: A large part of this painting has a lack of color. Christ is tied to a column and sided by two torturers, who are dressed in fifteenth-century costumes.
7. Christ Going to Calvary: This painting is still very bright. Behind Christ is a group of armed men carrying the cross.
8. Crucifixion of Jesus: This painting has faded significantly. There is a lack of color on the surface and a gap on the right side of the painting. It is the most important scene of the cycle and occupies the central position of the lower paintings. It covers more than twice the space in comparison to the other paintings. The iconography has typical elements from the Lombardian tradition, like the angel and the demon taking the robbers' souls.
9. Lamentation of Christ: This painting has corrosion across the entire surface and especially the bottom. The Grievers are arranged as in a bas-relief and are crushed between the mass of the sepulchre and the cross.
10. Resurrection of Jesus: The frame is the same as that of the previous one, but the composition obtains a vertical lush from the figure of Christ.
11. Harrowing of Hell: This scene is generally found in the most complete cycles of the passion of Jesus. On the upper margin of the thirteenth painting there is an inscription, which is unreadable in some parts: HOC OPUS FECIT FIERI... DE BEXUTIO CANONIC // RESIDENS ISTIUS ... CL ... ABD DE MLO PINXIT ('This work was made by... of Besozzo, canon // resident of this (church) ... and painted by Abbondio of Milan').

== Mythology ==
According to tradition, the first church in Brebbia, with the name of Santa Maria, was founded around the 5th century by Saint Julius of Novara and his brother Giuliano. They grew up in the region of Lake Maggiore and Lake Orta, where there is an island is named after Julius. A legend tells that during the construction of the church, a carpenter accidentally cut off his thumb with an axe and Saint Julius appeared and re-attached the thumb.

It is also known that Saint Julius and his brother travelled in the 4th century from the Greek island Aegina to evangelize the area around the Lake Orta and to build the first Christian church, the Basilica of St. Julius, built on St. Julius Island in Lake Orta.

=== Minerva's temple ===
The church was built on an ancient temple dedicated to the Roman goddess of wisdom and strategic warfare, Minerva, also known as Athena by the Greeks. The legend says that it was St. Julius himself who destroyed the previous existing temple, to establish the dominance of the Christian religion by building a Christian church on the same territory. On the northern side of the church there is a stone with a Roman engraving on it that confirms the past existence of the temple of Minerva. The stone has become quite ruined by time, but the following sentence in Latin is still clear to read:

MINERV (a)

E. C. ALB (in)

VS. CAS (si)

ANUS

V S L M

This is an example of a Christian church built on top of an ancient Pagan temple. The peculiarity lies in the fact that the substitution of the place, from Pagan to Christian, was highlighted by this epigraph.

== See also ==
- Julius of Novara
- Brebbia
- Saint Peter
- Saint Paul
- Passion of Jesus
- Besozzi
- Romanesque architecture
- Christian church
