= Eugène Piot =

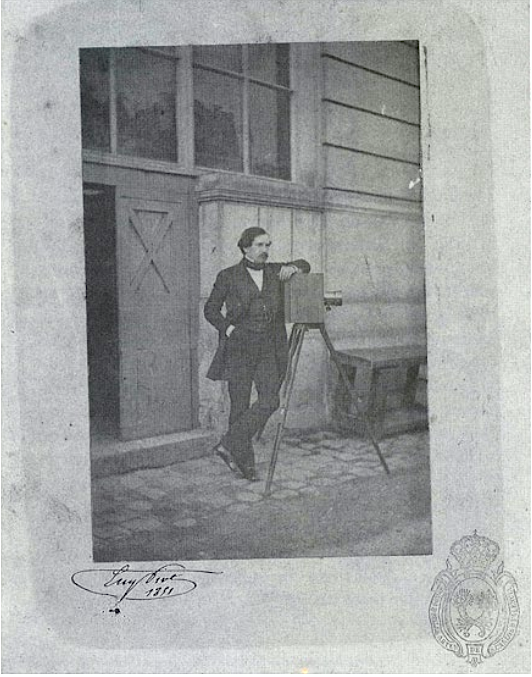
Piot by Benito R. de Monfort (1851).

Eugène Piot (11 November 1812 - 17 January 1890) was a French journalist, art critic, art collector and photographer. His pen name was Nemo.

Piot was born in Paris.
