= Gurlino Tombesi =

Italian condottiero

Gurlino Tombesi or Gorlino of Ravenna (died 25 April 1501, in Ravenna) was an Italian condottiero who fought for Ravenna and the Venetian Republic.

== Family ==
His father Giacomo Tombesi dall'Ova was a nobleman and one of the four senators of Ravenna in the first half of the 15th century, whilst it was under the control of the da Polenta family. He, Matteo Balbo and Obizio Monaldini were beheaded in 1440 on the orders of Ostasio III da Polenta for plotting in favour of a Venetian takeover. Gurlino's great-grandfather Jacobus Tombesiis ab Ovis, son of Johannis de Ferraria, had bought a house in Ravenna in 1352.

A confirmed Ghibelline, Gurlino had a son called Gurlotto who was a Guelph and who was killed in the Camera dei Savi massacre in Ravenna on 4 July 1522. He also had a daughter called Lieta who married Giuliano Rasponi (a Ravennese patrician) and another whose name is unknown who married Paolo Aldobrandini (or Aldovrandini), a captain. Gurlino's brother Bartolomeo, founder of the Tombesi branch, moved to the Marche.

== Life ==
Gurlino became a soldier in his youth, initially under Francesco Gonzaga then in the service of the Venetian Republic, which had expelled the Da Polenta family from Ravenna, exiled them to Candia and gained control over Ravenna. In 1492 he was constable (i.e. a cavalry commander) at Rovereto, whose fortress was housing the Venetian ambassadors Giorgio Contarini and Paolo Pisani, who were awaiting Sigismund, Holy Roman Emperor to try to find a diplomatic solution to the conflict between Venice and Tyrol after Venice's defeat in 1487, in which the same fortress had fallen into Sigismund's hands after a 49-day siege by general Gaudenzio Matsch.

In July 1495 Gurlino took part in the battle of Fornovo between Charles VIII of France and Venice, commanding a column of around a thousand infantry and then (with Giovanni del Matto) the third Venetian line, consisting of around 3,000 men. After Novara was captured, he fought and beat the Duke of Orleans. In 1497 he fought the French to capture Genoa before leaving Alessandria to settle in Felizzano without the consent of Andrea Zancano and Niccolò Foscarini, commanders of the Venetian army.

== Bibliography ==
- Girolamo Rossi, Historie di Ravenna, book VIII
- Filippo Mordani, Vite di ravegnani illustri, Le Monnier Firenze 1854.
