= Brebbia =

- Comune
- Comune di Brebbia
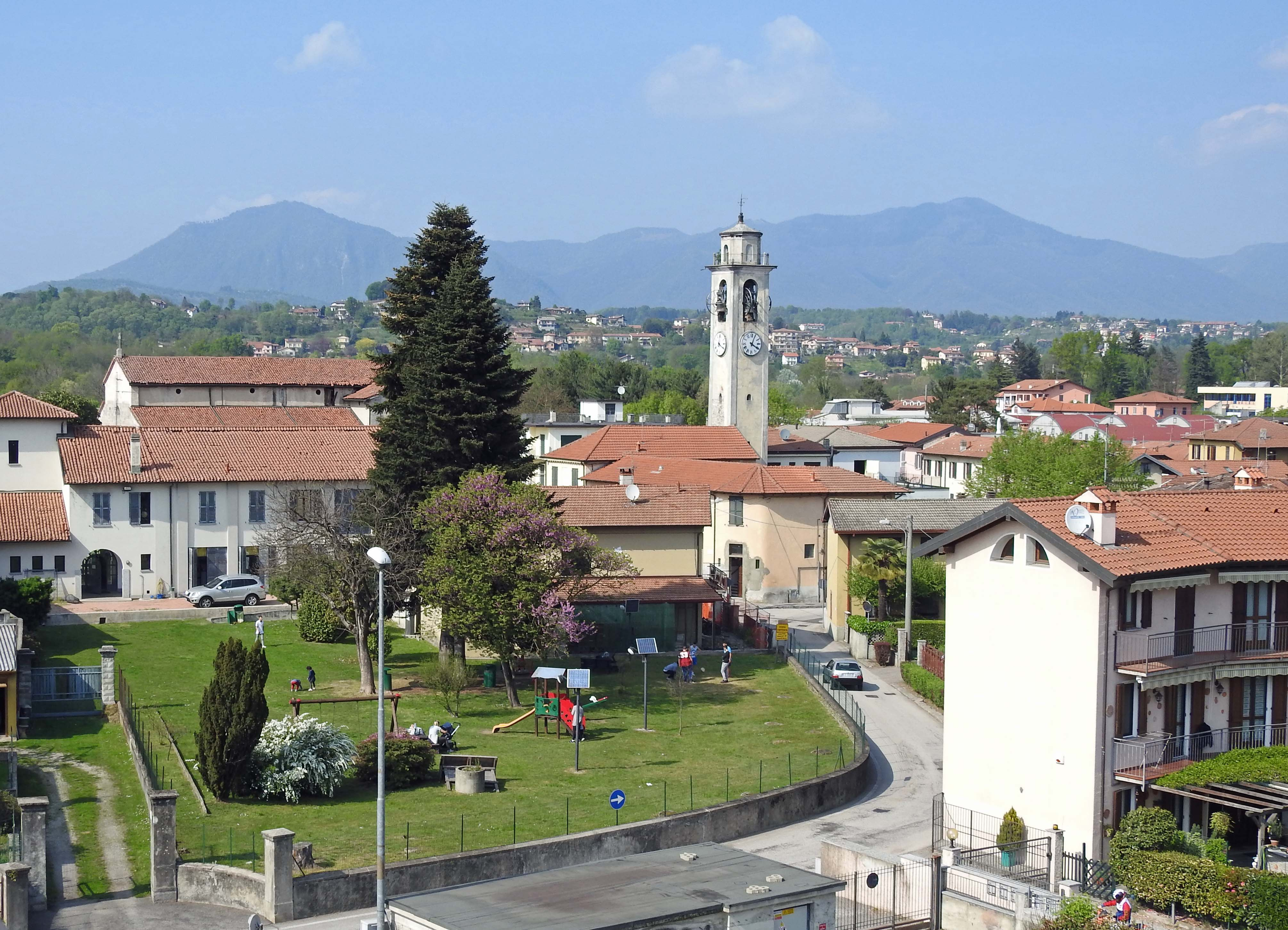
- View of Brebbia

- Coat of arms

- Location within Italy Location within Lombardy
- Coordinates: 45°50′N 8°39′E
- Country: Italy
- Region: Lombardy
- Province: Varese (VA)
- Frazioni: Bozza di Lago, Brebbia Superiore, C.na Cucù, Case Piano, Ghiggerima, Giardinetto, La Chiesuola, Ronchèe, Ronco, Uccelliera, Villaggio Europa

Government
  - Mayor: Alessandro Magni

Area
  - Total: 6.3 km^{2} (2.4 sq mi)
- Elevation: 235 m (771 ft)

Population (31 January 2017)
  - Total: 3,239
  - Density: 510/km^{2} (1,300/sq mi)
- Demonym: Brebbiesi
- Time zone: UTC+1 (CET)
  - Summer (DST): UTC+2 (CEST)
- Postal code: 21020
- Dialing code: 0332
- Patron saint: Saint Peter and Saint Paul
- Saint day: 29 June
- Website: Official website

Brebbia is a comune (municipality) in the Province of Varese in the Italian region Lombardy, located about 60 kilometres (37 mi) northwest of Milan and about 14 kilometres (9 mi) west of Varese.

Brebbia borders the following municipalities: Besozzo, Ispra, Malgesso, Travedona-Monate and Cadrezzate.

The main church is St. Peter and Paul Church, Brebbia. It is located in the centre of the town.
