= Leone Manti =

Italian politician (1944–2023)

Member of the Chamber of Deputies of Italy
- In office 14 April 1992 – 14 April 1994
- Constituency: Calabria

Personal details
- Born: 13 February 1944 Bova, Italy
- Died: 15 February 2023 (aged 79)
- Party: DC

Leone Manti (13 February 1944 – 15 February 2023) was an Italian politician. A member of the Christian Democracy party, he served in the Chamber of Deputies from 1992 to 1994.

Manti died on 15 February 2023, at the age of 79.
