= Benito Calderón =

Cuban baseball player (born 1902)

- Catcher / Third baseman / Left fielder
- Born: 1902; Cienfuegos, Cuba
- Batted: Right Threw: Right

Negro league baseball debut
- 1926, for the Cuban Stars (West)

Last appearance
- 1928, for the Homestead Grays
- Stats at Baseball Reference

Teams
- Cuban Stars (West) (1926–1927); Homestead Grays (1928)

Benito Calderón (1902 – death unknown) was a Cuban professional baseball catcher, third baseman and left fielder in the Negro leagues in the 1920s.

A native of Cienfuegos, Cuba, Calderón made his Negro leagues debut in 1926 with the Cuban Stars (West). He played for the Stars again the following season, then finished his career in 1928 with the Homestead Grays.
