= Benito Vicetto Pérez =

Spanish historian (1824–1878)

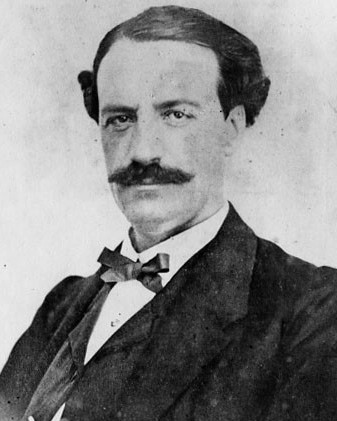
Benito Vicetto Pérez.

Benito Vicetto Pérez (Ferrol, Spain, 21 May 1824 - Ferrol, 28 May 1878) was a Galician journalist, historian, playwright and novelist.

As a historian, his main work was the Historia de Galicia (1865). He wrote stories and comedies in Spanish, as well as three poems in Galician language. Vicetto's work contributed to a resurgence of Galician culture, known as the rexurdimento.
