= Bregano =

- Frazione
- Location of Bregano in Italy
- Coordinates: 45°50′N 8°41′E
- Country: Italy
- Region: Lombardy
- Province: Province of Varese (VA)
- Comune: Bardello con Malgesso e Bregano

Area
  - Total: 2.3 km^{2} (0.89 sq mi)

Population (Dec. 2004)
  - Total: 750
  - Density: 330/km^{2} (840/sq mi)
- Time zone: UTC+1 (CET)
  - Summer (DST): UTC+2 (CEST)
- Postal code: 21020
- Dialing code: 0322

Bregano is a frazione (hamlet) of the comune (municipality) of Bardello con Malgesso e Bregano, in the Province of Varese in the Italian region Lombardy. It is located about 60 kilometres (37 mi) northwest of Milan and about 12 kilometres (7 mi) west of Varese. As of 31 December 2004, it had a population of 750 and an area of 2.3 square kilometres (0.89 mi^{2}). It had been a comune until 1 January 2023, when it merged with Bardello and Malgesso, and became part the newborn comune of Bardello con Malgesso e Bregano.

== Demographic evolution ==
Historical population

Year	Pop.	±%
1861	324	—
1871	334	+3.1%
1881	375	+12.3%
1901	400	+6.7%
1911	448	+12.0%

Year	Pop.	±%
1921	407	−9.2%
1931	384	−5.7%
1936	315	−18.0%
1951	368	+16.8%
1961	420	+14.1%

Year	Pop.	±%
1971	439	+4.5%
1981	539	+22.8%
1991	652	+21.0%
2001	726	+11.3%

Source: Data from ISTAT
