= Mario Artali =

Italian politician (1938–2023)

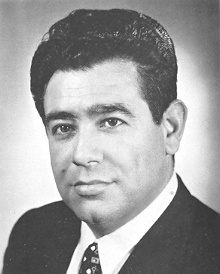
- Artali in 1972

Member of the Chamber of Deputies of Italy
- In office 16 May 1972 – 4 July 1976
- Constituency: Lombardy

Personal details
- Born: 18 November 1938 Bologna, Italy
- Died: 1 January 2023 (aged 84) Milan, Italy
- Party: PSI
- Education: University of Milan
- Occupation: Businessman

Mario Artali (18 November 1938 – 1 January 2023) was an Italian businessman and politician. A member of the Italian Socialist Party, he served in the Chamber of Deputies from 1972 to 1976.

Artali died in Milan on 1 January 2023, at the age of 84.
