= Benito Chávez Montenegro =

Mexican politician (born 1947)

- Born: 2 July 1947 (age 78); Jalisco, Mexico
- Occupation: Politician
- Political party: PRI

Benito Chávez Montenegro (born 2 July 1947) is a Mexican politician affiliated with the Institutional Revolutionary Party. As of 2014 he served as Deputy of the LIX Legislature of the Mexican Congress representing Jalisco as replacement of Javier Guízar Macías.
