= Benito Corghi =

Italian truck driver

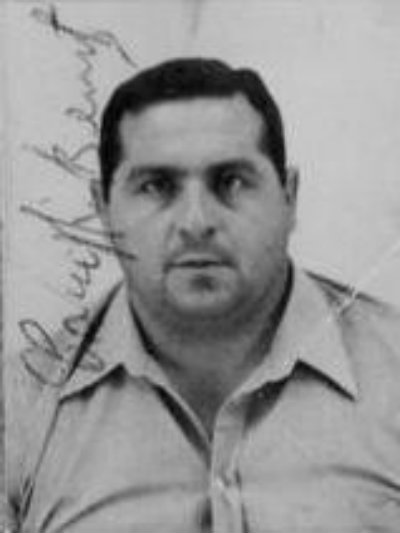
- Born: 26 May 1938
- Died: 5 August 1976 (aged 38)
- Occupation: Long-distance truck driver

Benito Corghi (26 May 1938 – 5 August 1976) was an Italian long-distance truck driver, who was shot to death by the Border Troops of the German Democratic Republic when entering East Germany. He was the only non-German ever killed at the inner German border.

== Background ==
Benito Corghi was an Italian long-distance truck driver. In the morning of 5 August 1976 he crossed the border crossing at Hirschberg/Rudolphstein at the Bundesautobahn 9 into West Germany. After parking his truck on the West German side, he attempted to walk back to the East German side to pick up some papers he forgot. This was not allowed. When a guard shouted at him and ordered him to raise his hands, he did not understand, turned around and attempted to walk back, whereupon he was shot.

Corghi was a member of the Italian Communist Party, and his death severely embarrassed the East German authorities. On the next day, the authorities of the GDR formally apologized for the "tragic accident". It was the only time in GDR history that such a formal apology was issued for a deadly occurrence along the inner-German border.

The shooter was acquitted in 1994 by the District Court (Landgericht) of Gera.

Corghi remains the only non-German killed at the inner German border.
