= Malgesso =

- Comune
- Comune di Malgesso
- Location within Italy Location within Lombardy
- Coordinates: 45°50′N 8°40′E
- Country: Italy
- Region: Lombardy
- Province: Province of Varese (VA)

Area
  - Total: 2.8 km^{2} (1.1 sq mi)

Population (Dec. 2004)
  - Total: 1,253
  - Density: 450/km^{2} (1,200/sq mi)
- Demonym: Malgessesi
- Time zone: UTC+1 (CET)
  - Summer (DST): UTC+2 (CEST)
- Postal code: 21023
- Dialing code: 0332

Malgesso is a comune (municipality) in the Province of Varese in the Italian region Lombardy, located about 60 kilometres (37 mi) northwest of Milan and about 13 kilometres (8 mi) west of Varese. As of 31 December 2004, it had a population of 1,253 and an area of 2.8 square kilometres (1.1 mi^{2}).

Malgesso borders the following municipalities: Bardello, Besozzo, Brebbia, Bregano, Travedona-Monate.

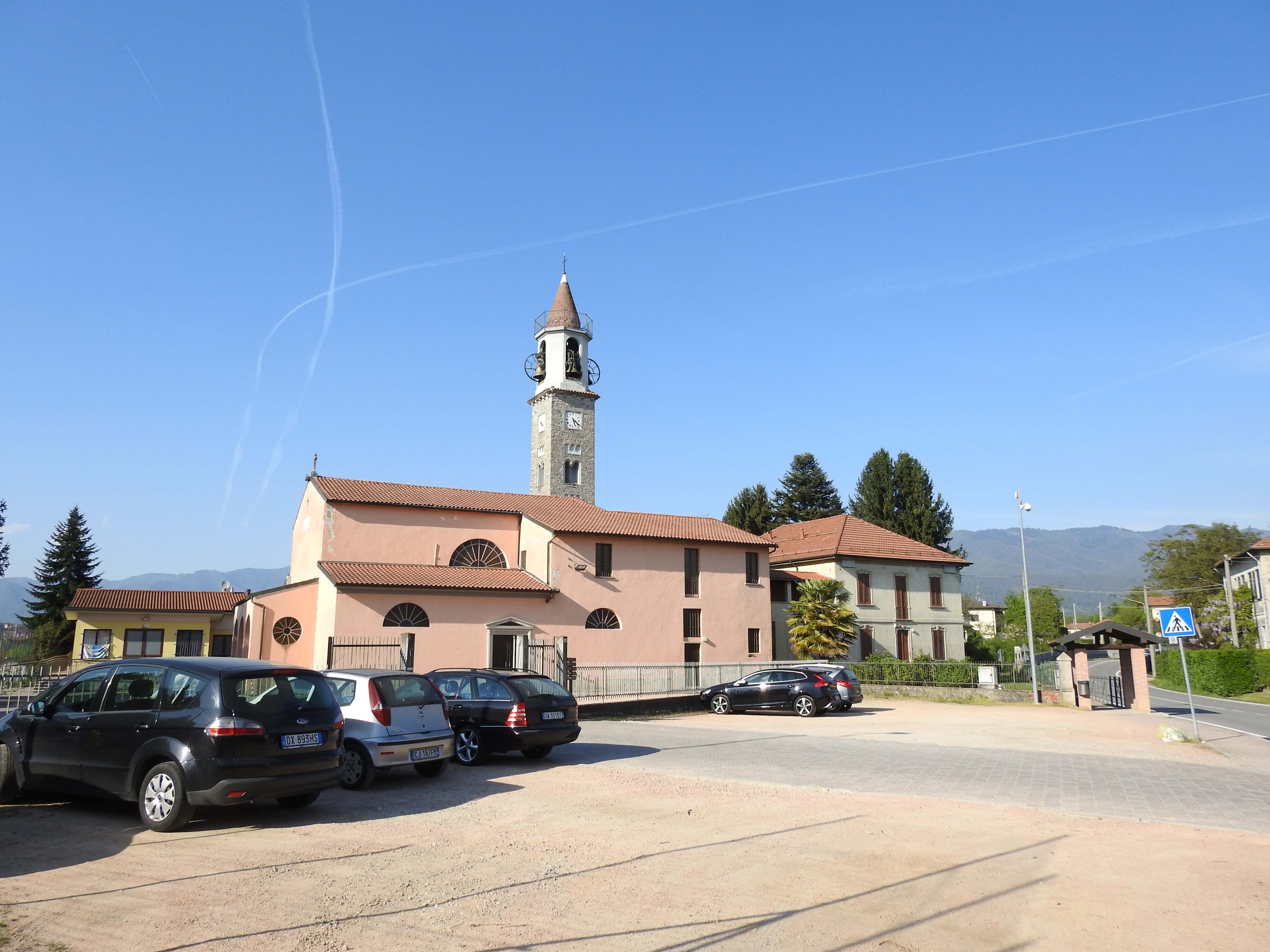

== Demographic evolution ==
Historical population

Year	Pop.	±%
1861	450	—
1871	516	+14.7%
1881	669	+29.7%
1901	843	+26.0%
1911	820	−2.7%

Year	Pop.	±%
1921	768	−6.3%
1931	654	−14.8%
1936	597	−8.7%
1951	581	−2.7%
1961	673	+15.8%

Year	Pop.	±%
1971	853	+26.7%
1981	1,005	+17.8%
1991	998	−0.7%
2001	1,113	+11.5%

Source: Data from ISTAT
