= Achille Ottaviani =

Italian journalist and politician (1950–2023)

Member of the Senate of the Republic of Italy
- In office 23 April 1992 – 14 April 1994

Personal details
- Born: 12 October 1950 Verona, Italy
- Died: 2 June 2023 (aged 72) Verona, Italy
- Party: LN
- Occupation: Journalist

Achille Ottaviani (12 October 1950 – 2 June 2023) was an Italian journalist and politician.

== Biography ==
A member of the Lega Nord, Ottaviani served in the Senate of the Republic from 1992 to 1994.

Ottaviani died in Verona on 2 June 2023, at the age of 72.
