= Pio D'Emilia =

Italian journalist and historian (1975–2023)

- Born: Pio D'Emilia; 18 July 1954; Rome, Italy
- Died: 7 February 2023 (aged 68); Tokyo, Japan
- Education: Keio University
- Alma mater: University of Rome
- Occupations: Journalist, writer
- Years active: 1975–2023
- Known for: Journalist employed by Sky TG24
- Notable work: The book "Nuclear Tsunami"

Pio D'Emilia (18 July 1954 – 7 February 2023) was an Italian journalist and writer employed by Sky TG24.

== Biography ==
=== Journalistic career ===
D'Emilia was a correspondent for Sky TG24 in Japan and author of several articles in Italian and foreign newspapers such as Avvenire, Il Messaggero, il manifesto, Tokyo Shimbun and Shukan Shincho.

==== Special reporter to Fukushima ====
Following the 2011 Tōhoku earthquake and tsunami, D'Emilia was the only foreign journalist to go to the Fukushima Nuclear Power Plant and documented the disaster area for thirty days. In June of the same year, he published the book "Nuclear Tsunami", from which the documentary "Fukushima: A Nuclear Story" directed by Matteo Gagliardi was subsequently taken.

==== C’era una volta il Giappone ====
The latest analysis "C’era una volta il Giappone" on Japan by Pio d'Emilia sent two days before his death to Guido Moltedo, director of the Ytali website, has represented his journalistic and political testament.
