= Bardello =

- Frazione
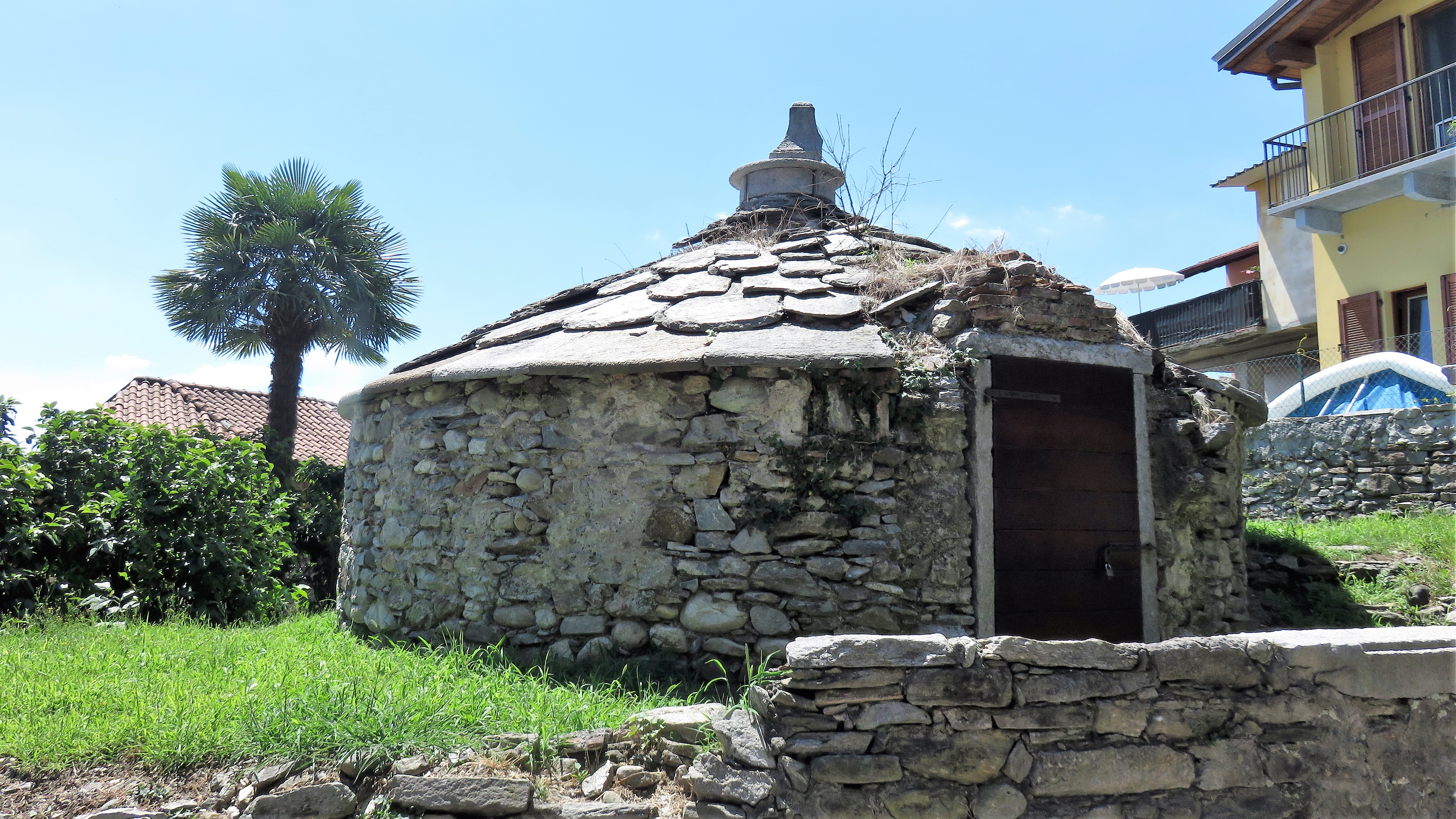
- View of Bardello

- Coat of arms

- Location of Bardello in Italy
- Coordinates: 45°50′N 08°42′E
- Country: Italy
- Region: Lombardy
- Province: Varese (VA)
- Comune: Bardello con Malgesso e Bregano

Area
  - Total: 2 km^{2} (0.77 sq mi)

Population
  - Total: 1,218
  - Density: 610/km^{2} (1,600/sq mi)
- Time zone: UTC+1 (CET)
  - Summer (DST): UTC+2 (CEST)
- Postal code: 21020
- Dialing code: 0332

Bardello is a frazione (hamlet) of the comune (municipality) of Bardello con Malgesso e Bregano. It is located in the province of Varese, in the Lombardy region of northern Italy. It had been an autonomous comune until 1 January 2023, when it merged with Bregano and Malgesso, establishing the comune of Bardello con Malgesso e Bregano.
