= Benito Gutmacher =

Argentine actor

Benito Gutmacher (born 13 February 1950, Buenos Aires) son of Jewish Polish immigrants, is an actor, author and theatre and film director. In 1971, he went to Paris where he presented his one-man show "Le Cri du Corps". Since then, he has been acting for more than 40 years in many European theaters and festivals.

== Biography ==
Benito Gutmacher followed theatre courses in Buenos Aires with Juan Carlos Gené. He made his debut as an actor in 1970 with "Sergeant Musgrave's Dance" by John Arden. Inspired by the theories of Antonin Artaud and the dancer Iris Scaccheri, he travelled to Paris in 1971 where he presented his one-man show Le cri du corps ("The Cry of the Body") which received a positive review in Le Monde. After that, he acted during more than 30 years in theatres and festivals in France, Europe, Latin America and the USA. In 1972, he played at the Théâtre des Nations in Paris under the direction of Jean-Louis Barrault. In 1975, after a performance at the Teatro Regina in Buenos Aires, he was mentioned in the newspaper Clarín as one of the best actors of the year. In 1978, he met Alejandro Jodorowsky who suggested presenting his show Tarot in Paris. In 1990, he performed at the La MaMa Experimental Theatre Club in New York and was described in The New York Times as "a virtuoso of movement".

Gutmacher settled definitively in Europe where he worked for 15 years with Hector Malamud and Carlos Trafic. In Germany, he presented more than 25 plays with independent groups. In 1991, he directed "Paradise Later", a one-man show by Stephan Schulberg, member of The Living Theatre. In 2020, he wrote and directed the feature film: "The Man in the Café", starring Carlos Trafic (co-Author screenplay) and Araceli Fernandez González. The film was release 2021 in Vimeo as well as in different Film Festivals on the Internet. Gutmacher has been directing dozens of courses and workshops in Germany, France and Switzerland. Since 1981 he lives in Freiburg, Germany. He is married and has four children and 9 grandchildren.

== One man shows ==
- Le Cri du Corps (Paris, 1972)
- Hamlet 74 (Paris, 1974)
- Tarot (Paris, 1980)
- Business-Business (Freiburg im Breisgau, Germany, 1983)
- Art and Toilet Paper (Freiburg im Breisgau, 1997)
