= Dante Stefani =

Italian partisan and politician (1927–2023)

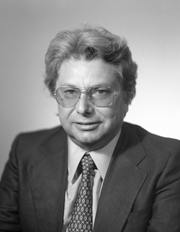

Member of the Senate of the Republic of Italy
- In office 20 June 1979 – 1 July 1987
- Constituency: Emilia-Romagna

Personal details
- Born: 19 September 1927 Bologna, Italy
- Died: 3 February 2023 (aged 95) Bologna, Italy
- Party: PCI
- Occupation: Technical designer

Dante Stefani (19 September 1927 – 3 February 2023) was an Italian partisan and politician. A member of the Italian Communist Party, he served in the Senate of the Republic from 1979 to 1987.

Stefani died in the Bologna on 3 February 2023, at the age of 95.
