= Pino Roveredo =

Italian writer and theatre director (1954–2023)

- Born: 16 October 1954; Trieste, Italy
- Died: 21 January 2023 (aged 68); Duino-Aurisina, Italy
- Occupations: Writer; Theatre director

Pino Roveredo (16 October 1954 – 21 January 2023) was an Italian writer and theatre director.

== Works ==
=== Novels and essays ===
- Capriole in salita (1996)
- Una risata piena di finestre (1997)
- La città dei cancelli (1998)
- La bela vita (1998)
- Ballando con Cecilia (2000)
- Centro diurno/Le fa male qui? (2000)
- San Martino al Campo - Trent'anni (2000)
- Schizzi di vino in brodo (2001)
- Cara Trieste (2004)
- Mandami a dire (2005)
- Andar per fodere/Un giro tra le pieghe di Trieste (2006)
- Caracreatura (2007)
- Vis-à-vis (2007)
- Attenti alle rose (2009)
- La melodia del corvo (2010)
- Mio padre votava Berlinguer (2012)
- La rielaborazione di Ballando con Cecilia (2013)
- Mastica e sputa (2016)

=== Theatre director ===
- La bela vita
- Centro diurno
- Le fa male qui?
- Sarà il paradiso...
- L'ultima corsa
- Mercoledì
- Ballando con cecilia
- Le chiavi di Melara
- Volevo tanto dirti che..
- Cari estinti
- La pankina
- Capriole in salita
- Caracreatura
- Succo d'aceto
- D...come Donna
- La melodia del corvo
- La legge è uguale per tutti?
- Quarto binario
