= Elettra Deiana =

Italian politician (1941–2023)

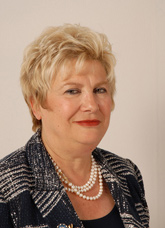
- Deiana in 2006

Member of the Chamber of Deputies of Italy
- In office 30 May 2001 – 28 April 2008
- Constituency: Lazio 1 (2001–2006); Lazio 2 (2006–2008)

Personal details
- Born: 23 May 1941 Cagliari, Italy
- Died: 4 February 2023 (aged 81) Rome, Italy
- Party: PRC
- Education: Sapienza University of Rome
- Occupation: Teacher

Elettra Deiana (23 May 1941 – 4 February 2023) was an Italian teacher and politician. A member of the Communist Refoundation Party, she served in the Chamber of Deputies from 2001 to 2008.

Deiana died in Rome on 4 February 2023, at the age of 81.
