= Giovanni Bettini (politician) =

Italian politician (1938–2023)

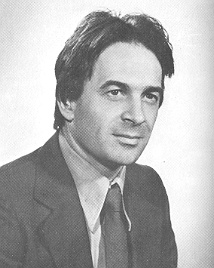
- Bettini in 1979

Member of the Chamber of Deputies of Italy
- In office 20 June 1979 – 11 July 1983
- Constituency: Como-Sondrio-Varese

Personal details
- Born: 10 March 1938 Sondrio, Italy
- Died: 10 February 2023 (aged 84) Sondrio, Italy
- Party: PCI
- Education: Polytechnic University of Milan
- Occupation: Architect

Giovanni Bettini (10 March 1938 – 10 February 2023) was an Italian architect and politician. A member of the Italian Communist Party, he served in the Chamber of Deputies from 1979 to 1983.

Bettini died in Sondrio on 10 February 2023, at the age of 84.

== Biography ==
In 1968, he graduated from the School of Architecture at the Polytechnic University of Milan.

During his academic career, he taught urban planning at the Faculty of Architecture of the Polytechnic University of Milan; he also taught advanced courses at the University of Bergamo on the topic of “Water and Landscape” and led seminars at the University of Grenoble. He was a member of the National Institute of Urban Planning and served on the Scientific Committee of the Stelvio National Park and the Scientific Committee of IREALP. As one of the founders of Legambiente in Valtellina, he was a member of the association’s National Scientific Committee. He produced documentation and analyses on the transformations of the Valtellina landscape.

He was elected to the Chamber of Deputies in 1979 as a member of the Italian Communist Party, representing the Como-Sondrio-Varese constituency, and served in the Chamber throughout the 8th Legislature, which ended in 1983.
