= Benito Salas =

Benito Salas may refer to:

- Benito Salas Vargas (died 1816), Colombian patriot who fought in the Spanish reconquest of New Granada
- Benito Salas Airport, an airport in Neiva, Colombia, named after Benito Salas Vargas
