= Benito J. Legarda =

Filipino historian and economist (1926–2020)

- Born: Benito Justo Legarda y Fernández; August 6, 1926; Philippine Islands
- Died: August 26, 2020 (aged 94)
- Education: Georgetown University (BA); Harvard University (MA, PhD)
- Occupations: Historian and economist

Benito Justo Legarda, Jr. (August 6, 1926 – August 26, 2020) was a Filipino historian and economist who became a Deputy Governor of the Bangko Sentral ng Pilipinas.
