= Benito Martinez =

Benito Martinez may refer to:

- Benito Martínez (longevity claimant) (died 2006), Cuban who claimed to be the world's oldest living person
- Benito Martínez (militant) (died 1864), military commander in the Dominican Restoration War
- Benito Martinez (actor) (born 1970), American actor
- Benito Martinez (soldier) (1932–1952), American soldier, Korean War Medal of Honor recipient
- Bad Bunny (born 1994), Puerto Rican singer
