= Benito Huerta =

American artist (born 1952)

- Born: 1952 (age 73–74); Corpus Christi, Texas, U.S.
- Occupations: Artist; professor

Benito Huerta (born 1952) is an American artist and professor at the University of Texas Arlington. Huerta was born in Corpus Christi, Texas.

His work is included in the collections of the Museum of Fine Arts Houston, the Amon Carter Museum, the Blanton Museum of Art, and the Menil Collection.
