= Filippo Mordani =

Italian writer

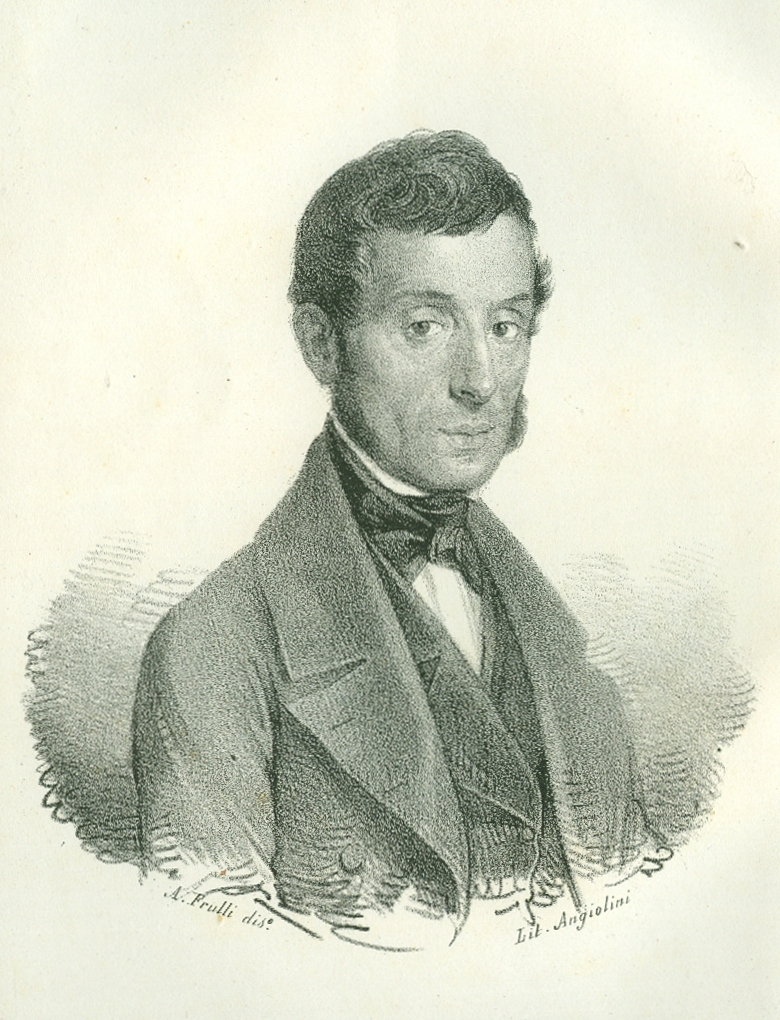
Mordani

Filippo Mordani (8 September 1797, Ravenna – 20 September 1886, Forlì) was an Italian writer and nationalist. The state primary school in the centre of Ravenna is named after him – it houses a 2009 inscription and a 2014 bust of him.

== Life ==
The third son of Antonio Mordani and Annunziata Mazzotti, from 1815 to 1820 he attended college in Ravenna, studying rhetoric, literature and philosophy under the philologist Pellegrino Farini. His family wished him to become a notary, but he refused and instead concentrated on studying Italian and Latin literature. During this period he translated several works, including Girolamo Rossi's Historiarum Ravennatum libri decem and several classical works by Seneca, Plutarch and Theocritus.

In May 1827 he became a grammar teacher in Ravenna's gymnasium. In 1841 he was granted an honorary diploma by the Accademia Ravegnana di Belle Arti thanks to his earlier writings. In October 1842 he won the competition to be chair of eloquence at the college on the retirement of Dionigi Strocchi from the post. This faced some opposition due to his involvement in the 1831 risings and so he only began teaching in January 1843. He was elected a member of the Roman Constituent Assembly of 1849 to represent Ravenna but following for his vote against the maintenance of the church's temporal power he was excluded from teaching and later jailed and exiled from the Papal States. He moved to live in Florence, where he spent five years before returning to Ravenna in 1855 thanks to the mediation of Giuseppe Pasolini. In 1859 he took part in the Romagna Assembly as deputy for Ravenna in the first college.

== Works ==
- Raccolta delle composizioni poetiche 1820
- Composizioni poetiche 1825
- Vite di Cristoforo Rossi e di monsignor Giuseppe Mazzotti ravegnati 1826
- Biografie e ritratti di uomini illustri romagnoli 1834
- Tre novelle storiche 1839
- Elogio storico di Salomone Gessner 1840
- Elogio storico di Giorgio Lord Byron 1841
- Prose varie 1842
- Prose 1847
- Appendice prima delle Prose 1863
- Iscrizioni 1865
- Vita di Luigi Rossini architetto e incisore 1865
- Commentario degli studi e de' costumi di Luigi Bufalini cesenate 1866
- Vita di Jacopo Landoni 1868
- Vita di Alessandro Cappi 1868
- Vita di Gaetano Monti 1869
- Nuove iscrizioni 1869
- Alcune lettere inedite 1870
- Della vita privata di Giovacchino Rossini. Memorie inedite 1871
- Operette 1874
- Lettera inedita di Gasparo Garatoni ravennate 1878
- Lettere famigliari inedite 1880

== Bibliography ==
- (in Italian) Biographical dictionary entry
- (in Italian) Gianfranco Stella, 'Filippo Mordani', in Quaderni ravennati, Illustri Ravennati del secolo scorso, 1987, p. 157.
- (in Italian) Rassegna storica del Risorgimento, 1936, p. 622.
