= Gianfranco Goberti =

Italian painter (1939–2023)

Gianfranco Goberti (19 November 1939 – 22 January 2023) was an Italian painter.

== Life and career ==
Goberti was born in Ferrara on 19 November 1939. After studying Arts at the Institut Dosso Dossi in Ferrara, Italy, and at the Academy of Art in Bologna, he was teacher and Director of the Institut of Arts Dosso Dossi. His first exhibition was held in 1959 with references to Pablo Picasso and Francis Bacon. His research dealt with nuova figurazione and Abstract Expressionism. The first optical-figurative period starts during the 1960s. In 1980, he was selected by the National Catalogue of Modern Art Bolaffi together with Paolini, Adami, Bulgarelli, Cassano and Paladino. Goberti has held exhibitions at the International Art Expo of Bilbao, Quadriennale d'Arte in Rome, Rassegna Premio S. Fedele (Milan), Arte Fiera (Bologna), Altissima (Turin), Expo Arte (Bari), ArteExpo (Barcelona), and LineArt (Ghent), "La Venere svelata – La Venere di Urbino di Tiziano" (Brussels, Centre for Fine Arts, 10/10/2003-11/01/2004, Festival Internazionale EUROPALIA).

Vittorio Sgarbi wrote about the Goberti's art:

"Is the Goberti's art the element which should arouse new interest in our way of looking at and co-living with what is around us? Is maybe his technical ability? … The dominant aspect of the Goberti's art is the relationship between the Art and what it has been traditionally considered its subject, the Nature. ... The Art has always its specific language and a human substance even when it would camouflage in the Nature. This is the lesson, the revision of our mode of being in the world what Gianfranco Goberti proposes us."

Goberti died on 23 January 2023, at the age of 83.

== Solo exhibitions ==
- 1959 – Teatro Comunale, Ferrara
- 1961 – Il Chiostro di San Romano, Ferrara
- 1962 – Galleria Panfilio, Ferrara
- 1963 – Galleria Benedetti, Legnago
- 1967 – Galleria Due Mondi, Roma; Galleria Il Saggittario, Bari; Galleria Duemila, Bologna
- 1969 – Galleria San Vitale, Ravenna
- 1970 – Galleria il Taghetto, Venice
- 1971 – Galleria Carbonesi, Bologna
- 1972 – Galleria Estense, Ferrara
- 1977 – Galleria Duemila, Bologna
- 1978 – Galleria Schubert, Milan; Accademia dei Concordi, Rovigo
- 1979 – Galleria Ipermedia, Ferrara
- 1983 – Galleria Andromeda, Trento; Drazek Art Gallery, Munich
- 1984 – Galleria Schubert, Milan; Palazzo Del Governo, Pesaro; Galleria Civica, Codigoro; Palazzo Diamanti, Ferrara
- 1985 – Galleria Spazio Uno, Madaloni
- 1986 – Palazzo Pretorio, Certaldo; Palazzo Ducale, Urbino
- 1987 – Galleria Schubert, Milan
- 1989 – Rocca Possente, Stellata, Bondeno; Palazzo del Governatore, Cento
- 1990 – Palazzo Comunale Nonantola; Galleria Cristina Busi, Chiavari; Galleria Dosso Dossi, Ferrara
- 1992 – Galleria Schubert, Milan
- 1994 – Galleria L'Ariete, Bologna; Galleria Schubert, Milan
- 1996 – Galerie BSMD, La Decouverte, Parigi; Galleria Schubert, Milan
- 1997 – Galleria Gnaccarini, Bologna; Sala Comunale "O. Marchesi", Copparo
- 1998 – Galleria Schubert, Milan
- 2000 – BezaArte, Ferrara
- 2001 – Galleria Conforti, Cava dei Tirreni, Salerno; Galleria Schubert, Milan
- 2002 – Galleria Roggia Grande, Trento; Galleria Fantasio & Joe, Lucca; Delizia del Verginese, Portomaggiore, Ferrara
- 2004 – Galleria Del Carbone, Ferrara
- 2005 – Galleria Palestro, Ferrara; Galleria "Dosso Dossi", Ferrara
- 2008 – Galleria Arte Antica Bruschelli, Perugia
- 2009 – Le carpe sacre di Sanli Urfa, Galleria "del Carbone", Ferrara
- 2011 – Incontri d'Autore: #1, Galleria del Carbone, Ferrara; Il nodo del tempo, conversazione tra arte, filosofia e scienza. In: Notte dei ricercatori, September 23, 2011. A cura di: Davide Bassi, Marco Bertozzi, Gianfranco Goberti, University of Ferrara.
- 2014 – Palazzo Turchi Di Bagno, Sistema Museale di Ateneo of the University of Ferrara, Ferrara; Opere leggere, studio dell'artista, Ferrara
- 2015 – 60.10.50, Galleria del Carbone, Ferrara

== Group art exhibitions ==
- 1965 – Quadriennale d'Arte di Roma
- 1969 – Rassegna Premio S. Fedele, Milan
- 1978, 1985, 2001 – Arte Fiera, Bologna
- 1979 – Expo Arte, Bari
- 1982 – Feria Internacional de Muestras, Bilbao
- 2000 – Artissima, Torino
- – ArteExpo, Barcellona
- 2003/2004 – LineArt (Gand), "La Venere svelata – La Venere di Urbino di Tiziano", Palais des Beaux-Arts, 10/10/2003-11/01/2004, Festival Internazionale EUROPALIA, Brussels
- 2003 – Arte in Italia negli anni '70, Polo Umanistico, Erice (TP)
- 2007 – Nuovo spazio: Inaugurazione, MLB Home Gallery, Ferrara
- 2008 – Sebastiano tra sacro e profano, Monica Benini Arte, Ferrara; Pinacoteca G. Cattabriga, Bondeno (FE)
- 2009 – Generazioni, Istituto d'Arte/Liceo Artistico Dosso Dossi, Ferrara
- 2009 – Il cielo alla rovescia, Galleria del Carbone, Ferrara
- 2010 – RTA: progetto Porta degli Angeli, Ferrara
- 2011 – 54° Biennale di Venezia, Padiglione Italia, Rome, Palazzo Venezia, selected artists by the Fondazione Roma
- 2012 – Ulisse Gallery, PERFHUMANCE: odori e viste attorno all’uomo, Ugo Attardi, Gianfranco Goberti, Sidival Fila, Giorgio Galli, Rome; Omaggio a Michelangelo Antonioni dagli amici della Galleria del Carbone, Galleria del Carbone (Ferrara)
- 2013 – Angeli contemporanei, Galleria del Carbone (Ferrara); Künstler aus Ferrara, Italien, KREIS Galerie (Nürnberg)
- 2014 – Nutrire la Pace, energia della vita, Sotheby's; Enrico Berlinguer e lo sguardo degli artisti, Camera dei Deputati, Roma; Galleria Civica of Andalo (Trento); Scandito ad Arte, Galleria del Carbone (Ferrara)
- 2015 – Ombre della memoria con Flavia Franceschini, Ulisse Gallery, Roma; Acqua, farina, lievito... pane, Galleria Il Ponte, Pieve di Cento

== Sources ==
- Vittorio Sgarbi, Catalogo Palazzo Ducale, Urbino, 1985.
- Vittorio Sgarbi, Gli assenti hanno sempre ragione. L'Europeo, 12 July 1986.
- Rapidofine Bologna, Grafis 1986.
- Maria Luce Tommasi, Quei nodi inestricabili che stanno dentro di noi: una grande mostra di Goberti a Urbino, Ferrara, n. 5, 1986.
- Lucio Scardino, Officinaottanta, Ferrara, Liberty House, 1986.
- Gabriele Turola, Goberti, ironia graffiante per discutere il concetto di realtà, Ferrara, n. 8/9, 1987.
- Natalia Aspesi, Tra Matti e Bagatti, La Repubblica, 19 settembre 1987.
- Vittorio Sgarbi, catalogo Galleria Schubert, Milan 1987.
- Lucio Scardino, Per Schifanoia, Ferrara, Liberty House, 1987.
- Franco Solmi, Il tarocco come espressione d'arte, in Le Carte di Corte, La Nuova Alfa Editoriale, 1987.
- Lauro Manni, Goberti: trent'anni di avanguardia, La Piazza, n. 12, 1988.
- Vittorio Sgarbi, Goberti, Rosen, catalogo Rocca Possente di Stellata, 1989.
- King, mensile, ottobre 1989
- Eleonora Di cicco, Il tappeto come opera d'arte, Interni Annual, 1989.
- Bernard Wider, Goberti pittore ferrarese, catalogo Rocca Possente di Stellata, 1989.
- Fausto Gozzi, Intervista a Goberti in polaroid, catalogo Rocca Possente di Stellata, 1989.
- Oreste Zoboli, Goberti, Rosen, La Nuova Gazzetta di Modena, 17 January 1990.
- Gilberto Pellizzola, catalogo Galleria Cristina Busi, Chiavari, 1990.
- Vittorio Sgarbi, Gianfranco Goberti, tra reale e irreale, Art Leader, January–February 1992.
- Antonio Carbè, Goberti, la corda del desiderio, Leadership Medica, n. 1,1993.
- Lorenzo Bonini, catalogo Galleria L'Ariete, Bologna, 1994.
- Lorenzo Bonini, catalogo Galleria Schubert, Milan, 1994.
- Roberto Vitali, Mongolfiera, periodico, Bologna, 4 March 1994.
- Lorenzo Bonini, Colloquio con un artista del nostro tempo, Art Leader, n. 17, March–April 1994.
- Flaminio Gualdoni, catalogo Padiglione Arte Contemporanea, Ferrara, 1994–95.
- Vittorio Sgarbi, ll nostro modo di essere nel mondo, Grazia, 12 February 1995.
- Vittorio Sgarbi, La tensione lineare di Goberti, L'Italiano, Silvia Di Stefano, GB progetti, June 1996.
- Vittorio Sgarbi, Le trame della pittura, Quadri e Sculture, December 1996 – January 1997.
- Vittorio Sgarbi, Flaminio Gualdoni, 2000. Gianfranco Goberti: evasioni coatte. Editore L'Artiere Edizioni Italia, 18 tav. col., 50 pp.
