= Mario Telò =

Italian scholar (1950–2023)

Mario Telò (3 August 1950 – 6 March 2023) was an Italian political scientist and researcher born in Cremona who focused on European studies, political theory and international relations.

Telò was a researcher and professor in many European, Asian and American universities. Since 1995, Telò was the “J.Monnet Chair ad personam”, and, since 2006, a member of the Royal Academies for Science and the Arts of Belgium

Telò taught ‘European Institutions’ and ‘Comparative regionalism’ at LUISS University and LUISS School of Government, Rome. He also taught ‘International Relations’ at the Free University of Brussels, where he was emeritus president of the Institut d’Etudes Européennes, central coordinator of the “GEM international Phd School” and senior scholar of “GR:EEN”, an international integrated research project.

Telò was the author or editor of 29 books and more than 100 scientific articles and is part of the international debate about the European Union.

Telò died on 6 March 2023, at the age of 72.

== Sources ==
- Google Scholar Citations
- L'Europe en crise et le monde
- Routledge Series: Globalisation, Europe, and Multilateralism - Book Series - Routledge & CRC Press
- European Union and New Regionalism. Competing Regionalism and Global Governance:
- European Union and New Regionalism: Competing Regionalism and Global Governance in a Post-Hegemonic Era
- GEM PhD School: Erasmusmundus Gem
