= Lake Maggiore boat incident =

Boating incident in Northern Italy

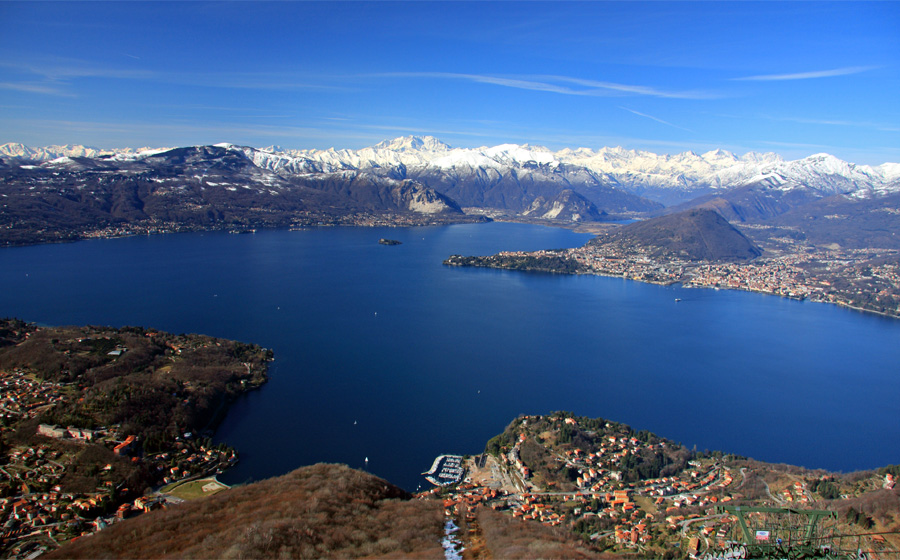
- Lake Maggiore in 2009
- Date: 28 May 2023
- Location: Lake Maggiore, Italy
- Deaths: 4

On 28 May 2023, houseboat Gooduria capsized in the Northern Italian Lake Maggiore, killing four people amongst the twenty-three on board. The incident attracted attention when it became clear that almost all of the people on board were associated with the Italian and Israeli national intelligence agencies.

Out of the four people who died, two had been currently working for the Italian Intelligence Service, and one for the Mossad. All people on board, except the captain and his wife, were employees or ex-employees of intelligence or defence services. The ten Israeli survivors were flown back to Israel on a military aircraft before questioning could take place.

The meeting on the boat had initially been described as a birthday party. Later reports connected the meeting to a joint operation relating to "Iranian non-conventional weapons capabilities". The agents had been investigating local industry and Russian residents of the region with ties to the Iranian military.

At the funeral of the Israeli agent, which was held in Ashkelon four days after the incident, Mossad director David Barnea gave a eulogy.
