= Benito Contreras =

Mexican footballer (1905-1972)

Personal information
- Date of birth: 16 May 1905
- Date of death: July 1972 (aged 66–67)

International career
Years	Team	Apps	(Gls)
- Mexico

Benito Contreras (16 May 1905 – July 1972) was a Mexican footballer. He competed in the men's tournament at the 1928 Summer Olympics.
