= Alberto Benito =

Alberto Benito may refer to:

- Alberto Benito (footballer, born 1972), Spanish retired footballer
- Alberto Benito (footballer, born 1992), Spanish footballer
