= Benito Andion =

Mexican diplomat

Benito Andión Sancho is the United Nations Special Envoy to Facilitate Dialogue in El Salvador. Prior to his appointment on 16 January 2017, by United Nations Secretary-General António Guterres, he was Ambassador of Mexico to Israel.

== Career ==
Andión is a graduate of the Ministry of Defence University and holds a master's degree in military administration. In addition, he holds a law degree from La Salle University.

From 2012 to 2015, Andión was Mexico's Ambassador to Portugal. Prior to this, he held several positions in the Ministry of Foreign Relations of Mexico including Director for South America and Coordinator for International Security Cooperation, Head of the Western Europe Department and Assistant Director General for Europe. From 2005 to 2008 he was the Consul General of Mexico in Milan. From 1998 to 2001 he was Mexico's Ambassador to Honduras. He received the Order of José Matías Delgado from the government of El Salvador.
