= Giuseppina Bersani =

Italian fencer (1949–2023)

Personal information
- Born: 27 August 1949 Piacenza, Italy
- Died: 3 February 2023 (aged 73) Piacenza, Italy

Sport
- Sport: Fencing

Giuseppina Bersani (27 August 1949 – 3 February 2023) was an Italian fencer. She competed in the women's team foil event at the 1972 Summer Olympics.

Bersani died in Piacenza on 3 February 2023, at the age of 73.
