= Benito Pavoni =

Italian politician (1936–2023)

Member of the Chamber of Deputies of Italy
- In office 29 June 1987 – 22 April 1992
- Constituency: Verona

Personal details
- Born: 19 July 1936 Sant'Ambrogio di Valpolicella, Italy
- Died: 8 May 2023 (aged 86)
- Party: PSI

Benito Pavoni (19 July 1936 – 8 May 2023) was an Italian politician. A member of the Italian Socialist Party, he served in the Chamber of Deputies from 1987 to 1992.

Pavoni died on 8 May 2023, at the age of 86.
