= Benito Bollati =

Italian lawyer and politician (1926–2023)

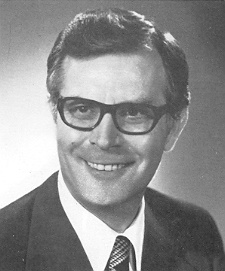
- Bollati in 1976

Member of the Chamber of Deputies of Italy
- In office 29 May 1974 – 19 June 1979
- Constituency: Milan

Personal details
- Born: 14 March 1926 Canegrate, Italy
- Died: 24 January 2023 (aged 96) Milan, Italy
- Party: MSI
- Education: University of Milan
- Occupation: Lawyer

Benito Bollati (14 March 1926 – 24 January 2023) was an Italian lawyer and politician. A member of the Italian Social Movement, he served in the Chamber of Deputies from 1974 to 1979.

Bollati died in Milan on 24 January 2023, at the age of 96.
