= Giorgio Tombesi =

Italian politician (1926–2023)

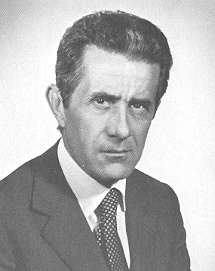

Member of the Chamber of Deputies of Italy
- In office 26 June 1976 – 11 July 1983
- Constituency: Trieste

Personal details
- Born: 22 March 1926 Udine, Italy
- Died: 3 January 2023 (aged 96) Trieste, Italy
- Party: DC

Giorgio Tombesi (22 March 1926 – 3 January 2023) was an Italian politician. A member of the Christian Democracy party, he served in the Chamber of Deputies from 1976 to 1983.

Tombesi died in Trieste on 3 January 2023, at the age of 96.
