= Bardello con Malgesso e Bregano =

- Comune
- Comune di Bardello con Malgesso e Bregano
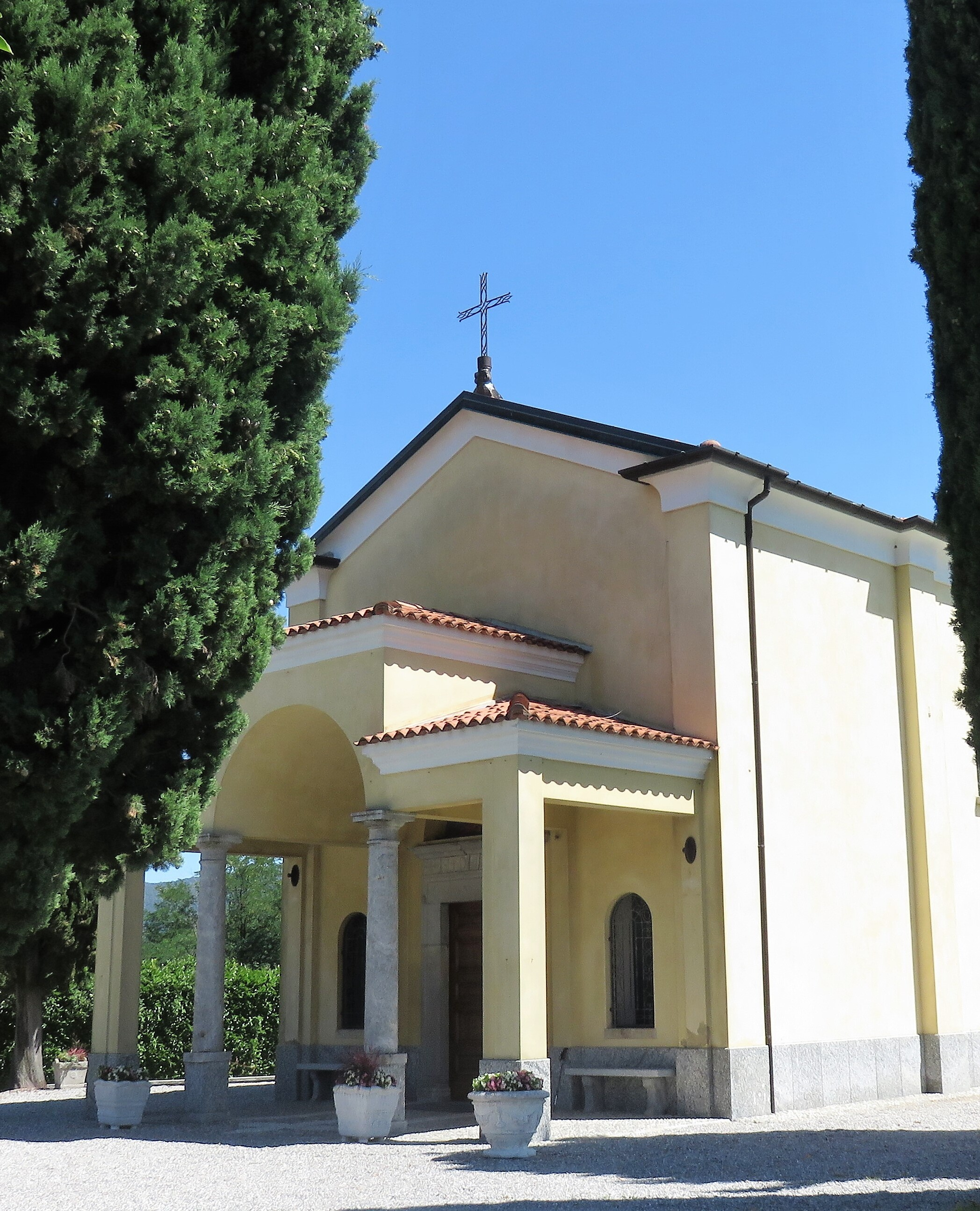
- Church of Santa Maria Assunta

- Coat of arms

- Location within Italy Location within Lombardy
- Coordinates: 45°50′07.3″N 8°41′51.04″E
- Country: Italy
- Region: Lombardy
- Province: Varese (VA)

Government
  - Mayor: Giuseppe Iocca

Area
  - Total: 7.58 km^{2} (2.93 sq mi)

Population (30 December 2021)
  - Total: 3,634
  - Density: 479/km^{2} (1,240/sq mi)
- Time zone: UTC+1 (CET)
  - Summer (DST): UTC+2 (CEST)
- Postal code: 21009
- Dialing code: 0332

Bardello con Malgesso e Bregano is a town and comune located in the province of Varese, in the Lombardy region of northern Italy. It was established on 1 January 2023 from the merger of Bardello, Malgesso and Bregano.

== Geography ==
The municipality is located about 10 km (6.2 mi) northwest of Varese between Lake Varese and Lake Maggiore.

== History ==
The municipality was created on 1 January 2023 with the merger of the previously independent municipalities of Bardello, Bregano and Malgesso. The citizens of the three municipalities had previously approved the merger in February 2022 and the regional council of Lombardy in October 2022.
