= Mario Vitti =

Italian philologist (1926–2023)

Mario Vitti

Mario Vitti (18 August 1926 – 14 February 2023) was an Italian-Greek researcher of New Greek philology, born in Constantinople, Ottoman Empire. He was Honorary Professor of New Greek Philology at the University of Tuscia in Viterbo, Italy.

Vitti died in Rome on 14 February 2023, at the age of 96.

== Sources ==
- Maria Mondelou: L’insegnamento del greco, la nostra identità più genuina. A colloquio con il professor Vincenzo Rotolo, in: Foroellenico. Pubblicazione bimestrale a cura dell’Ufficio Stampa dell’Ambasciata di Grecia in Italia, Anno X, n° 4, 2008, 21–23, online (PDF)
- Marinos Pourgouris: Mediterranean Modernisms. The Poetic Metaphysics of Odysseus Elytis (2016)
