= Benito R. de Monfort =

Spanish photographer

Benito Raimundo Monfort Blanch, known in French as Benito R. de Monfort (1800–1871) was a Spanish photographer, publisher and businessman. He is most notable as the co-founder of both the Société héliographique and the casino de Biarritz. He was born in Valencia and died in Biarritz.

He founded and edited the newspaper La Lumière from February 9 to October 29, 1851, the newspaper of the Société Heliographique de Photographie. At the end of 1851, Monfort handed over his newspaper to Alexis Gaudin. From November 17, it was transformed from a weekly newspaper into a biweekly magazine. A few months after the sale of La Lumière, Monfort founded a new and much more ambitious magazine, Le Cosmos, whose first issue appeared on May 1, 1852 and which was a reason for Gaudin to accuse him of disloyalty. When the Société Heliographique disappeared, Benedict Monfort also became a member of the new Société Française de Photographie.

== Sources ==
- http://www.eshph.org/wp-content/uploads/2016/11/CHANZA.pdf
