= The No Nonsense Guide To Science =

2006 non-fiction book by Jerome Ravetz

The No Nonsense Guide to Science
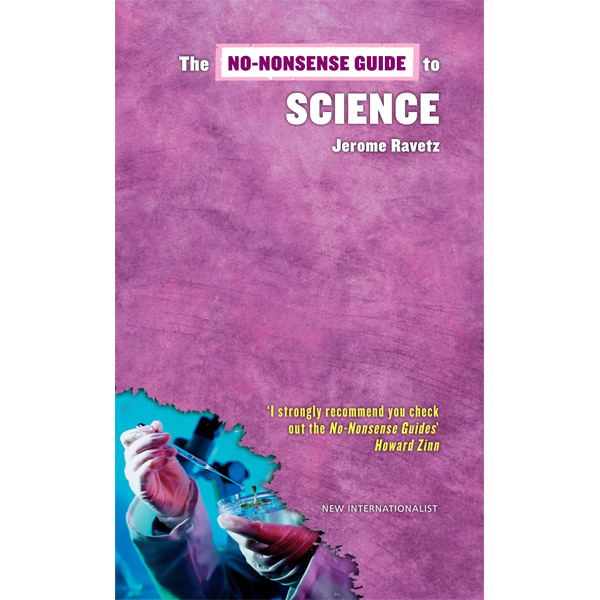
- 2006 edition, reproduced with permission of the publisher
- Author: Jerome Ravetz
- Language: English
- Subjects: Post-normal science
- Publisher: New Internationalist
- Publication date: 2006
- Pages: 142
- ISBN: 1904456464

The No Nonsense Guide to Science is a 2006 book on Post-normal science (PNS). It was written by American born British historian and philosopher of science Jerome Ravetz.

== Main ==
What should a young person do who aspires to make the world a better place and to make their way in science?

This is how this work's ambition was summarized. Written in 2006 by one of the founding fathers of Post-normal Science - the other being Silvio Funtowicz - its 142 pages cover several themes, in part synthesizing previous works such as Scientific Knowledge and Its Social Problems, The Merger of Knowledge with Power, and Uncertainty and Quality in Science for Policy (with Funtowicz), and introduces the ideas of Post-normal Science. Topics include:

- The problem of science being at once 'little' and big or 'mega', embedded in institutions and corporations
- The fallibility of science, against a possibly 'dogmatic' teaching of the power of science
- The democratization of science as a necessary and realistic antidote to its hubris
- The opportunity of forming extended peer communities - inclusive of whistle blowers and investigative journalists as well as academics and interested stakeholders, when science is called to answer conflicted policy questions.
- The relationship between science and society

The book makes themes that are well known to philosophers and sociologists of science accessible to a larger, less specialized audience, including young scientists. The foreword was written by biochemist Tom Blundell, who approves of Ravetz' "direct and provocative" approach to describing science, inclusive of its self-destructive tendencies as well as of its hopes and promises.

== Reception ==
No Nonsense Guide to Science was translated and published in Japan in 2012. Ravetz's work has found use for teaching philosophy and ethics of science, e.g at the University of Copenhagen. The volume may help to develop the competencies that scientists need to perform ethically in postnormal research, by developing the ability to identify issues that fit postnormal settings where "facts are uncertain, values in dispute, stakes high and decision urgent".
