= Science on the Verge =

2016 book

The Rightful Place of Science: Science on the Verge
- Author: Alice Benessia, Silvio Funtowicz, Mario Giampietro, Angela Guimaraes Pereira, Jerome Ravetz, Andrea Saltelli, Roger Strand, Jeroen P. van der Sluijs, Daniel Sarewitz (Foreword)
- Language: English
- Genre: Science
- Publisher: Consortium for Science, Policy, & Outcomes (CSPO)
- Publication date: 20 Feb. 2016
- Publication place: United States
- Media type: print
- Pages: 232
- ISBN: 978-0692596388
- Website: Page of the book at CSPO; See at Amazon; More material

Science on the verge is a book written in 2016 by group of eight scholars working in the tradition of Post-normal science. The book analyzes the main features and possible causes of the present science's crisis.

== Content ==
Science on the verge, written by Alice Benessia, Silvio Funtowicz, Mario Giampietro, Ângela Guimarães Pereira, Jerome Ravetz, Andrea Saltelli, Roger Strand, and Jeroen P. van der Sluijs, with a preface by Dan Sarewitz, follows different threads of the present science's crisis (lost reproducibility, collapsing peer review, perverse metrics, evidence based policy's dysfunctions, techno-science and its hubris, science as metaphysics ...) and presents a first systematic analysis of the main causes of the present predicaments.

- Chapter 1. The chapter entitled 'Who will solve the crisis in science?' tackles the following questions:
  - Is there a crisis?
  - What is being done 'from within'? Is this sufficient?
  - What are the diagnoses for the crisis' root causes, and
  - what are the solutions 'from without'?
- Chapter 2. This is chapter entitled 'The fallacy of evidence based policy' tackles:
  - Quantification as hypocognition;
  - Socially constructed ignorance & uncomfortable knowledge;
  - Ancien régime syndrome;
  - Quantitative story telling.
- Chapter 3. This is chapter entitled 'Never late, never lost, never unprepared' treats:
  - Trajectories of innovation and modes of demarcation of science from society:
    - 'separation',
    - 'hybridization' and
    - 'substitution';
  - What contradictions these trajectories generate.
- Chapter 4. This chapter entitled 'Institutions on the verge' discusses:
  - Working at the science policy interface;
  - The special case of the European Commission's in house science service;
  - The Joint Research Centre as a boundary institutions;
  - Diagnosis, challenges and perspectives.
- Chapter 5. This chapter entitled 'Numbers running wild' deals with:
  - Uses and abuses of quantification;
  - The loss of 'craft skills' with numbers;
  - The case of '7.9% of all species shall become extinct'.
- Chapter 6. This chapter entitled 'Doubt has been eliminated' tells about:
  - Gro Harlem Brundtland's famous 2007 speech, after the Fourth IPCC report and the Stern review;
  - When science becomes a 'life philosophy';
  - Science as the metaphysics of modernity;
  - The inquiry of the Norwegian Research Ethics Committee for Science and Technology.

== Reviews ==
From Joseph A. Tainter, Professor of Sustainability, Utah State University, "Scientists working in the policy arena are often naïve about the impact of their findings. Producing rational results, scientists expect their research to be rationally accepted. The fundamental problem is that humans are not rational. We are emotional thinkers. Science on the Verge exposes many of the fallacies in science applied to societal problems. No matter how good the science, public issues are always ideological and political."

From Judith Curry, climatologist and former chair of the School of Earth and Atmospheric Sciences at the Georgia Institute of Technology, writing on her blog: "This book is a very rich resource for grappling with the problems with science in the 21st century – the articles themselves, as well as the extensive references. I expect to be using this book as a resource for a number of future blog posts. This book deserves a wide audience, and I hope this blog post will help increase its reach."

A post on the book can be found at the blog of the International Social Science Council in Paris. See also this article in The Guardian.
