= Quantitative storytelling =

Quantitative storytelling (QST) is a systematic approach to exploring the many frames potentially legitimate in a scientific study or controversy. QST assumes that, in an interconnected society, multiple frameworks and worldviews are legitimately upheld by different entities and social actors. QST looks critically at models used in evidence-based policy. Such models are often reductionist in that tractability (i.e. the possibility of proceeding toward a solution to a given problem) is achieved at the expense of suppressing available evidence. QST suggests corrective approaches to this practice.

== Description ==
Quantitative storytelling (QST) addresses evidence-based policy and can be considered a reaction to methods of quantification with cost-benefit analysis or risk analysis.

Jerome Ravetz and Steve Rayner discuss the concept that some of the evidence needed for policy is removed from view. They suggest that 'uncomfortable knowledge' is subtracted from the policy discourse with the objective of easing tractability or to advance a given agenda. The word 'hypo-cognition' has been used in the context of these instrumental uses of frames.

According to Rayner, a phenomenon of "displacement" takes place when a model becomes the objective instead of the tool, for example, when an institution chooses to monitor and manage the outcome of a model rather than what happens in reality. Once exposed, the strategic use of hypocognition erodes the trust in the involved actors and institutions.

== Approach ==
QST suggests acknowledging ignorance, as to work out 'clumsy solutions', which may permit negotiation to be had among parties with different normative orientations. QST is also sensitive to power and knowledge asymmetries, as interest groups have more scope to capture regulators than the average citizen and consumer.

QST does not forbid the use of quantitative tools altogether. It suggests instead to quantitatively explore multiple narratives, avoiding spurious accuracy and focusing on some salient features of the selected stories. Rather than attempting to amass evidence in support of a given reading or policy, or to optimise it with modelling, QST tries to test whether a given policy option or framing conflicts with existing social or biophysical constraints. These are:

- Feasibility (is the policy permissible given the existing resources?);
- Viability (is it compatible with existing social arrangements or rules?);
- Desirability (will society subscribe to it?).

== Applications ==
A recent application of QST exploring the transition to intermittent electrical energy supply has been made in Germany and Spain. They use QST to explore a case of water and agricultural governance in the Canary Islands.

Applications are to composite indicators, use of biofuels, innovation, bioplastic, gender perspectives in urban household energy transition, and in the context of Post-normal science.
