= Centre for History and Philosophy of Science, University of Leeds =

UK research centre

Coordinates: 53.807°N 1.553°W

The Centre for History and Philosophy of Science is a research centre devoted to the historical and philosophical study of science, technology and medicine, based in the School of Philosophy, Religion and History of Science, at the University of Leeds in West Yorkshire, England. The Centre – previously known as the Division of History and Philosophy of Science, which was founded in 1956 – is one of the oldest units of its kind in the world. Throughout its history, the Centre has been home to many of the leading historians and philosophers of science who have deepened our understanding of scientific activity and how it shapes and is shaped by wider society.

== History ==
The key figure in establishing history and philosophy of science (HPS) as a discipline at Leeds was the philosopher of science Stephen Toulmin, who was appointed Professor of Philosophy at Leeds in 1954 and head of department in 1956. Whilst Thomas Kuhn is often seen as the founder of the modern field of history and philosophy of science, Toulmin had argued for an integration of philosophy of science and history of science some nine years before Kuhn published his famous work, The Structure of Scientific Revolutions. The distinguished philosophy of science, Mary Hesse, who was based at Leeds from 1951-55 as a lecturer in mathematics, was also instrumental in establishing what became the Division of History and Philosophy of Science. One of the earliest PhD students in the division was the historian and author June Goodfield, who graduated in 1959 before a varied career spanning appointments at Wellesley College, Michigan State University, and George Washington University.

The 1970s saw a period of further expansion of the Division, with the appointments of John Christie, Jonathan Hodge (recipient in 2019 of the distinguished Hull Prize awarded by the ISHPSSB), and Geoffrey Cantor following the arrival of Robert Olby. Olby in particular became a leading figure in the Division, not least through his ground-breaking book, Path to the Double Helix, which showed how the 1953 discoveries of Crick and Watson were rooted in the work of two University of Leeds scientists: the creator of molecular biology, William Astbury, and the Nobel prizewinning inventor of X-ray crystallography, William Henry Bragg. Cantor, Christie, Hodge, and Olby formed the core of the Division for the following decade, culminating in the joint publication of the major reference text, Companion to the History of Modern Science (1989), known locally simply as the Leeds Companion. This cemented the reputation of the Division, which made regular further appointments over the following years, before becoming incorporated as a Centre within the School of Philosophy, Religion and History of Science in 2013.

Since its inception the Centre, now a core part of the broader School of Philosophy, Religion and History of Science, has fostered the development of significant figures in history and philosophy of science, including Jerry Ravetz, who wrote in Leeds one of the foundational works of Post-normal science. Major research projects, especially Science in the Nineteenth Century Periodical, Owning and Disowning Invention, the Leeds Genetics Pedagogies Project, and Scientific Realism and the Quantum, have been based in the Centre, with significant collaboration across other research institutions within and beyond the UK.

== Degree Programmes ==
The Centre has a long history of innovation in teaching the history and philosophy of science, particularly in conjunction with other subject areas in both the sciences and the arts and humanities. At undergraduate level the suite# includes Joint Honours degree programmes in history and philosophy of science with history, biology, physics, or philosophy, and a unique programme in Philosophy, Psychology and Scientific Thought. At Masters level the MA History of Science, Technology and Medicine is the Centre's flagship programme, and prepares students for a wide range of careers as well as further historical research. The Centre maintains a sizeable cohort of doctoral researchers, and has since 2007 received the largest number of AHRC Collaborative Doctoral Awards of any academic unit in the UK.

== Activities ==
The Centre runs two major seminar series during the academic year, each of which cuts across the broad field of history and philosophy of science. The fortnightly HPS Seminar Series features a diverse range of field-leading speakers from within the UK and internationally. Meanwhile the weekly HPS Work-in-progress Seminar Series serves as a testing ground for postgraduate researchers and academic members of the Centre, who showcase their research at various stages of development, from inception of ideas to preparing for publication. Other focal points include regular reading groups, particularly in history and philosophy of biology and the history of technology, and stand-alone conferences.

Research in the Centre has been supported by a range of funding bodies, including the AHRC, UK Research and Innovation, Wellcome Trust, National Science Foundation, British Academy, and Leverhulme Trust. The Centre has been involved in significant partnership work with science and heritage organisations, including the Leeds-based Thackray Museum of Medicine, Science Museum Group, Leeds Museums & Galleries, Action on Hearing Loss, BT Archives, Women's Engineering Society, British Library, and National Institute of Agricultural Botany.

== Museum and "HPS in 20" ==
The Museum of the History of Science, Technology and Medicine is a major focal point of research, teaching, and engagement activities. The Museum was formed in 2007 by staff and students in the Centre, and works to preserve and promote the use of scientific artefacts in teaching, research and public engagement. Led by its director, the Museum maintains and catalogues objects in storage, develops exhibitions and digital materials, runs public events and school visits, and plays a key role in teaching activities for both undergraduate and postgraduate students. With over 20,000 objects and specimens in storage or on display in various locations across campus, the collections are broad-ranging and reflect the historic scientific strengths of the University of Leeds in textiles and colour chemistry, as well as in science education. Particular highlights from within the collection include the Newlyn-Phillips Machine (the only extant prototype of MONIAC, the hugely influential early computation device), an example of the very early 'Laennec' stethoscope (), Irene Manton's microscope, and William Astbury's camera.

Across 2016 and 2017 the collections formed the basis of a major series of twenty lectures charting the History and Philosophy of Science in 20 Objects. The lectures featured academic members of staff, postdoctoral and visiting researchers, and postgraduate researchers and provided a synoptic overview of the history and philosophy of science. It has since been reimagined as an online resource for pre-university students with interests in both history and science, technology, and medicine.

== Further information ==
- Graeme Gooday, 'History and Philosophy of Science at Leeds', Notes and Records of the Royal Society 60 (2006), 183–192.
