= Gooday =

Gooday is a surname. Notable people with the surname include:

- Graeme John Norman Gooday (born 1965), British historian and philosopher of science
- Graham Gooday (1942–2001), British molecular biologist
- Leslie Gooday (1921–2013), British architect
- Sydney Gooday (1887–1964), British and Canadian swimmer
