= Extended peer community =

Community debating science used for policy

The concept of Extended peer community belongs to the field of Sociology of science, and in particular the use of science in the solution of social, political or ecological problems. It was first introduced by in the 1990s by Silvio Funtowicz and Jerome R. Ravetz. in the context of what would become Post-normal science. An Extended peer community is intended by these authors as a space where both credentialed experts from different disciplines and lay stakeholders can discuss and deliberate.

== Content ==
An Extended peer community is intended by its creators as an arrangement at the science policy interface that helps to expand and assess both the knowledge-base and the value-base of policy-making'.

Post-normal science's extended peer community argues for two kind of extensions: first, more than one discipline is assumed to have a potential bearing on the issue being debated, thereby providing different lenses to consider the problem. Second the community is extended to lay actors, taken to be all those with stakes, or an interest, in the given issue.

The lay members of the community thus constituted may also take upon themselves active 'research' tasks; this has happened e.g. in the so-called 'popular epidemiology', when the official authorities have shown reluctance to perform investigations deemed necessary by the communities affected - for example - by a case of air or water pollution, and more recently ‘citizen science’. The extended community can usefully investigate the quality of the scientific assessments provided by the experts, the definition of the problem, as well as research priorities and research questions.

An example of extended peer community in action is offered by Brian Wynne, who discusses the Cumbrian sheep farmers' interaction with scientists and authorities, mobilizing farmers' knowledge of the relevant situation (acid upland moors retaining radioactive deposition from fallout longer than the lowland Oxfordshire meadows on which the official parameters were based).

Extended peer communities and Post-normal Science have been suggested to tackle the debate on the policy and regulation of Large Language Models in order to encourage "inclusion of previously marginalised perspectives".

The concept of extended peer community was developed in the context of politicised quality controversies in science (such as 'housewife' or 'popular' epidemiology), early evidence-based medicine (the Cochrane collaboration), and the total quality management ideas of W. Edwards Deming, in particular quality circles. EPC is discussed in a special issue of the journal Science, Technology, & Human Values. For Eugene A. Rosa EPC can help charting "extended facts", meant as local knowledge, understanding, and non academic sources.

== See also ==
- Post-normal science
- Sociology of scientific knowledge
- Technology and society
- Science studies
- Social construction of technology
