= PNT =

PNT may refer to:

- National Peasants' Party, a Romanian political party
- National Executive Committee for Space-Based Positioning, Navigation and Timing
- National Workers' Party (Spain), a small far-right party in Spain
- Pontiac Transportation Center, Michigan, Amtrak station code
- Postnormal times, in post-normal science
- Prime number theorem
- Pacific Northwest Trail, a hiking trail
- Palestinian National Theatre
- p-Nitrotoluene
- Pontic Greek's ISO 639-3 code
- Positioning, navigation, and timing
