= Synergetic theory =

Pseudoscientific theory

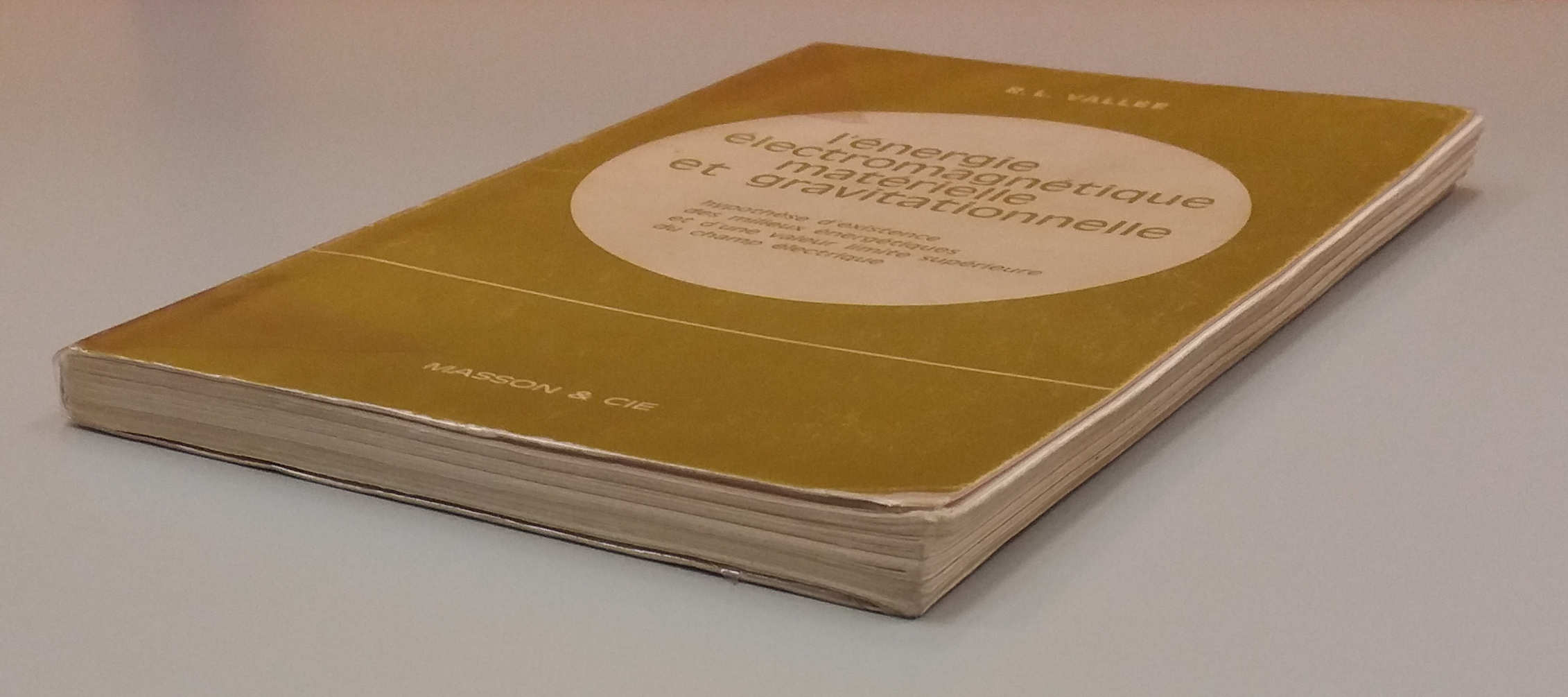
L'énergie électromagnétique matérielle et gravitationnelle by René-Louis Vallée.

Synergetic theory, also known as "synergy" and referred to by some as a pseudoscientific theory, was developed by René-Louis Vallée and first disseminated in 1971 with the publication of his book L'énergie électromagnétique matérielle et gravitationnelle (Material and Gravitational Electromagnetic Energy).

The magazine Science et Vie published several articles on the subject, and in 1975, it reported on an experiment that allegedly generated more energy than was input into the system. This sparked a long-standing controversy over the discovery of "free energy." The following year, La Recherche examined Vallée's book and, under his guidance, commissioned physicists to conduct a rigorous test to verify or refute the initial claims. The results were negative: no excess energy was observed.

A critical examination of the theory in question reveals a multitude of inconsistencies. It becomes evident that the author's work is based on his personal beliefs, formulating a set of disconnected equations. Vallée opposed modern physics, viewing the theoretical advancements of the 20th century as overly intricate and incompatible with reality.

Vallée was affiliated with the Alexandre Dufour Physics Circle and supported by free-energy enthusiasts until the early 2000s, which enabled him to achieve a certain degree of media presence before synergetics faded from public discourse.

== History ==
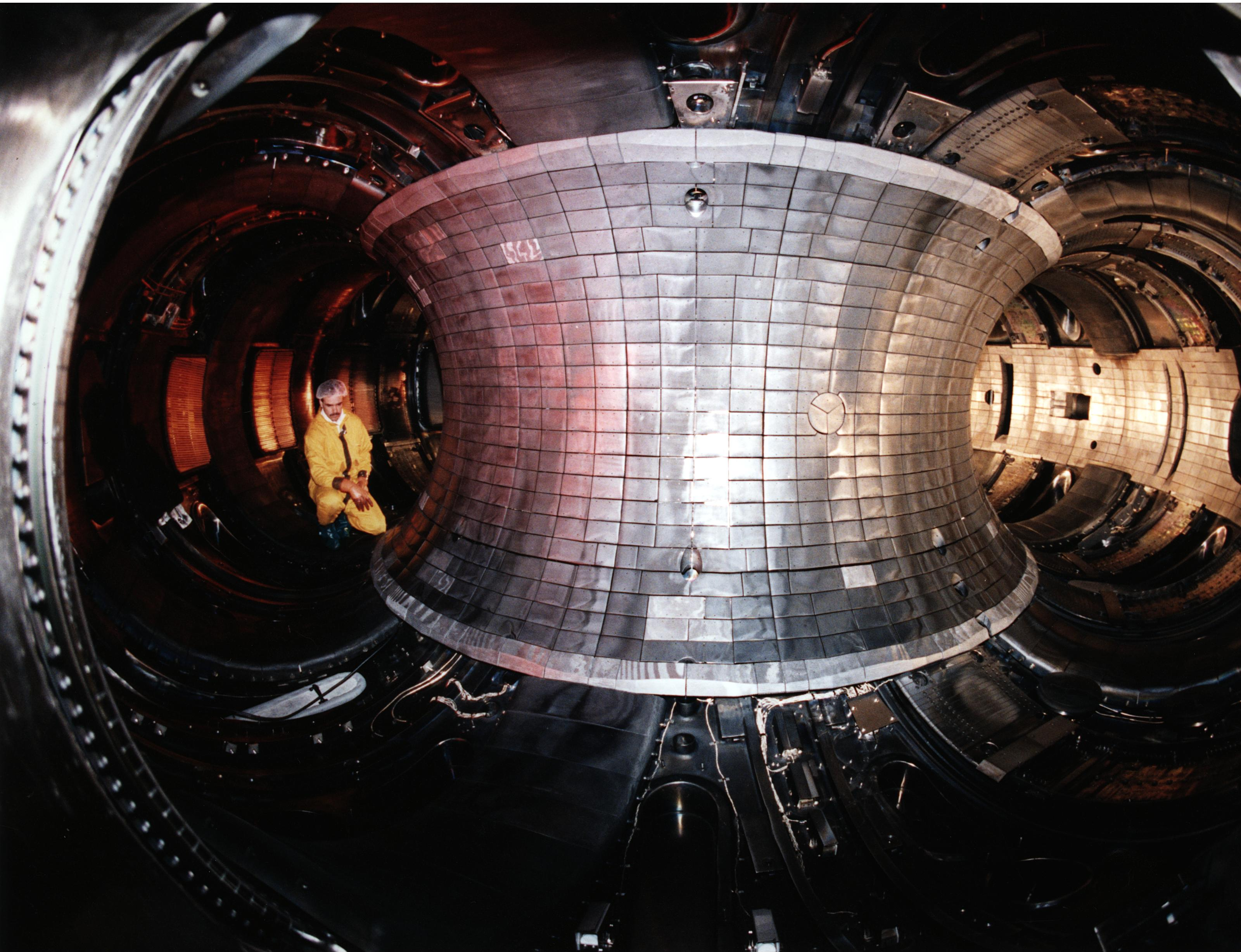
Inside a tokamak

René-Louis Vallée (1926–2007), a 1951 graduate of Supélec, was employed by Alsthom from 1953 to 1958 and subsequently by the French Atomic Energy Commission (CEA) until 1976. Between 1970 and 1974, he authored several books about his professional expertise.

Vallée, a student of Louis de Broglie during his studies, developed a lifelong interest in physics and an alternative theory aimed at unifying the four fundamental forces. This culminated in the publication of his book, L'énergie électromagnétique matérielle et gravitationnelle, in 1971.

As a member of the Alexandre Dufour Physics Circle, Vallée promoted his book and theory during a 1972 lecture. The main objective of the circle was to challenge the tenets of modern physics. Despite presenting his critiques of physics objectively in his written works, Vallée expressed clear anti-relativist sentiments in his speeches, rejecting what he described as a "blind worship of revealed relativity."

In the context of the initial oil crisis, Vallée advanced his theory as a radical departure from conventional wisdom, asserting that global capitalism had hastily embraced relativity with the fervor of a religious doctrine. He leveled accusations against several physicists, characterizing their views as those of members of a "discreet philosophical-scientific sect." In a letter to La Recherche, he referred to Richard Feynman as a "man in black."

Following his dismissal from the CEA in 1976, Vallée engaged in a public debate with Industry Minister André Giraud on the radio program Le téléphone sonne in 1979. He challenged the prevailing preference for nuclear power, advocating instead for his concept of "free energy."

In February 1974, Science et Vie commenced coverage of synergistic theory, subsequently revisiting the topic in January 1975. During this latter period, Vallée employed his theory to elucidate the failure of nuclear fusion experiments in tokamaks, asserting that conventional scientific paradigms lacked rational explanations.

In 1976, forming a support committee for Vallée resulted in the establishment of the SEPED (Society for the Study and Promotion of Diffuse Energy), which was operational between 1976 and 1984.

In the context of the 1978 French nuclear debate, anti-nuclear activist René Barjavel expressed support for Vallée's Lettre ouverte aux vivants et à ceux qui veulent le rester (An open letter to the living and those who wish to remain living), citing the latter's theory as a disruption to the habits of thought and work that had been based on relativity for approximately half a century. Barjavel further noted that Einstein and his contemporaries had asserted that space vehicles could never exceed the speed of light, a claim that he regarded as untenable.

Vallée expressed dismay at the apparent lack of interest in synergistic, suggesting that there were conspiracies at play, involving official science, global capitalism, and even the World Zionist Organization, which were preventing scientific progress. In a letter to Prime Minister Jacques Chirac dated May 21, 1986, he reiterated these accusations. (Note: Extract from Vallée's letter: the “dangerous ignorance of those responsible for official science, most of whom have been put in place by occult politico-religious powers, including, in a prominent position, the World Zionist Organization.”)

Vallée was unable to disseminate his theory through conventional channels; therefore, he turned to the Internet as a means of sharing his ideas.

By the year 2000, he had become a member of the New York Academy of Sciences and had written the preface for a scientific document in which he discussed his theory, which was subsequently renamed GUST (Grand Unified Synergetic Theory).

While Vallée's work receded from public consciousness, the concept of free energy endured. In 2003, the Swiss-based GIFNET (Global Institute for New Energy Technologies) was established, with its French director Jean-Luc Naudin espousing the tenets of the synergistic theory. The institute has since ceased to maintain an online presence.

== Definitions ==
In 1973, Vallée submitted the terms "synergy" and "synergetic theory" to the French Academy's Committee for Technical Terms. In his 1971 book, he introduced the concept of "synergetic potential", which he defined as follows:

$V = c^2$: The square of the propagation speed of electromagnetic waves in a vacuum filled with matter.

Science et Vie widely adopted the terms " synergistic" and "synergetic theory", which described the "synergetic generator" or "battery" as a device purportedly capable of harnessing the diffuse energy present in the universe.

Vallée discussed the potential for harnessing "diffuse electromagnetic energy that traverses the immensity of the Universe", which could be realized with a more profound comprehension of the characteristics of matter, particularly within "diffuse energetic environments."

This central notion of synergetic theory inspired the designation of the SEPED (Society for the Study and Promotion of Diffuse Energy), which was operational for less than a decade.

== Synergy ==
Photon isolated according to the law of materialization.

René-Louis Vallée offered a critique of the complexity of special relativity but drew extensively upon its conceptual framework. He put forth a concept of "synergy", or total energy, which he expressed through the formula S=mc^{2}. This formula is identical to Albert Einstein's, but it incorporates not only the system's energy but also the diffuse energy of the medium surrounding it. However, his other theoretical propositions diverged from the prevailing consensus. For Vallée, space was Euclidean, time was universal, and the speed of light was not constant. He also proposed that gravitation is a force of electromagnetic origin, which contrasts with Einstein's advancements in the field, which deepened understanding but lacked definitive explanations.

=== Laws ===
Synergetics puts forth two hypotheses regarding the conversion between energy and matter. The first is the "law of materialization", which posits that energy can be transformed into matter. The second is the "upper limit value of the electric field", which suggests that matter can be transformed into energy when a field reaches a value of 39 × 10^{15} V/m. These laws are, in fact, hypotheses. Vallée characterizes the law of materialization as "a fundamental law of nature that was missing from the known laws of physics."

He claimed to have discovered an "inexhaustible source of cosmic energy" available everywhere, asserting that matter is a localized form of this diffuse energy, explained through his upper limit field hypothesis.

=== Diffuse energy ===
Vallée put forth the theory that the universe is permeated by a vast, hitherto undiscovered form of "diffuse energy", which can account for all observable physical phenomena. According to this hypothesis, elementary particles represent distinct manifestations of this energy.

In Chapter 9 of his book, Vallée posited that "gravitation and cosmic radiation have a common origin in diffuse electromagnetic energy." He put forth the hypothesis that the speed of light is variable and dependent on the diffuse medium through which it propagates, deriving a formula for the "energy equivalence of gravitational fields:"

$$\frac {\delta W}{\delta t} = \rho_0 - \frac {1}{8\pi{k}} (\gamma)^2$$

A simple calculation shows that a cubic metre of empty space on the Earth's surface contains 57,000 Megajoules less energy than a cubic metre of interstellar space.

This formula is, apart from one factor, the same as that for gravitational potential energy. The added constant, $\rho_0$, is the energy density of the matter-free diffuse medium, but the theory doesn't know how to calculate it, and Vallée merely gives orders of magnitude.

=== Experiments ===
In 1975, Belgian scientist Eric d'Hoker conducted the inaugural experiment based on synergetic theory in Mortsel. The results indicated that the generated energy was four times the input. The experiment entailed charging a capacitor with a battery and then discharging the current through a graphite rod. Vallée ascribed the surplus energy to a reaction in which a carbon-12 atom transformed a radioactive boron-12 atom, which subsequently reverted to carbon via beta decay, thereby releasing additional energy.

A second experiment was conducted on January 23, 1976, at the Physics Faculty of Paris 7, by Francis Kovacs, to validate the aforementioned findings. The experiment was designed to confirm the energy surplus and convert it into usable electric current, using parameters provided by Vallée. A capacitor was used to discharge a current through a glass tube filled with powdered graphite, surrounded by a coil that recovered a secondary current, which was then visualized on an oscilloscope. Tests were conducted in three configurations: no magnetic field, a field aligned with the electric current, and a field opposed to it. In all cases, the results matched the predictions made by the Lenz-Faraday law, showing no "synergetic" effects.

== Criticism ==
Vallée posited that synergetic theory could be used to harness limitless energy from any point in space using a simple, inexpensive device. In November 1975, Science et Vie published an article endorsing Vallée's theory based on a single experiment and critiqued the lack of interest from physicists.

In the wake of the 1976 verification, which yielded negative results, Michel de Pracontal drew parallels between synergetics and a contemporary iteration of perpetual motion, noting that both promised the generation of free energy from seemingly unlimited sources.

The individual who conducted the counter-experiment, Jean-Marc Lévy-Leblond, was highly critical of Vallée, who postulated a conspiracy against his theory. Lévy-Leblond argued that the principles of synergetics were not susceptible to refutation, as they were not formalized and predictive, and therefore not scientific. He described Vallée's theoretical framework as incomprehensible, likening it to the peculiar calligraphy of Saul Steinberg, composed of recognizable symbols but lacking an intelligible whole.

Vallée's apparent objective was to develop a comprehensive theoretical framework, which he referred to as a "theory of everything." He sought to portray synergetics as a "quantum and gravitational energy theory" that would restore objectivity to science by making it "accessible to the general public."

Nevertheless, this assertion of accessibility proved to be illusory upon examination of the text in question. Furthermore, Vallée himself never subjected his theories to empirical testing, thereby rendering them inherently unverifiable.

== Legacy ==
Synergetic theory, which was promoted by free-energy advocates from the 1970s to the early 2000s, enjoyed a brief period of popularity between its coverage in Science et Vie and its definitive refutation in La Recherche. It has since become an example of "alter-science", according to Alexandre Moatti, and a scientific imposture, per Michel de Pracontal.

Moatti drew a parallel between Vallée and Maurice Allais, who developed an interest in physics at a relatively advanced age and published his inaugural theory on the subject at the age of 86. Allais is renowned for challenging the prevailing theories of Newton and Einstein. He shares similarities with Vallée in this regard. Nevertheless, the term "synergetics" is more frequently linked with Nikola Tesla and his notion of free energy. In the early 20th century, renowned engineer Nikola Tesla sought to transmit electricity wirelessly and harness cosmic radiation energy. Despite the discovery of X-rays in 1895, Tesla rejected the concept of energy contained within matter. In 1931, he claimed to have constructed a "cosmic energy receiver" and used it to power a vehicle. Like Vallée, Tesla rejected overly theoretical science, dismissed the theory of relativity as false, and announced a "unified theory of gravitation" that explained this force simply and denied Einstein's concept of curved space.

== René-Louis Vallée bibliography ==
Reference Work

- Vallée, René-Louis (1971). L'énergie électromagnétique matérielle et gravitationnelle : Hypothèse d'existence des milieux énergétiques et d'une valeur limite supérieure du champ électrique [Material and gravitational electromagnetic energy: Hypothesis of the existence of energetic media and an upper limit value for the electric field] (in French). Paris: Masson et Cie.

Presentations and writings

- Vallée, René-Louis (2005). "Les bases de la mécanique synergétique" [The basics of synergetic mechanics]. webalors.org (in French). Archived from the original (PDF) on November 22, 2024.
- Vallée, René-Louis. "Étude du mouvement des particules chargées en milieu diélectrique non homogène »" [Study of the motion of charged particles in inhomogeneous dielectric media]. webalors.org (in French). Archived from the original on November 22, 2024.
- Vallée, René-Louis. Notes sur la nature diélectrique des champs de gravitation [Notes on the dielectric nature of gravitational fields] (in French).
- Vallée, René-Louis. La Synergie des noyaux et la radioactivité [Nucleus synergy and radioactivity] (in French).
- Vallée, René-Louis. La théorie synergétique : Exposé d'ensemble fait par René-Louis Vallée à la mutualité le 4 février 1976 [Synergetic theory: Comprehensive presentation by René-Louis Vallée at the Mutualité on February 4, 1976] (in French).
- Vallée, René-Louis. "La théorie synergétique modèle cosmologique" [Synergetic theory cosmological model]. webalors.org (in French). Archived from the original (PDF) on November 22, 2024.
- Vallée, René-Louis. "Le vide producteur d'énergie - Captation de l'énergie diffuse de l'espace" [The energy-producing vacuum - Capturing the diffuse energy of space]. jlnlabs.online.fr (in French). Archived from the original on July 21, 2024.
- Vallée, René-Louis. "PROTELF - (PROTon-ELectron-Fusion)". jlnlabs.online.fr (in French). Archived from the original on March 25, 2023.

== Bibliography ==
- Lévy-Leblond, Jean-Marc (1976). "La « théorie synergétique » de monsieur Vallée" [Mr. Vallée's “Synergetic Theory"]. La Recherche (in French). 7 (69): 661–662.
- Lisan, Benjamin (1978). "La Théorie Synergétique, une étude critique". Archived from the original on May 1, 2016.
- Moatti, Alexandre (2013). Alterscience : Postures, dogmes, idéologies [Alterscience: Postures, dogmas, ideologies]. Sciences (in French). Paris: Odile Jacob. pp. 85–97. ISBN 978-2-7381-2887-4.
- de Pracontal, Michel (2005). L'imposture scientifique en dix leçons [The scientific imposture in ten lessons]. Points - Sciences (in French) (3rd ed.). Seuil. pp. 92–94. ISBN 978-2-02-063944-6.
- de La Taille, Renaud (1975). "Qui osera réfuter la synergétique ? : Alors que le premier générateur synergétique vient de fonctionner, la science officielle continue à ignorer les travaux du Pr. Vallée. Ceci est d'autant plus grave que les travaux mènent à l'indépendance énergétique. Aussi demandons-nous aux chercheurs de se prononcer sans équivoque sur la valeur de la théorie synergétique" [Who will dare to refute Synergetics? While the first Synergetic generator has just been put into operation, official science continues to ignore Prof. Vallée's work. This is all the more serious as the work is leading to energy independence. We therefore ask researchers to state unequivocally their position on the value of synergy theory] (PDF). Science & Vie (in French) (698). Archived from the original (PDF) on July 13, 2024.
- de La Taille, Renaud (1976). "Un jeune français construit une pile inépuisable" [A young Frenchman builds an inexhaustible battery]. Science & Vie (in French) (700).

Articles from the circle of friends of Vallée or SEPED

- Friang, Claude Y. (1979). "Énergie : Einstein, Maxwell et la synergétique" [Energy: Einstein, Maxwell and Synergetics]. Impact science et société (in French). 29 (4). UNESCO: 415–417. Archived from the original on December 2, 2022.
