= Graeme John Norman Gooday =

British historian and philosopher (born 1965)

Graeme John Norman Gooday (born June 1965) is a British historian and philosopher of science currently working as Professor of History of Science and Technology at the University of Leeds School of Philosophy, Religion, and History of Science, where he was Head of School between 2014 and 2019. His research encompasses the history and philosophy of technology: especially electrical technologies, telecommunications, and auditory technologies. He has published extensively on measurement, gender and technology, women in engineering, and histories of patenting.

== Education ==
Gooday's PhD dissertation was on 'Precision Measurement and the Genesis of Physics Teaching Laboratories in Victorian Britain' and he (jointly) won the 1988-9 British Society for the History of Science Singer Prize for his essay on this topic. His first book The Morals of Measurement: accuracy, irony and trust in late Victorian electrical practice extended his key work on measurement and was published by Cambridge University Press in 2004.

== Career and awards ==
Gooday returned to the University of Kent in 1989 to complete an IEEE fellowship in Electrical History and then a British Academy Postdoctoral Fellowship. Then in 1992 he moved to the University of Oxford to take up a Postdoctoral Fellowship in the History of Science and Technology before becoming a Lecturer in History History and Philosophy of Science at the University of Leeds. He was President of the British Science Association in 2011 and has held various positions in the British Society for the History of Science, including Treasurer and, more recently, Finance Committee member. In 2014 he won the British Society for the History of Science Pickstone prize for his co-authored (with Stathis Aropostathis) book Patently Contestable: Electrical Technologies and Inventor Identities on Trial in Britain The awarding panel described the book as a 'superbly scholarly volume [which] offers a richly wrought set of case studies of electrical technologies including telephony, incandescent lighting, electrical power and wireless communication in the late 19th and the early 20th centuries'. He has led a number of research projects sponsored by the Arts and Humanities Research Council, including projects on: telecommunications and intellectual property in the First World War, telecommunications and hearing loss, and electrification of country houses

His research on hearing loss and domesticating electricity has (respectively) been used to inform museum exhibitions based in the Leeds Thackray Medical Museum and the Minneapolis Bakken Museum. The royalties from his recent book on the history of hearing loss (authored with Professor Karen Sayer) will be split between the charity ' Action on Hearing Loss' and the National Deaf Children's Society. He has made a number of media appearances and publications. and published on teaching history of science.

== Notable works ==
- Managing the Experience of Hearing Loss, in Britain, 1830-1930
- Patently Contestable: Electrical Technologies and Inventor Identities on Trial in Britain
- Domesticating Electricity: Technology, Uncertainty and Gender, 1880-1914
- The Morals of Measurement: accuracy, irony and trust in late Victorian electrical practice
- By Whose Standards? Standardization, Stability and Uniformity in the History of Information and Electrical Technologies.
- Physics in Oxford 1839-1939: laboratories, learning and college life
- Science in the Nineteenth-Century Periodical: Reading the Magazine of Nature - Cambridge Studies in Nineteenth-Century Literature and Culture
- A Pioneer of Connection: Recovering the Life and Work of Oliver Lodge - Science and Culture in the Nineteenth Century
