= Postnormal times =

Post-normal times (PNT)

Postnormal times (PNT) is a concept developed by Ziauddin Sardar as a development of post-normal science. Sardar describes the present as "postnormal times", "in an in-between period where old orthodoxies are dying, new ones have yet to be born, and very few things seem to make sense."

== Context ==
In support of engaging communities of various scope and scale on how to best navigate PNT and imagine preferred pathways toward the future(s), Sardar and Sweeney published an article in the journal Futures outlining The Three Tomorrows method, which fills a gap in the field as "many methods of futures and foresight seldom incorporate pluralism and diversity intrinsically in their frameworks, and few, if any, emphasize the dynamic and merging nature of futures possibilities, or highlight the ignorance and uncertainties we constantly confront".

== Theory and criticism ==
Rakesh Kapoor criticized PNT in 2011 as a Western concept that does not apply to India and other emerging markets. Sam Cole criticised the three Cs of PNT (chaos, complexity and contradictions) as "Alliterative Logic, theorizing through alliterative word-triads that is not based on empirical evidence". Jay Gary has suggested that PNT is embryonic, needs a more robust framework, and should be extended to include C S Holling's adaptive cycle. Scientists working on complex evolving systems have pointed out that PNT recalls the "Long Waves" of Kondratiev and Joseph Schumpeter's view of waves of "creative destruction".

PNT is one of the core areas of research for the Center for Postnormal Policy and Futures Studies at East-West University in Chicago, Illinois, US. A number of articles and editorials on PNT have been published in the journal East-West Affairs.
