= The Merger of Knowledge with Power =

Book by Jerome Ravetz

The Merger of Knowledge with Power: Essays in Critical Science
- First edition
- Author: Jerome Ravetz
- Language: English
- Subject: Science
- Publisher: Mansell
- Publication date: 1990
- Publication place: United Kingdom
- Media type: Print
- Pages: 352
- ISBN: 0720120217
- Website: Preview on Google Books

The Merger of Knowledge with Power: Essays in Critical Science is a book written in 1990 by Jerome Ravetz.

The book contains a series of essays which touch upon science and policy, the role of ideologies in scientific progress, and broader themes of history and philosophy of Science, with critical attention to points of friction between science and society. "We can best understand this anthology as a 20-year continuation of his seminal study, Scientific Knowledge and Its Social Problems".

In this book Ravetz invites us to consider science and its prodigious achievements on the face of the growing awareness that science is also at the root of many modern problems. In the opening essay "A critical awareness of science" he suggests adopting the perspective of the poor, and considering where science has failed them.

In the essay on "Francis Bacon and the Reform of Philosophy" Ravetz argues that Bacon's audacious reform programme owed much more to his religion views, hopes and expectation than is normally accounted for. The Chapter "Ideological Commitment in the Philosophy of Science' offers Ravetz's first hand reading of the relevance of ideology in the philosophies of science of Karl Popper, Thomas Kuhn, Imre Lakatos and Paul Feyerabend.

The book has detailed discussions of risks and regulation and science's role therein, and a critique of 'reckless' science ("Hardware and Fantasy in Military Technology"). Ravetz also presents his insight on the use of ignorance ("Usable Knowledge, Usable Ignorance: Incomplete Science with Policy Implications"; the book is credited with having provided the first illustration of ‘science-based ignorance’, p. 26), the Gaia hypothesis, how to constructively tackle the problems of quality control of quantitative information, and the need for "A new social contract for science". For Carrozza (2015) this book (p. 284) investigates the two interrelated processes of the scientization of politics and of the politicization of expertise "in the spirit of a general call for renewing the social contract between science and society".

== Reviews ==
Two reviews are available, one on American Scientist and another on New Scientist
