= Uncertainty and Quality in Science for Policy =

1990 book by Silvio Funtowicz and Jerome Ravetz

- Authors: Silvio Funtowicz; Jerome Ravetz
- Language: English
- Subject: Science
- Publisher: Kluwer
- Publication date: 1990
- Publication place: Netherlands
- Media type: Print
- Pages: 231
- ISBN: 978-94-009-0621-1
- Website: Preview on Google Books

Uncertainty and Quality in Science for Policy is a 1990 book by Silvio Funtowicz and Jerome Ravetz, in which the authors explain the notational system NUSAP (numeral, unit, spread, assessment, pedigree) and applies it to several examples from the environmental sciences. The work is considered foundational to the development of post-normal science.

== Content ==
This work, written by the fathers of post-normal science, discusses the use of science for policy and its problems. The book emphasizes the need for craft skills with numbers – not only in statistics but also in cost-benefit analysis, and on the need of specific skills for policy-related research. It introduces for the first time NUSAP, a new notational system for the management of uncertainty and quality in quantitative information, and presents examples of its application to radiological hazards, the valuation of ecosystems, and to energy technologies.

This work is one of the most quoted in the field of science and technology studies - see also Science, technology and society (STS), especially relation to the issue of "democratization of expertise". For Carrozza (2015) and Gooday (2006) this work, together with Ravetz's Scientific Knowledge and Its Social Problems (1971) constitutes the bedrock for the conceptualization of post-normal science in the first half of the 1990s.
