= Hypocognition =

Inability to communicate due to no words for a concept

Hypocognition, in cognitive linguistics, means missing and being unable to communicate cognitive and linguistic representations because there are no words for particular concepts.

== Origins ==
The word hypocognition (and its opposite, hypercognition) was coined by American psychiatrist and anthropologist Robert Levy in his 1973 book Tahitians: Mind and Experience in the Society Islands. After 26 months of studying them, Levy described Tahitians as having no words to describe sorrow or guilt, resulting in people who had suffered personal losses describing themselves as feeling sick or strange instead of sad. Levy believed the Tahitians' lack of frames for thinking about and expressing grief contributed to their high suicide rate. He believed that a balance between hypercognition and hypocognition was culturally most desirable.

== Usage ==
Hypocognition is a phrase commonly used in linguistics. In 2004 George Lakoff used it to describe political progressives in the United States, saying that relative to conservatives they suffer from "massive hypocognition," which he described as the lack of having a progressive philosophy framed around the progressive core values of empathy and responsibility such as "effective government" versus "less government" or "broader prosperity" versus "free markets."

== Effects ==
Hypocognition has been blamed for preventing the practical application of evidence-based medicine in areas where frames (contextual and presentational influences on perceptions of reality) obscure facts. More generally, experts often overuse their own expertise: e.g. cardiologist diagnose a heart problem when the actual problem is something else.

== See also ==
- Rectification of names
