= NUSAP =

NUSAP is a notational system for the management and communication of uncertainty in science for policy, based on five categories for characterizing any quantitative statement: Numeral, Unit, Spread, Assessment and Pedigree. NUSAP was introduced by Silvio Funtowicz and Jerome Ravetz in the 1990 book Uncertainty and Quality in Science for Policy. See also van der Sluijs et al. 2005.

== The concept ==
The name "NUSAP" is an acronym for the categories just mentioned.

- Numeral will usually be an ordinary number;
- Unit refers to the units used in Numeral;
- Spread is an assessment of the error in the value of the Numeral;
- Assessment is a summary of salient qualitative judgements about the information - this can be of statistical nature (a significance level) or more general, e.g. involving terms such as 'conservative' or 'optimistic'. If the number is model-generated Assessment may include an estimate of the quality of the related uncertainty and sensitivity analysis;
- Pedigree is an evaluative description of the mode of production and of anticipated use of the information.

The pedigree can be expressed by means of a matrix; the columns represent the various phases of production or use of the information, and each column contains marks to rank the performance. Marks can be numerical as well as qualitative, see an example here. Recent applications of NUSAP are in the field of climate science, hydrology, medical research and risk assessment. Applications relevant to the activities of the European Food Safety Authority EFSA are Bouwknegt and Havelaar (2015) and EFSA BIOHAZ Panel, (2015).

Together with Sensitivity auditing NUSAP can be considered as a method useful at the science policy interface - when numbers produced by either experiment, survey or mathematical modelling need to be used in the appraisal or the formulation of a policy. See also Post-normal science.

An early description of NUSAP is due to Funtowicz and Ravetz.
