= Post-normal science =

Problem-solving strategy

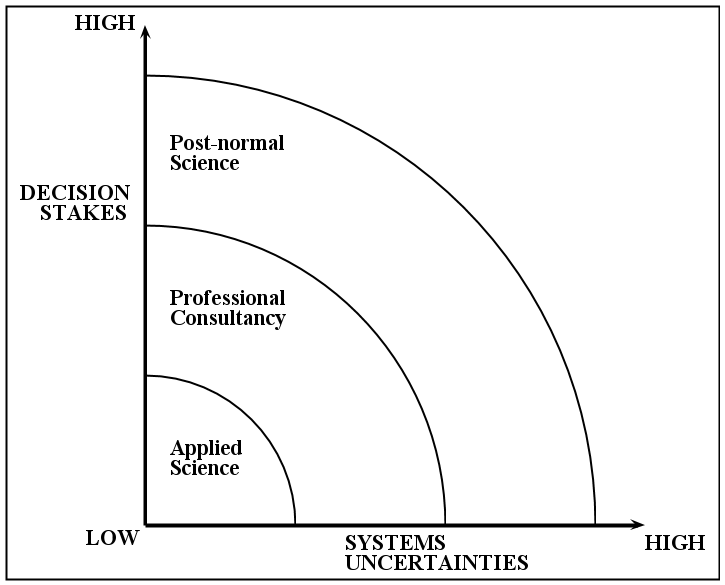
Post-normal science diagram

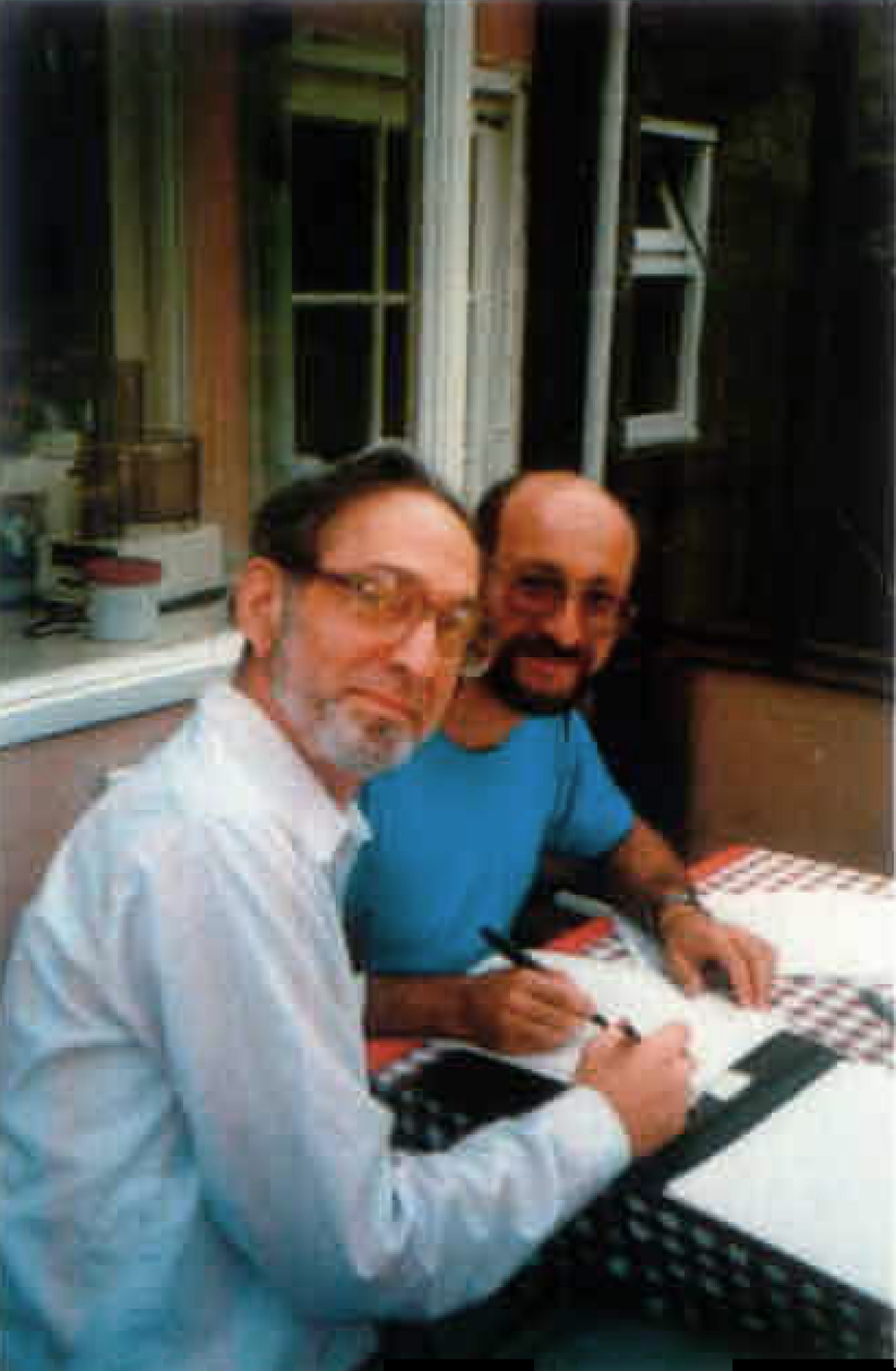
Jerome Ravetz and Silvio Funtowicz, circa 1988, at Sheffield

Post-normal science (PNS) was developed in the 1990s by Silvio Funtowicz and Jerome R. Ravetz. It is a problem-solving strategy appropriate when "facts [are] uncertain, values in dispute, stakes high and decisions urgent", conditions often present in policy-relevant research. In those situations, PNS recommends suspending temporarily the traditional scientific ideal of truth, concentrating on quality as assessed by internal and extended peer communities.

PNS can be considered as complementing the styles of analysis based on risk and cost-benefit analysis prevailing at that time and integrating concepts of a new critical science developed in previous works by the same authors.

PNS is not a new scientific method following Aristotle and Bacon, a new paradigm in the Kuhnian sense, or an attempt to reach a new 'normal'. It is instead, a set of insights to guide actionable and robust knowledge production for policy decision making and action in challenges like pandemics, ecosystems collapse, biodiversity loss and, in general, sustainability transitions.

== Context ==
According to its proponents Silvio Funtowicz and Jerome R. Ravetz, the name "post-normal science" echoes the seminal work on modern science by Thomas Kuhn. For Carrozza PNS can be "framed in terms of a call for the 'democratization of expertise'", and as a "reaction against long-term trends of 'scientization' of politics—the tendency towards assigning to experts a critical role in policymaking while marginalizing laypeople". For Mike Hulme (2007), writing on The Guardian, climate change seems to fall into the category of issues which are best dealt with in the context of PNS and notes that "Disputes in post-normal science focus as often on the process of science – who gets funded, who evaluates quality, who has the ear of policy – as on the facts of science". Climate science as PNS was already proposed by the late Stephen Schneider, and a similar linkage was propose for the workings of the Intergovernmental Panel on Climate Change.

From the ecological perspective post-normal science can be situated in the context of 'crisis disciplines' – a term coined by the conservation biologist Michael E. Soulé to indicate approaches addressing fears, emerging in the seventies, that the world was on the verge of ecological collapse. In this respect Michael Egan defines PNS as a 'survival science'. More recently PNS has been defined as a movement of 'informed critical resistance, reform and the making of futures'.

Moving from PNS Ziauddin Sardar developed the concept of Postnormal Times (PNT). Sardar was the editor of FUTURES when it published the article 'Science for the post-normal age' presently the most cited paper of the journal. A recent review of academic literature conducted on the Web of Science and encompassing the topics of Futures studies, Foresight, Forecasting and Anticipation Practice identifies the same paper as "the all-time publication that received the highest number of citations".

== Content ==
"At birth Post-normal science was conceived as an inclusive set of robust insights more than as an exclusive fully structured theory or field of practice". Some of the ideas underpinning PNS can already be found in a work published in 1983 and entitled "Three types of risk assessment: a methodological analysis" This and subsequent works show that PNS concentrates on few aspects of the complex relation between science and policy: the communication of uncertainty, the assessment of quality, and the justification and practice of the extended peer communities.

Coming to the PNS diagram (figure above) the horizontal axis represents 'Systems Uncertainties' and the vertical one 'Decision Stakes'. The three quadrants identify Applied Science, Professional Consultancy, and Post-Normal Science. Different standards of quality and styles of analysis are appropriate to different regions in the diagram, i.e. post-normal science does not claim relevance and cogency on all of science's application but only on those defined by the PNS's mantram with a fourfold challenge: 'facts uncertain, values in dispute, stakes high and decisions urgent'. For applied research science's own peer quality control system will suffice (or so was assumed at the moment PNS was formulated in the early nineties), while professional consultancy was considered appropriate for these settings which cannot be 'peer-reviewed', and where the skills and the tacit knowledge of a practitioner are needed at the forefront, e.g. in a surgery room, or in a house on fire. Here a surgeon or a firefighter takes a difficult technical decision based on her or his training and appreciation of the situation (the Greek concept of 'Metis' as discussed by J. C. Scott.)

== Complexity ==
There are important linkages between PNS and complexity science, e.g. system ecology (C. S. Holling) and hierarchy theory (Arthur Koestler), see e.g. the work of Joseph Tainter, Timothy F. H. Allen and Thomas W. Hoekstra on transition from fossil to renewable fuels. In PNS, complexity is respected through its recognition of a multiplicity of legitimate perspectives on any issue; this is close to the meaning espoused by the theoretical biologist Robert Rosen. Reflexivity is realised through the extension of accepted 'facts' beyond the supposedly objective productions of traditional research. Also, the new participants in the process are not treated as passive learners at the feet of the experts, being coercively convinced through scientific demonstration. Rather, they will form an 'extended peer community', sharing the work of quality assurance of the scientific inputs to the process, and arriving at a resolution of issues through debate and dialogue. The necessity to embrace complexity in a post-normal perspective to understand and face zoonoses is argumented by David Waltner-Toews.

== Extended peer community ==
In PNS extended peer communities are spaces where perspectives, values, styles of knowing and power differentials are expressed in a context of inequalities and conflict. Resolutions, compromises and knowledge co-production are contingent and not necessarily achievable.

== Applications ==
Beside its dominating influence in the literature on 'futures', PNS is considered to have influenced the ecological 'conservation versus preservation debate', especially via its reading by American pragmatist Bryan G. Norton. According to Jozef Keulartz the PNS concept of "extended peer community" influenced how Norton's developed his 'convergence hypothesis'. The hypothesis posits that ecologists of different orientation will converge once they start thinking 'as a mountain', or as a planet. For Norton this will be achieved via deliberative democracy, which will pragmatically overcome the black and white divide between conservationists and preservationists. More recently it has been argued that conservation science, embedded as it is in a multi-layered governance structures of policy-makers, practitioners, and stakeholders, is itself an 'extended peer community', and as a result conservation has always been 'post-normal'.

Other authors attribute to PNS the role of having stimulated the take up of transdisciplinary methodological frameworks, reliant on the social constructivist perspective embedded in PNS.

Post-normal science is intended as applicable to most instances where the use of evidence is contested due to different norms and values. Typical instances are in the use of evidence-based policy and in evaluation.

As summarized in a recent work "the ideas and concepts of post normal science bring about the emergence of new problem solving strategies in which the role of science is appreciated in its full context of the complexity and the uncertainty of natural systems and the relevance of human commitments and values."

For Peter Gluckman (2014), chief science advisor to the Prime Minister of New Zealand, post-normal science approaches are today appropriate for a host of problems including "eradication of exogenous pests […], offshore oil prospecting, legalization of recreational psychotropic drugs, water quality, family violence, obesity, teenage morbidity and suicide, the ageing population, the prioritization of early-childhood education, reduction of agricultural greenhouse gases, and balancing economic growth and environmental sustainability".

Conservation science is also a field where PNS is suggested as to fill the space between research, policy, and implementation, as well as to ensure pluralism in analysis. Ecosystem services are a topical subject for PNS.

Reviews of the history and evolution of PNS, its definitions, conceptualizations, and uses can be found in Turnpenny et al., 2011, and in The Routledge Handbook of Ecological Economics (Nature and Society). Articles on PNS are published in Nature and related journals.

== Criticism ==
A criticism of post-normal science is offered by Weingart (1997) for whom post-normal science does not introduce a new epistemology but retraces earlier debates linked to the so-called "finalization thesis". For Jörg Friedrichs – comparing the issues of climate change and peak energy – an extension of the peer community has taken place in the climate science community, transforming climate scientists into 'stealth advocates', while scientists working on energy security – without PNS, would still maintain their credentials of neutrality and objectivity. Another criticism is that the extended peer community's use undermines the scientific method's use of empiricism and that its goal would be better addressed by providing greater science education.

== The crisis of science ==
It has been argued that post-normal science scholars have been prescient in anticipating the present crisis in science's quality control and reproducibility. A group of scholars of post-normal science orientation has published in 2016 a volume on the topic, discussing inter alia what this community perceive as the root causes of the present science's crisis.

== Quantitative approaches ==
Among the quantitative styles of analysis which make reference to post-normal science one can mention NUSAP for numerical information, sensitivity auditing for indicators and mathematical modelling, Quantitative storytelling for exploring multiple frames in a quantitative analysis, and MUSIASEM in the field of social metabolism. A work where these approaches are suggested for sustainability is in.

== Mathematical modelling ==
In relation to mathematical modelling post-normal science suggests a participatory approach, whereby 'models to predict and control the future' are replaced by 'models to map our ignorance about the future', in the process exploring and revealing the metaphors embedded in the model. PNS is also known for its definition of garbage in, garbage out (GIGO): in modelling GIGO occurs when the uncertainties in the inputs must be suppressed, lest the outputs become completely indeterminate.

== Special issues ==
The journal FUTURES devoted several specials issues to post-normal science.

- The first was in 1999 and included two editorial pieces, from Jerome Ravetz and Silvio Funtowicz, and from Jerome Ravetz.
- The second special issue, edited by Merryl Wyn Davies, was entitled "Post normal times" in 2011. This was a selection of papers from the symposium "Post Normal Science – perspectives & prospectives 26-27th June 2009, Oxford." A summary of the abstracts can be found on the NUSAP net.
- The third special issue on post-normal science was in 2017. This special issue contains a selection of papers discussed at the University of Bergen's Centre for the Study of the Sciences and the Humanities between 2014 and 2016. The issue includes also two extended commentaries on the present crisis in science and the post-fact/post-truth discourse, one from Europe and one from Japan.

Another special issue on post-normal science was published in 2011 on the journal Science, Technology, & Human Values.

== Bibliography ==
- Ravetz, Jerome R. (1979). Scientific knowledge and its social problems. Oxford: Oxford Univ. Press. ISBN 978-0-19-519721-1.
- Ravetz, Jerome R. (September 1987). "Usable Knowledge, Usable Ignorance: Incomplete Science with Policy Implications". Knowledge. 9 (1): 87–116. doi:10.1177/107554708700900104.
- Funtowicz, S.O. and J.R. Ravetz (1990). Uncertainty and Quality in Science for Policy. Kluwer Academic Publishers, the Netherlands.
- Ravetz, Jerome R. (2005). The No nonsense guide to science. Oxford: New Internationalist.
