= Scientific Knowledge and Its Social Problems =

Book by Jerome Ravetz

- 1973 p/b edition Transaction Publishers
- Author: Jerome Ravetz
- Language: English
- Subject: Science
- Publisher: Oxford University Press
- Publication date: 1971
- Publication place: United States
- Media type: Print
- Pages: 449
- ISBN: 1412833787

Scientific Knowledge and Its Social Problems is a 1971 book by Jerome Ravetz. It contains a reasoned illustration of science as a social process with all the failings and imperfections of other human endeavors.

== Content ==
It is impossible to understand the social and ethical problems confronting science without recognizing the falsity of the assumption, crucial to traditional theories of science, that the results of scientific research must be essentially good and true. Dr. Ravetz demonstrates the role of choice and value-judgment, and the inevitability of error, in scientific research.

Important aspects of the book are the social construction of facts, science as a craft with essential tacit elements, the role of choice and value judgment, and the inevitability of error. The book argues that the internal quality control system of industrialized science will suffer severe problems: "The problem of quality control in science is thus at the centre of the social problems of the industrialized science of the present period." James H. Moor (1973) summarizes the main claims of Ravetz's work are as follows: "First, historically the social character of science has undergone tremendous changes. Secondly, the traditional philosophies of science which conceive of science as an activity in the pursuit of truth are obsolete. And thirdly, it is imperative to develop a new philosophy of science which accounts for the social nature of contemporary science." Ravetz analyzes the transition from basic science to 'industrialized science', with particular attention of issues of degeneration (shoddy science). He also focuses on entrepreneurial science, where a scientist becomes more concerned with research grants and power than with the quality of his scientific research. The need for 'good morale', i.e. for an ethos of science upheld by a community of peers is mentioned in relation to the danger that such an ethos may not survive 'industrialized science'. For Gowing (1974) the main difficulty of this work is the confusion among the different kinds of science addressed by the inquiry: 'natural sciences, pure and applied', versus 'any sort of disciplined inquiry', up to include 'social sciences'.

== Reception ==
For Rothman (1974) Ravetz elucidates "the processes by which genuine and meaningful scientific knowledge accumulates. These chapters – nine in all – form the most interesting and useful part of the book. His description of the emergence and refinement of scientific facts is articulated by the argument that science is craftman's work."

The work is praised by John Ziman, for whom "we may, through books like this, achieve a new level of self-critical science." For Thomas Gieryn writing in 1998 "Ravetz is impressively prescient, but does a better job anticipating what would happen to science by the 1990s than anticipating its sociological understandings."

Anthony Jackson, takes issue against Ravetz's perceived critique of the social sciences as "immature and ineffective fields of inquiry that may be equated with folk-science". The work of Ravetz was also reviewed by Diana Crane, Ardon Lyon, Nathan Reingold, and Dael Wolfle.

A German translation appeared in 1973, and a Japanese one in 1977 by historian of science Shigeru Nakayama. In 1996 there was a second edition with a new introduction by the author with Transaction Publishers that was reviewed by Steven Shapin.
