= Silvio Funtowicz =

Philosopher of science

Silvio Oscar Funtowicz
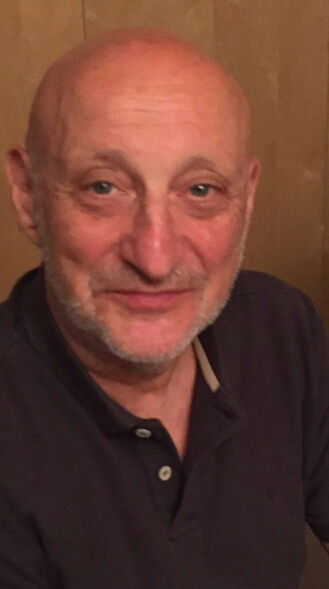
- Spring 2016
- Born: Buenos Aires, Argentina

Philosophical work
- Era: 20th-century philosophy
- Region: Western Philosophy
- School: Post-normal
- Main interests: Philosophy of science
- Notable ideas: NUSAP; Post-normal science Knowledge Assessment

Silvio O. Funtowicz is a philosopher of science active in the field of science and technology studies. He created the NUSAP, a notational system for characterising uncertainty and quality in quantitative expressions, and together with Jerome R. Ravetz he introduced the concept of post-normal science. He is currently a guest researcher at the Centre for the Study of the Sciences and the Humanities (SVT), University of Bergen (Norway).

== Biography ==
Silvio Funtowicz began his career teaching mathematics, logic and research methodology in Buenos Aires, Argentina. He left Argentina during the military dictatorship, and moved to England where, during the 1980s he was a Research Fellow at the University of Leeds, where he started his cooperation with Jerome Ravetz. Until his retirement in 2011, he was a scientific officer at the Joint Research Centre of the European Commission (EC-JRC). In 2012 he became a professor at the Centre for the Study of the Sciences and the Humanities (SVT) at the University of Bergen, Norway, and since 2021 he has been a guest researcher there.

== Work ==
Silvio Funtowicz' work with Jerome R. Ravetz Uncertainty and Quality in Science for Policy started a series of reflections on the quality of science used for policy, mostly in connection with environmental and technological risks and policy-related research, introducing NUSAP a notational system for the management and communication of uncertainty in science for policy. NUSAP's applications to different settings were spearheaded in the Netherlands by Jeroen van der Sluijs et al. 2005. Based on this ground work the concept of post-normal science was introduced in a series of papers published in the early nineties.

The article 'Science for the post-normal age' is presently the most cited paper in the journal Futures. Another paper of note is 'The worth of a songbird: ecological economics as a post-normal science' in Ecological Economics.

Today post-normal science (PNS) is intended as applicable to most instances where the use of evidence is contested due to different norms and values. For Peter Gluckman (2014), chief science advisor to the Prime Minister of New Zealand, post-normal science approaches are today appropriate for a host of problems including "eradication of exogenous pests […], offshore oil prospecting, legalization of recreational psychotropic drugs, water quality, family violence, obesity, teenage morbidity and suicide, the ageing population, the prioritization of early-childhood education, reduction of agricultural greenhouse gases, and balancing economic growth and environmental sustainability".

For Carrozza PNS can be "framed in terms of a call for the 'democratization of expertise'", and as a "reaction against long-term trends of 'scientization' of politics—the tendency towards assigning to experts a critical role in policymaking while marginalizing laypeople".

Funtowicz' most recent work – with Roger Strand - has touched upon the issue of agency at times of change, arguing that a risk centred vision based on prediction and control in front of global and emerging threats should be replaced by one based on commitment: "rather than believing that contemporary global challenges will be sufficiently met by being responsible under risk, we will ask how to stay committed in times of change." Together with Ângela Guimarães Pereira he curated a volume for Oxford University Press 'Science for Policy: New Challenges, New Opportunities', and another with Routledge on the End of the Cartesian Dream which represent an important collective effort gathering three generations of scholars active in the field of PNS, followed a year later by a multi-authors book by the same community on the reproducibility and quality control crisis of science. Together with Andrea Saltelli and others, he developed the concept of sensitivity auditing, an extension of sensitivity analysis for statistical and mathematical models used as input to policy design and appraisal. He has authored with Alice Benessia a series of works on innovations and technoscience. These are critical essays on what it means for a society to be 'smart' and 'sustainable'. With Jerome R. Ravetz he recently contributed two original voices to the Encyclopaedia of the Social and Behavioral Sciences (Oxford) on 'Peer Review and Quality Control' and on 'New Forms of Science. Since the nineties he has worked with Bruna De Marchi and others on risk governance and public participation.

In the 1990s, Silvio Funtowicz collaborated with the late James J. Kay and other members of what some have called the "Dirk Gently Gang" (including Mario Giampietro and David Waltner-Toews) on the Ecosystem Approach. This work, linking complexity theory, thermodynamics, and post-normal science, explored implications of this "new science" for environmental management and human well-being. Another scholar Silvio Funtowicz cooperates with is Martin O'Connor. His most recent work focuses on the crisis in the quality control of science, its impact on science's social functions, the possible flaring of old and new science wars, and the COVID-19 pandemic.

== Bibliography ==
- Funtowicz, Silvio O.; Ravetz, Jerome R. (1990). Uncertainty and Quality in Science for Policy. Boston: Kluwer Academic Publishers. ISBN 978-0-7923-0799-0.

== See also ==
- NUSAP
- post-normal science
- Jerome Ravetz
