= Jerome Ravetz =

American philosopher

Jerome Raymond Ravetz
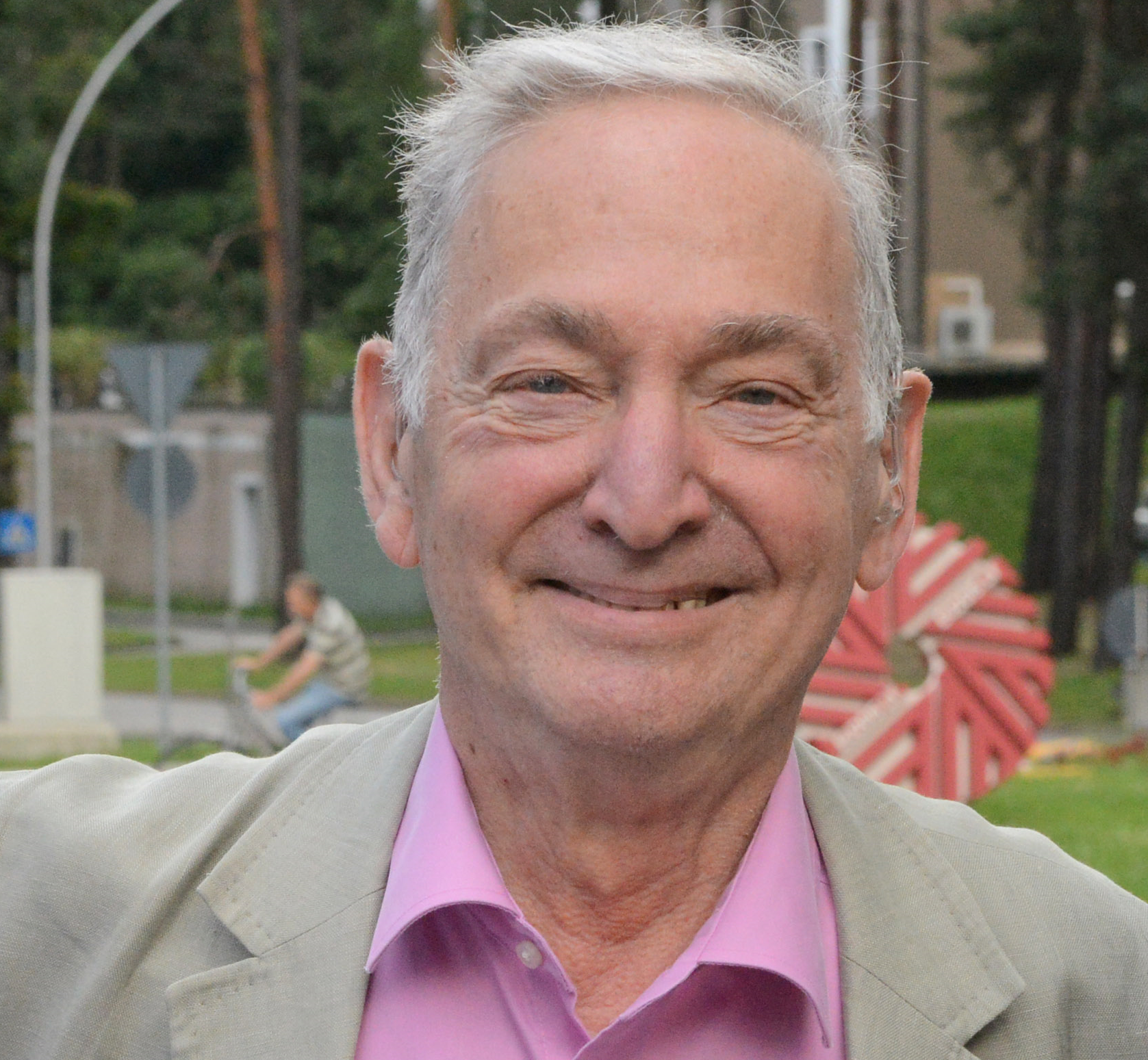
- Born: June 10, 1929 (age 97); Philadelphia, US

Education
- Education: University of Cambridge (England) and Swarthmore College (Philadelphia)

Philosophical work
- Era: 20th-century philosophy
- Region: Western Philosophy
- School: Post-normal
- Main interests: Philosophy of science
- Notable ideas: NUSAP; Post-normal science

Jerome (Jerry) Ravetz is a philosopher of science. He is best known for his books analysing scientific knowledge from a social and ethical perspective, focusing on issues of quality. He is the co-author (with Silvio Funtowicz) of the NUSAP notational system and of Post-normal science. He is currently an Associate Fellow at the Institute for Science, Innovation and Society, University of Oxford.

== Life and work ==
Ravetz was born in Philadelphia; his grandfather was a Russian-Jewish immigrant and his father a truck driver and trade union organiser. He attended Central High School and Swarthmore College. He came to England in 1950 on a Fulbright Scholarship to Trinity College, Cambridge, where he studied for a PhD in Pure Mathematics under the supervision of A.S. Besicovitch. In 1955 his passport was taken away, as part of the wave of McCarthyism; it was returned in 1958 and in 1961 he became a British citizen. He taught mathematics at the University of Pennsylvania and then at Durham University. In 1957 he moved to the University of Leeds to join Stephen Toulmin in the establishment of a centre in the History and Philosophy of Science. He stayed at Leeds, eventually becoming a Reader, until taking early retirement in 1983. Since then he has been an independent scholar.

He has visited at Utrecht University, Harvard University, the Institute for Advanced Study, the University of California, Santa Cruz, Fudan University (Shanghai), the University of Texas at Dallas, the Carnegie Mellon University and the University of Luxembourg. Over the years he has worked closely with colleagues at the European Commission Joint Research Centre, Ispra, Italy.

Ravetz's earliest research, after mathematics, was in the history of the mathematical sciences, with works on Copernicus and Fourier. In the sixties Ravetz, focused on contradictions in the functioning of science and its image, between a narrative of progress and one of depredation science. He had proposed an unusual approach to study these contradictions. He highlighted the craft character of scientific knowledge, a set of procedures and evaluations that are part of the social activity of science. The quality of research, according to Ravetz, is influenced by this social component of scientific knowledge, which is strongly influenced by the professional models communicated through teaching. Due to this, the standard of adequacy is set by norms culturally stablished and shared.

His influential book Scientific Knowledge and Its Social Problems went through several English language editions, plus German and Japanese translations, and was republished in 1996. This book raises issues of uncertainty and ethics in the social practice of science. It was an early attempt to recast the philosophy of science for the conditions of 'industrialised science' and to shift the philosophy of science from epistemology to the social and ethical aspects of science. In it he proposed a 'critical science' for a new version of the idealism that had characterised science in the pre-industrial age.

In the years around 1970 he was an active member of the British Society for Social Responsibility in Science.

From 1973 to 1976 he was Executive Secretary of the Council for Science and Society in London, whose founder was the law reformer Paul Sieghart. He drafted its report on 'The Acceptability of Risks'. From 1977 to 1978, he was a member of the Genetic Manipulation Advisory Group, regulating research in recombinant DNA. Working with Silvio Funtowicz in Leeds he created the NUSAP notational system, described in their book Uncertainty and Quality in Science for Policy (Reidel 1990). This was the stimulus for the development of the 'Guidance' for managing uncertainty, at the Netherlands Environment Agency. They also created the theory of Post-normal science, which applies when 'Facts are uncertain, values in dispute, stakes high and decisions urgent.' A collection of his essays, The merger of knowledge with power: essays in critical science was also published in 1990. With Zia Sardar he co-authored Cyberfutures: Culture and Politics on the Information Superhighway in 1996.[2] His most recent book is The No nonsense guide to science (New Internationalist 2006). His research continues in two main directions: new trends in the social practice of science; and new approaches to the management of uncertainty. On the former, he has co-authored (with Silvio Funtowicz) chapters on 'Science, New Forms of' and 'Peer Review and Quality Control' for the International Encyclopedia of Social and Behavioral Sciences (2015). On the latter he is concerned with the analysis of ignorance and the representation and manipulation of quantitative information where there is 'not even one significant digit'. He has also recently written on the quality control crisis of science.

He is currently an Associate Fellow at the Institute for Science, Innovation and Society at the University of Oxford. His research focus is on the impacts of technological progress on science, and new forms of science governance necessary for the protection of society, the environment and science itself. Ravetz studies new institutional models and collective behaviors that rehabilitate the function of science as a solver of the problem of the sustainability of contemporary material society that derives from the ongoing technological development.

He was interviewed by the Great Transition Initiative's blog in June 2016. On May 31, 2019, the Institute for Science, Innovation and Society in Oxford has devoted a seminar to honour his 90th birthday. He published a World View piece in the journal Nature on November 19, 2019, entitled Stop the science training that demands 'don't ask'. Science governance, unknown unknowns, science as a solver of the problem of the sustainability of society are tackled in the context of present debates. Together with other scholars, Ravetz has contributed to the debate on the COVID-19 pandemic and use of mathematical models.

== Quotes ==
"The activity of modern natural science has transformed our knowledge and control of the world about us; but in the process it has also transformed itself; and it has created problems that natural science alone cannot solve". Scientific Knowledge and its Social Problems, Oxford 1971, p. 9.

"Wherever there's a system, there's a racket to beat it." Ibidem, p. 295.

"Any artifact will have: intended use, creative new use, incompetent misuse and malevolent abuse".

== Bibliography ==
- Ravetz, Jerome R. (1979). Scientific knowledge and its social problems. Oxford: Oxford Univ. Press. ISBN 0-19-519721-6.
- Ravetz, Jerome R. (1990). The merger of knowledge with power: essays in critical science. London [England]: Mansell. ISBN 0-7201-2021-7.
- Funtowicz, Silvio O.; Ravetz, Jerome R. (1990). Uncertainty and Quality in Science for Policy. Boston: Kluwer Academic Publishers. ISBN 0-7923-0799-2.
- Ravetz, Jerome R.; Sardar, Ziauddin (1996). Cyberfutures: culture and politics on the information superhighway. New York: New York University Press. ISBN 0-8147-8058-X.
- Ravetz, Jerome R. (2005). The No nonsense guide to science. Oxford: New Internationalist.
- Ravetz, Jerome R. (1965). Astronomy and cosmology in the achievement of Nicolaus Copernicus. Wrocław, Poland: Zakład Narodowy im. Ossolińskich. Bibcode:1965acan.book.....R.
- Ravetz, Jerome R. (Winter 1997). "In Numbers We Trust". Issues in Science and Technology. 13 (2).

== See also ==
- Post-normal science
- American philosophy
- List of American philosophers
- Science wars
- Gaming the system
- Goodhart's Law
- Silvio Funtowicz
