= The Politics of Modelling, Numbers Between Science and Policy =

Book published in 2023

- Editors: Andrea Saltelli; Monica Di Fiore
- Language: English
- Subjects: Mathematical modelling Social statistics Politics
- Publisher: Oxford University Press
- Publication date: August 2023
- Pages: 272
- ISBN: 978-0198872412

The Politics of Modelling, Numbers Between Science and Policy is a multi-authors book edited by Andrea Saltelli and Monica Di Fiore and published in August 2023 by Oxford University Press.

== Synopsis ==
The Politics of Modelling elaborates and expands on themes of responsible modelling from a manifesto published in the journal Nature in 2020. The text is structured into three main sections: Meeting Models, The Rules, and The Rules in Practice. The combination of theory with policy relevant examples makes the book accessible to modellers, researchers of modelling, and policy makers.

The volume comes with a foreword of Wendy Nelson Espeland and a preface of Daniel Sarewitz, with chapters from Andy Stirling, Wolfgang Drechsler, Philip B. Stark, Ting Xu, Paolo Vineis, Andrea Saltelli, and other scholars.

== Reception ==
The book argues that models live in a "state of exception" provided by their access to a wealth of methodology of analysis, and by their epistemic authority borrowed from mathematics. This state allows models to better defend an appearance of neutrality that is appreciated by policymakers in search of a justification. A review published in the Science notes that the volume incorporated insights from science and technology studies to explore modeling beyond its technical aspects A second review in the Minerva notes the book's reference to the works of historians Margaret Morrison and Mary S. Morgan in considering models as mediators whereby models are simultaneously a tool, an interpretation, and a representation of the system.

The book contrasts the danger of cynicism with suggestions to make models serve society, based on theory, examples, and a call for participatory modelling linked to Post-normal science, sensitivity auditing and the concept of extended peer community. Reviewers also noted that the book ignores other ongoing efforts in enhancing or formalizing modelling practices such as the framework proposed van Voorn, and the Good Modelling Practice handbook developed for water management purposes in the Netherlands. Reviewers pointed to the book's failure to cover the 'fit-for purpose' movement in modelling. Other points where the book was found to be lacking by critics were the challenge of participatory modelling, related to gaming and power relations such as Arnsteinds' ladder of participation.

A review in Mathematics Magazine notes the book's attention to sensitivity analysis: "[The authors] stress the importance of sensitivity analysis, with a highly-illustrative and illuminating example that analyzes the EOQ (economic order quantity) formula." Another review in the journal Acta Sociologica notes that the collection brings the reflexive sensibility of social criticism to realworld applications: the pandemic, certainly, but also other arenas in which modeling serves as a technology of governance such as economics and climate change.

== Links ==
- Saltelli, A. and Di Fiore, M. (eds) (2023) The politics of modelling. Numbers between science and policy. Oxford: Oxford University Press, at OUP website.
- Chapters available in open access.
- Models: a state of exception, Oxford Martin School, November 20 2023, Launch of The Politics of Modelling – video.
- Podcast – interview for ABC NET RADIO, AUS August 26, 2023: Assumptions and consequences: the politics of modelling, Guests: Ehsan Nabavi and Andrea Saltelli, Producer – Chris Bullock.

== See also ==
- Sociology of quantification
- Ethics of quantification
- Sensitivity analysis
- Sensitivity auditing

== Related readings ==
- Desrosières, Alain. (1998). The Politics of Large Numbers: a history of statistical reasoning, Harvard University Press.
- Scoones, I., & Stirling, A. (2020). The Politics of Uncertainty. (I. Scoones & A. Stirling, Eds.), Abingdon, Oxon; New York, NY: Routledge, 2020. Series: Pathways to sustainability: Routledge. doi:10.4324/9781003023845
- Mennicken, A., & Salais, R. (Eds.). (2022b). The New Politics of Numbers: Utopia, Evidence and Democracy, Palgrave Macmillan.
