= Trust in Numbers =

1995 non-fiction book by Theodore Porter

Trust in Numbers: The Pursuit of Objectivity in Science and Public Life
- Author: Theodore Porter
- Language: English
- Subjects: Sociology of quantification Politics; History of Statistics
- Publisher: Princeton University Press
- Publication date: 1995
- Pages: 328
- ISBN: 978-0691029085

Trust in Numbers: The Pursuit of Objectivity in Science and Public Life is a book by Theodore Porter, published in 1995 by Princeton University Press, that proposes that quantification in public life is driven by bureaucratic necessities to obtain legitimacy through objectivity.

== Synopsis ==
In Trust in Numbers: The Pursuit of Objectivity in Science and Public Life, Theodore Porter reverses the classic notion that quantification descends from the successes of natural sciences being adopted by other disciplines, to investigate instead the opposite movement, whereby quantification is driven by political, administrative and bureaucratic necessities to standardize, communicate, and obtain legitimacy through objectivity.

The appeal of numbers is especially compelling to bureaucratic officials who lack the mandate of a popular election, or divine right, p. 8.

After noting how officials fear being criticized for arbitrariness and bias, he concludes:

A decision made by the numbers (or by explicit rules of some other sort) has at least the appearance of being fair and impersonal, p. 8.

Thus, "trust may sometimes be based less on the solidity of the numbers themselves than on the needs of expert and client communities".

== Analysis ==
Defined as the book that comes closest to establishing a common theoretical language for sociology of quantification, the work of Porter adopts a historical and sociological style of analysis that is indebted to Bruno Latour and Steven Shapin. An important element of Porter's analysis concerns the meaning of objectivity and how it has arisen historically, and what role numbers have played in its construction. For Porter, 'mechanical objectivity' is sought and obtained via quantitative methods that ensure a procedural forms of accountability. He calls these procedures 'technologies of distance' that ensure compliance with impersonal rules excluding bias and personal preferences.

Based on a number of case studies in different countries — actuaries in the UK and US, engineers in France and in the US — Porter demonstrates that the allure of quantitative and standardized measures does not derive from their success in the natural sciences, but arise from the need of professional groups to "respond to external social and political pressures demanding accountability".

The author traces the history of cost-benefit analysis in a way that make evident the bureaucratic and political conflicts whereby actuaries and experts of different disciplines fought to maintain structures of power and privilege within national styles and contexts. In the US, tensions existed between the Bureau of Reclamation and the Army Corps of Engineers. Each institution produced cost-benefit analyses that were designed to favor the respective interests of the two institutions and their respective stakeholders. In Victorian England actuaries and the accountants fought to thwart attempts by the authorities to introduce standards of accounting, as to defend the nuanced expertise of the respective crafts. In a sense, the work of Porter makes clear how objectivity is an alternative to personal trust. He illustrates the point by comparing the practices and contexts of the Army Corps of Engineers in the US versus those of Les Ingénieurs des Ponts et Chaussées in France (pp. 114–190).

The very last chapter of Trust in Numbers shows — following a critical path opened by Sharon Traweek, p. 222 — that in the most highly developed and leading research communities, for example among high-energy physicists, numbers and quantification are not center stage — a place that is taken by a community of trust, where a "personal knowledge" is at play, that ensures the creativity and vitality of the discipline, a point made by other STS scholars. As noted by the author, the quantitative element of 'mechanical objectivity' is more present in academic fields like economics, sociology and psychology than they are in physics. This chapter has been suggested as the most relevant for practicing research scientists.

For sociologist Trevor Pinch the most important aspect of this book is to demystify the concept that the more mathematical the science, the higher its prestige, and to achieve this through a comparative investigation of how different sciences make use of mathematics in different contexts".

Trust in Numbers has been suggested as of particular relevance to the field of Digital Humanities.

== Reception ==
In 1997, Porter was awarded the Ludwik Fleck Prize for Trust in Numbers. More than 40 reviews have been written about the book, including from Michel Callon, Philip Mirowski, Sheila Jasanoff, Roy MacLeod, Mary S. Morgan, Trevor Pinch, Jerry Ravetz, Jessica Riskin, E. Roy Weintraub, and many others.

== See also ==
- Sociology of quantification
- Ethics of quantification

== Related readings ==
- Desrosières, Alain, 1998, The Politics of Large Numbers, a history of statistical reasoning, Harvard University Press.
- Mennicken, A., & Espeland, W. N. (2019). What's New with Numbers? Sociological Approaches to the Study of Quantification. Annual Review of Sociology, 45(1), 223–245.
- Mennicken, A., & Salais, R. (Eds.). (2022). : The New Politics of Numbers: Utopia, Evidence and Democracy, Palgrave Macmillan
