= Sociology of quantification =

The sociology of quantification is the investigation of quantification as a sociological phenomenon in its own right.

== Content ==
According to a review published in 2018, the sociology of quantification is an expanding field which includes the literature on the quantified self, on algorithms, and on various forms of metrics and indicators. A prior review in 2016 names a similar range of topics: "quantification processes in the sciences, quantification in society driven by the sciences, quantification processes driven by other social processes, including for example implementations of numeric technologies, standardization procedures, bureaucratic management, political decision-taking and newer trends as self-quantification." Older works which can be classified under the heading of the sociology of quantification are Theodore Porter’s Trust in Numbers, the works of French sociologists Pierre Bourdieu and Alain Desrosières, and the classic works on probability by Ian Hacking and Lorraine Daston. The discipline gained traction due to the increasing importance and scope of quantification, its relation to the economics of conventions, and the perception of its dangers as a weapon of oppression or as means to undesirable ends.

For Sally Engle Merry quantification is a technology of control, but whether it is reformist or authoritarian depends on who harnessed it and for what purpose. The ‘governance by numbers’ is seen by jurist Alain Supiot as repudiating the goal of governing by just laws, advocating in its stead the attainment of measurable objectives. For Supiot the normative use of economic quantification leaves no option for countries and economic actors than to ride roughshod over social legislation, and pledge allegiance to stronger powers.

The French movement of ‘statactivisme’ suggests fighting numbers with numbers under the slogan “a new number is possible". On the other extreme, algorithmic automation is seen as an instrument of liberation by Aaron Bastani, spurring a debate on digital socialism. According to Espeland and Stevens an ethics of quantification would naturally descend from a sociology of quantification, especially at an age where democracy, merit, participation, accountability and even "fairness" are assumed to be best discovered and appreciated via numbers. Andrea Mennicken and Wendy Espeland provide a review (2019) of the main concerns about the "increasing expansion of quantification into all realms, including into people’s personal lives". These authors discuss the new patterns of visibility and obscurity created by quantitative technologies, how these influence relations of power, and how neoliberal regimes of quantification favour 'economization', where "individuals, activities, and organizations are constituted or framed as economic actors and entities." Mennicken and Robert Salais have curated in 2022 a multi-author volume titled The New Politics of Numbers: Utopia, Evidence and Democracy, with contributions encompassing Foucauldian studies of governmentality, which first flourished in the English-speaking world, and studies of state statistics known as ‘economics of convention’, developed mostly at INSEE in France. A theme treated by several authors is the relationship between quantification and democracy, with regimes of algorithmic governmentality and artificial intelligence posing a threat to democracy and to democratic agency.

Mathematical modelling is a field of interest for sociology of quantification, and the intensified use of mathematical models in relation to the COVID-19 pandemic has spurred a debate on how society uses models. Rhodes and Lancaster speak of 'model as public troubles' and starting from models as boundary objects call for a better relation between models and society. Other authors propose five principles for making models serve society, on the premise that modelling is a social activity. Models as mediators between 'theories' and 'the world' are discussed in a multi-author book edited by Mary S. Morgan and Margaret Morrison that offers several examples from physics and economics. The volume provides a historical and philosophical discussion of what models are and of what models do, with contributions from the authors as well as from scholars such as Ursula Klein, Marcel Boumans, R.I.G. Hughes, Mauricio Suárez, Geert Reuten, Nancy Cartwright, Adrienne van den Boogard, and Stephan Hartmann. A later work by Morgan offers elements of history, sociology and epistemology of modelling in economics and econometrics. Relevant material for a sociology of mathematical models can be found in the works of Ian Scoones and Andy Stirling, in Mirowski’s Machine Dreams, in Evelyn Fox Keller Making Sense of Life, Jean Baudrillard's Simulacra and Simulation, in Bruno Latour and Steve Woolgar's Laboratory Life.

The role of quantification in historiography and macrohistory is the subject of The Measure of Reality: Quantification in Western Europe, 1250-1600, a 1997 nonfiction book by Alfred W. Crosby. The book examines the origins and effects of quantitative thinking in post-medieval European history, suggesting it as a major factor in the ensuing development of European arts and techniques.

== Links ==
- Algorithmic Justice League.
- Cardiff University: “Data Justice Lab”, School of Journalism, Media and Culture.
- French National Research Institute for Sustainable Development: “Project SSSQ - Society for the Social Studies of Quantification.
