= The New Politics of Numbers =

2022 book by multiple authors

The New Politics of Numbers: Utopia, Evidence and Democracy
- Editors: Andrea Mennicken; Robert Salais
- Language: English
- Subjects: Social statistics Politics
- Publisher: Palgrave Macmillan
- Publication date: 2022
- Pages: 497
- ISBN: 978-3-03-078201-6

The New Politics of Numbers: Utopia, evidence and democracy is a multi-author book edited by sociologists Andrea Mennicken and Robert Salais and published in 2022 by Palgrave Macmillan.

== Synopsis ==
This work builds on the 1989 volume The Politics of Numbers of William Alonso and Paul Starr, as well as Alain Desrosières’ The Politics of Large Numbers, the contributions of Laurent Thévenot, and other scholars in France and the UK. The volume sets out to investigate the power of statistics, how they travel across countries and domains, how they may be implicated in policy reform, and how they establish accountability and regulation. The book devotes particular attention to the linkages between statistics and democracy.

The book was inspired by a working group on social quantification at the Wissenschaftskolleg zu Berlin in 2014. It is inspired by two strands of research: one related to Foucauldian ideas of power and control, which were studied by historians and sociologists at the London School of Economics; and the other being the "economics of conventions" or "theory of conventions", studied by various French scholars, including Luc Boltanski, Laurent Thévenot, and originally by Alain Desrosières.

== Content ==
Peter Miller's chapter investigates the role of statistics in design of health policies. The role of quantification in international certification standards is discussed by Thévenot. Uwe Vormbusch provides recounts the quantified self movement, while Boris Samuel provides an example of Statactivism staged in French Guadeloupe. Ota De Leonardis discusses how statistics permit a semantic shift in the meaning of inequality. The book also contains chapters from other scholars such as Emmanuel Didier, Martine Mespoulet, Tom Lang, Corine Eyraud and others. Wendy Nelson Espeland writes the foreword "What Numbers Do".

== Reception ==
Harro Maas writes that "it is just impossible to open a newspaper or news site without being reminded of the themes addressed in this volume" after having read the book.

== Related readings ==
- Alain Desrosières, The Politics of Large Numbers: a history of statistical reasoning, Harvard University Press (1998).
- Alonso, W., & Starr, P. (1989). The Politics of Numbers, Russell Sage Foundation.
- Bessy, C., & Didry, C. (Eds.). (2022). L’économie est une science réflexive, Chômage, convention et capacité dans l’œuvre de Robert Salais, Presses Universitaires du Septentrion.
- Theodore M. Porter, Trust in Numbers: The Pursuit of Objectivity in Science and Public Life, Princeton University Press, 1995.

== See also ==
- Sociology of quantification
