= Models as Mediators =

1999 book

Models as Mediators: Perspectives on Natural and Social Science
- Editors: Mary S. Morgan; Margaret Morrison
- Language: English
- Subjects: Sociology of quantification Philosophy of Science; Economics
- Publisher: Cambridge University Press
- Publication date: 1999
- Pages: 401
- ISBN: 978-0521650977

Models as Mediators: Perspectives on Natural and Social Science is a multi-author book edited by Mary S. Morgan and Margaret Morrison and published in 1999 by Cambridge University Press.

== Synopsis ==
The volume looks at the working of models in the social and natural sciences, with a focus in economics and physics. The book illustrate the concept of models as mediating between theory and the world and yet independent from both. It offers a historical and philosophical discussion of what models are and of what models do, with detailed examples written by the same editors and scholars such as Ursula Klein, Marcel Boumans, R.I.G. Hughes, Mauricio Suárez, Geert Reuten, Nancy Cartwright, Adrienne van den Boogard and Stephan Hartmann.

== Content ==
Models and theories are related, so that an evolution in the perception of what a scientific theory is also chances the perception of what models are. The concept of scientific theory has moved from the 'received view' - whereby a theory can be seen as an axiomatic system to be dealt with in the context of the discipline of logic, to a new conception of theory as framed in therms of semantics, whereby models acquire a new prominence as 'fundamental unit of scientific theorizing, theories themselves being families of models'. Most of the examples in the book are quite articulated and pertinent to either physics or economics, with one, offered by historian of science Ursula Klein, in Chemistry.

The introduction written by Margaret Morrison and Mary S. Morgan discusses the syntactic versus semantic view of theories and how these consider models. The second chapter by the same authors entitled 'Models as mediating instruments' — a key chapter in the economy of the volume, introduces the unifying theme of the work: the concept of models as mediators between theory and world. Models may represent 'some aspect of our theories about the world'.{rp|11}. While they may act as mediators between theory and world, they are situated outside the theory-world axis'.{rp|11}

We believe there is a significant connection between the autonomy of models and their ability to function as instruments. It is precisely because models are partially independent of both theories and the world that they have this autonomous component and so can be used as instrument of exploration in both domains.[1]: 10 

The chapter also details what has been called a 'functionalist' articulation of the difference between models and theory, namely in four functions served by models: the first is how they are constructed deriving elements from one or more theories, other models, and the world. The second function is the use of models as instruments for the exploration and development of theory and or for the design of better experiments. The third is their use to 'represent' beyond what a theory alone can offer. The fourth function is the capacity of the model to enhance learning - though this function is also present in the preceding three steps. Morrison and Morgan emphasize that models can thus be regarded as 'technologies for investigation' — one learns by manipulating and playing with them. Models

have the quality of a technology — the power of the model only becomes apparent in the context of its use.[1]: 12 

Chapter 3 by Margaret Morrison, entitled 'Models as autonomous agents', elaborates on the autonomy of models with example from physics. Chapter 4 'Built in justification' is from Marcel Boumans. Using examples from economics Boumans shows that models 'integrate a broader range of ingredients than only theory and data': these are theoretical notions, mathematical concepts and techniques, stylized facts, empirical data, policy views, analogies, metaphors.

Chapter 5 from R.I.G. Hughes, discusses how the development of computers and simulation changed the relation between models and theory. It was the use of computer simulation that permitted the Ising model to be accepted. In Chapter 6 by Ursula Klein chemical formulae as developed by Jöns Jacob Berzelius in 1813 are presented as 'paper tools' permitting representation and the construction of models. In Chapter 6 Mauricio Suárez discusses how an essential feature of models as mediators is to possibly replace the phenomenon itself in becoming the focus of scientific research, and illustrate this feature with an example from superconductivity in physics.

Chapter 8 from Geert Reuten, 'Knife edge caricature modelling: the case of Marx's reproduction schema' is a 'detailed historical reconstruction' or exegesis of Marxian economics, with little general theory of models. Chapter 9 from Nancy Cartwright 'Models and the limit of theory: quantum Hamiltonians and the BCS model of superconductivity' distinguishes what she call representative models that are accurate to the phenomena from more theory-internal models, models that bridge element of the theory with one another, and that are named interpretative models, especially in fields such as quantum mechanics, quantum electrodynamics, classical mechanics and classical electromagnetic theory. For example, an abstract concept such as force 'can only exist in particular mechanical models'.

Adrienne van den Boogard notes that 'the model is also a social and political device', and shows how institutions can be 'influenced (but were also conditioned by) the usage of different models and statistical techniques.' van den Boogard provides an illustration based on economic models and index numbers developed in the Netherlands. In discussing for example unemployment statistics:

Even the most simple-looking figure, i.e. absolute numbers, reflect an institutional structure, embody work of people (filling questionnaires) as consequence of which the actual figures represent a specific group of unemployed, namely those who found their job via the official employment offices.

For Stephan Hartmann empirical adequacy and logical consistency are not the only criteria of models acceptance. The story told by a model matters to its acceptability, and thus to its function and quality. The argument is developed in the final chapter of the volume entitled 'Models and stories in hadron physics'.

== Reception ==
One review notes that while the title appears to promise a unified theory of models the chapters point instead to a universe of possible ways to characterize the nature and use of models. Acting as mediators, models are partly independent from both theory and world, and this independence, that ensures the versatility of 'models as autonomous agents', is also the reason why they resist an attempt to a unified 'theory of models'.

But the individual chapters make clear why Models as Mediators cannot possibly offer such a theory: the models dealt with in the book are so diverse and disparate that they cannot really be covered by a general description.[2]

The 'functionalist' — rather than philosophical approach of the work, i.e. more about what a model does than what a model is, leaves several questions unanswered (or answered in different ways in different chapters). Furthermore, the examples are quite technical and detailed, not easy to read for the non initiated. Important epistemological questions left open concerns for example why individual models are constructed with the particular degrees of independence from theory and experiment. Being focused on models in physics, chemistry and economics, the book leaves out biological models.

The book lays the basis for a research programme for studying models from the point of view of scientific practice providing 'a potential bridge between philosophical theorising and the more practice-oriented approach of STS'.

== See also ==
- Sociology of quantification
- Frigg, R. and Hartman, S., Models in Science, Stanford Encyclopedia, 2006.
