= Statactivism =

The French movement of statactivism advocates for the mobilization of statistics in support to social movements and agendas.

== Content ==
The program of French statactivistts is to ‘fight against’ as well as ‘fight with’ numbers, using a variety of possible strategies:

- ‘Statistical judo’. This is a strategy of self-defence, whereby existing measures are ‘gamed’ as prescribed by the Goodhart's law;
- Denouncing the inadequacy or bias or unfairness of existing indicators and measures, e.g. from official statistics of poverty or inequality;
- Developing alternative indicators to substitute for those above;
- Identifying social contexts and problems which are invisible to existing statistics

Statactivism's intellectually belongs to the tradition of sociology of numbers. Following Alain Desrosières and Theodore Porter, statactivists use statistics as a “tool of weakness”, which offer to the weak members of society the opportunity to act against their oppression by making injustice visible.

== See also ==
- Sociology of quantification
- Ethics of quantification
- Society for the Social Studies of Quantification - SSSQ
- Data activism
