= Andrea Saltelli =

Italian researcher (born 1953)

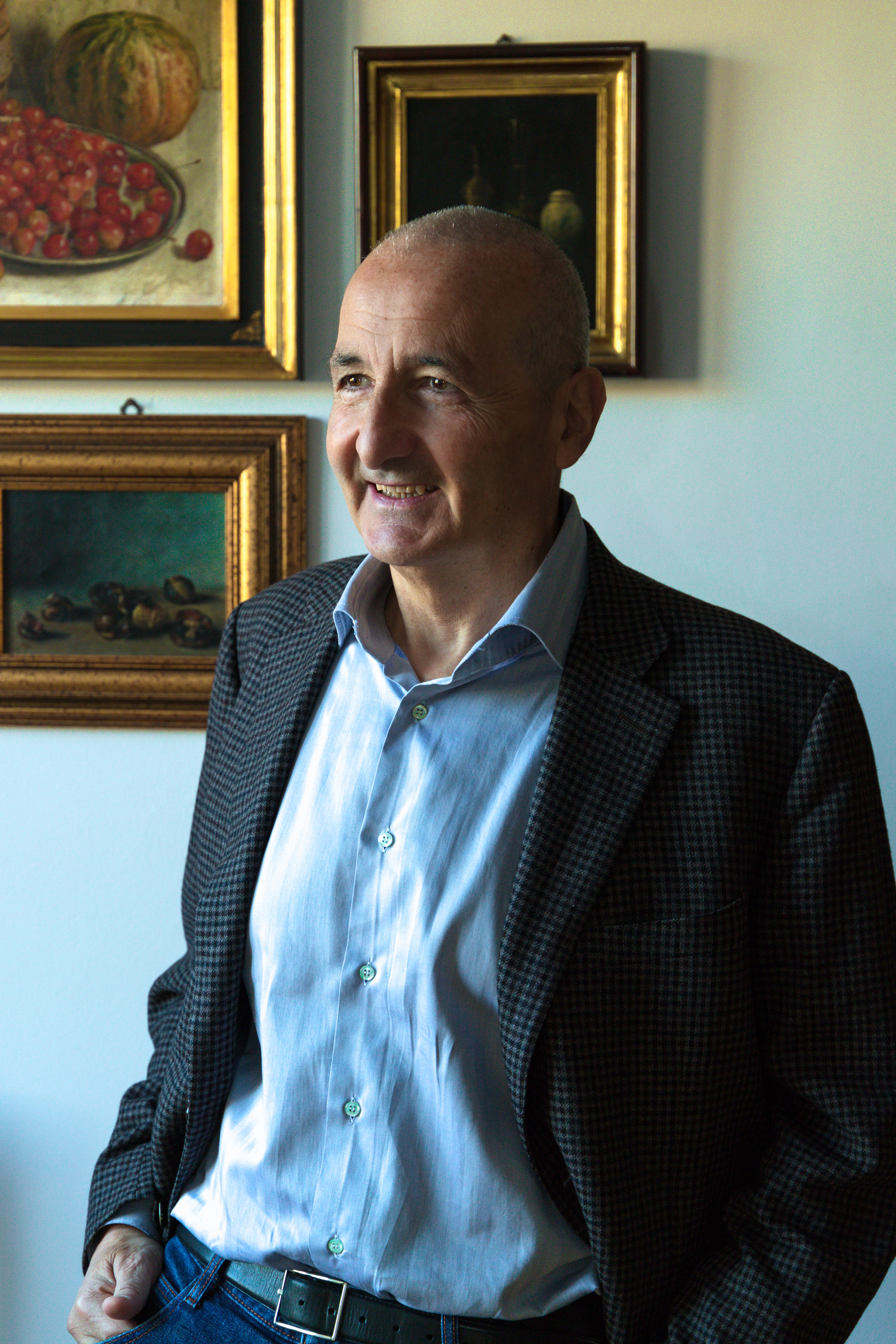
- Born: August 26, 1953 (age 73); Rome, Italy
- Education: Sapienza University of Rome
- Organization(s): Pompeu Fabra University-Barcelona School of Management, University of Bergen (Norway)

Andrea Saltelli (born August 26, 1953, in Rome, Italy) is an Italian scholar specializing in quantification using statistical and sociological tools. He has extended the theory of sensitivity analysis to sensitivity auditing, focusing on physical chemistry, environmental statistics, impact assessment and science for policy. He is currently Counsellor at the UPF (Universitat Pompeu Fabra) ca:UPF Barcelona School of Management.

== Biography ==
Saltelli earned his degrees in inorganic chemistry from Sapienza University of Rome in the summer of 1976. He then worked at the Italian Nuclear Authority ENEA and, for one year, at the Argonne National Laboratory in the United States. From 1992 to 2015, he worked at the Joint Research Centre of the European Commission, leading a team dedicated to econometrics and applied statistics from 2005. Between 2016 and 2020, he held the position of associate professor at the Centre for the Study of the Sciences and the Humanities (Senter for vitenskapsteori) at the University of Bergen.

== Works ==
Andrea Saltelli has significantly contributed to the field of uncertainty and sensitivity analysis, founding the SAMO (Sensitivity Analysis of Model Output) international conference series in 1995. Saltelli has authored two handbooks on global sensitivity analysis, the most recent of which has been translated into Chinese. His works introduced the concepts of global sensitivity analysis and total sensitivity indices, helping to popularize the variance-based sensitivity analysis work of the Russian mathematician Ilya M. Sobol. His formulae for efficiently computing variance-based sensitivity indices have been widely adopted by many practitioners. Saltelli has applied his expertise to diverse fields, including climate change, ranking of higher education, ecological footprint, and composite indicators. His recent research focuses on the reproducibility of scientific results, principles for mathematical modelling, the ethics of quantification, and the politics of modelling.

Andrea Saltelli has collaborated with Silvio Funtowicz, Jerome R. Ravetz and Jeroen van der Sluijs on the theories and applications of post-normal science. He has also worked with the Belgian sociologist Paul-Marie Boulanger on the application of Niklas Luhmann's theories to the reproducibility crisis in scientific research and to the COVID-19 pandemic. Furthermore, Saltelli has collaborated with the Norwegian economist Erik Reinert on themes related to quantification in economics, and with Daniel Sarewitz on the post-truth debate.

== Sensitivity auditing ==
In an interview for 'The Corbet Report', Saltelli shared his early fascination with generating quantified evidence through statistical or mathematical modelling, highlighting his concern over how easy it is to produce poor-quality evidence, if not to manipulate data or deceive with numbers. This concern drove his engagement with issues in the fields of epistemology, philosophy of science, and science for policy surrounding the responsible production of data.

This same concern led him to extend the theory of sensitivity analysis to sensitivity auditing, which aims to assess the entire process of knowledge and model generation, including explicit or implicit assumptions, interests, stakes and motivations on part of the developers. According to existing guidelines including those from the European Commission, sensitivity auditing becomes particularly relevant when modelling results influence political decision-making processes.

== Books ==
- Saltelli, A., Chan, K., and Scott, M., Sensitivity Analysis. Chichester, UK: John Wiley & Sons, Ltd, 2000.
- Saltelli, A., Tarantola, S., Campolongo, F., and Ratto, M., Sensitivity Analysis in Practice. Chichester, UK: John Wiley & Sons, Ltd, 2004.
- Saltelli, A. et al., Global Sensitivity Analysis : The Primer. Chichester, UK: John Wiley & Sons, Ltd, 2008.
- Benessia, A., Funtowicz, S., Giampietro, M., Guimarães Pereira, A., Ravetz, J., Saltelli, A., Strand, R., and van der Sluijs, J., The Rightful Place of Science: Science on the Verge, Published by The Consortium for Science, Policy and Outcomes at Arizona State University, 2016.
- Saltelli, A., and Di Fiore, M., eds. The Politics of Modelling, Numbers Between Science and Policy. Oxford: Oxford University Press, 2023.

== Videos ==
- How to teach research integrity, Video curated by the Open University of Catalonia, November 2023.
- Ethics of quantification, Video curated by the Open University of Catalonia, September 2021.
- Webinar at Centre for Science and Technology Studies (CWTS), Leiden University, February 5, 2021: 'Ethics of quantification', with Andrea Saltelli, Wendy Espeland, & Andy Stirling.
- Regulatory capture in the name of Enlightenment, Post-normal science Symposium, September 25, 2020.
- Sensitivity analysis, an introduction, Closing keynote at the 2019 ENBIS conference in Budapest, September 4, 2019, Pázmány Péter sétány 1/C, Budapest.
- Interview with the Corbet Report, The Crisis of Science, March 6, 2019.
