= Evelyn Fox Keller =

American physicist, author and feminist (1936–2023)

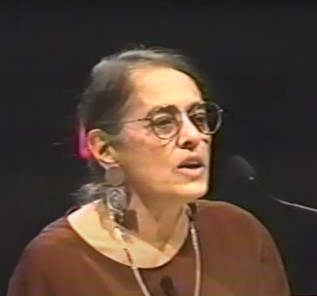
- Keller in 1999
- Born: March 20, 1936; New York City, U.S.
- Died: September 22, 2023 (aged 87); Cambridge, Massachusetts, U.S.
- Education: Brandeis University (B.A.); Radcliffe College (M.A.); Harvard University (Ph.D.)
- Awards: MacArthur Fellowship; Guggenheim Fellowship
- Scientific career
- Fields: Physics; Molecular Biology; History and Philosophy of Modern Biology; Gender and Science
- Thesis: "Photoinactivation and the Expression of Genetic Information in Bacteriophage-Lambda" (1963)

Evelyn Fox Keller (March 20, 1936 – September 22, 2023) was an American physicist, author, and feminist. She was Professor Emerita of History and Philosophy of Science at the Massachusetts Institute of Technology. Keller's early work concentrated at the intersection of physics and biology. Her subsequent research focused on the history and philosophy of modern biology and on gender and science.

== Biography ==
Born in Jackson Heights, Queens to Jewish immigrants from Russia, Keller grew up in Woodside, Queens. She received her B.A. in physics from Brandeis University in 1957 and continued her studies in theoretical physics at Harvard University graduating with a Ph.D. in 1963. She became interested in molecular biology during a visit to Cold Spring Harbor Laboratory while completing her Ph.D. dissertation. Keller has also taught at Northeastern University, Cornell University, University of Maryland, Northwestern University, Princeton University, State University of New York at Purchase, New York University and in the department of rhetoric at the University of California, Berkeley. Her early work in science was encouraged by her brother Maurice Sanford Fox.

In 2007 Keller sat on the USA advisory board of FFIPP (Faculty for Israeli-Palestinian Peace-USA), a network of Palestinian, Israeli, and International faculty, and students, working for an end of the Israeli occupation of Palestinian territories and just peace. When she won the Israeli Dan David Prize in 2018, she publicly donated the award to human rights organizations.

Evelyn Fox Keller died on September 22, 2023, in Cambridge, Massachusetts at the age of 87.

== Discussion of work ==
Keller first encountered feminism as a discipline while attending a conference entitled "Women and the Scientific Profession." At this conference, Erik Erikson and Bruno Bettelheim argued for more women in science based on the invaluable contributions a "specifically female genius" could make to science. Four years later, in 1969, she compiled an array of data on the experiences of women scientists and put together an argument about women in (or out of) science, based on "women's nature." She had been feeling disenchantment from her colleague publishing her team's work and she had not realized the reason behind it until she did her research.

In 1974 Keller taught her first women's studies course. Shortly after, she was invited to give a series of lectures on her work. She had never shared what it was like for her as a woman becoming a scientist and this lecture marked the beginning of her work as a feminist critic of science. It raised three central questions that marked her research and writing over the next decade.

One of her major works was a contribution to the book The Gender and Science Reader. Keller's article, entitled "Secrets of God, Nature, and Life", links issues in feminism back to the Scientific Revolution in the 17th century and the Industrial Revolution in the 18th century. She quotes Boyle: "It may seem an ingrateful and unfilial thing to dispute against nature, that is taken by mankind for the common parent of us all. But although it be as undutiful thing, to express a want of respect for an acknowledged parent, yet I know not, why it may not be allowable to question one, that a man looks upon but as a pretend one; and it appear to me, that she is so, I think it my duty to pay my gratitude, not to I know not what, but to that deity, whose wisdom and goodness...designed to make me a man" (pg. 103). By addressing Boyle's quote in this aspect, Keller suggests that as soon as questionable aspects are displayed in nature, "nature" becomes "nature" and is then feminine.

Keller documented how the masculine-identified public sphere and the feminine-identified private sphere have structured thinking in two areas of evolutionary biology: population genetics and mathematical ecology. Her concern is to show how the selection process that occurs in the context of discovery limits what we come to know. Keller argues that the assumption that the atomistic individual is the fundamental unit in nature has led population geneticists to omit sexual reproduction from their models. Though the critique of misplaced individualism is nothing new, the gender dynamics Keller reveals are. According to Keller, geneticists treat reproduction as if individuals reproduce themselves, effectively bypassing the complexities of sexual difference, the contingencies of mating, and fertilization. She likens the biologists' atomistic individual to heuristic individual portrayed by mainstream Western political and economic theorists. Keller argues further that biologists use values ascribed to the public sphere of Western culture to depict relations between individuals (while values generally attributed to the private sphere to describe relations are confused to the interior of an individual organism).

According to Yale sociologist Rene Almeling, Keller "is part of a generation of scholars who so thoroughly established 'gender and science' as a legitimate subject of inquiry that it made possible decades and decades of subsequent research among historians, philosophers, and social scientists." According to The Bloomsbury Encyclopedia of Philosophers in America, her later work addressed the role of language in mediating relations between science and society more generally, including "an unusually scientifically acute and philosophically sophisticated set of case studies in the history of science, particularly of biological sciences in the twentieth century.

In her work entitled Making Sense of Life: Explaining Biological Development with Models, Metaphors, and Machines Keller discusses the relation between "understanding", "computability" and "predictability", reflecting on the role of mathematical and computational models. Distancing herself from the works of Morrison and Morgan that describe models as mediators between theory and practice, Keller notes that in mathematical biology models can be simultaneously "guides for doing as much as for thinking." For her, the question of "what count as a scientific explanation" cannot be answered in the singular; the "multiplicity of explanatory styles in scientific practice" suggests recourse to an "explanatory pluralism" that Keller reconnects to the theses on the disunity of science of John Dupré and Nancy Cartwright.

Keller's studies of the interplay between scientific theory, on the one hand, and the linguistic, technological, psychological, political, and other "external" factors that play a role in shaping it, are among the subtlest and most insightful in the literature. She usually conducts these inquiries through discussion of particular episodes or trajectories in the history of science. History thus becomes her philosophical laboratory."

== Criticism ==
Some scholars who study women in science have criticized the version of gender and science theory that was pioneered by Keller. Ann Hibner Koblitz has argued that Keller's theory fails to account for the great variation among different cultures and time periods. For example, the first generation of women to receive advanced university degrees in Europe were almost entirely in the natural sciences and medicine—in part because those fields at the time were much more welcoming of women than were the humanities. Koblitz and others who are interested in increasing the number of women in science have expressed concern that some of Keller's statements could undermine those efforts, notably the following:

Just as surely as inauthenticity is the cost a woman suffers by joining men in misogynist jokes, so it is, equally, the cost suffered by a woman who identifies with an image of the scientist modeled on the patriarchal husband. Only if she undergoes a radical disidentification from self can she share masculine pleasure in mastering a nature cast in the image of woman as passive, inert, and blind.

Among the critics of Keller's gender and science theory are the mathematical physicist Mary Beth Ruskai, the former presidents of the Association for Women in Mathematics Lenore Blum and Mary Gray, and gender researchers Pnina Abir-Am and Dorinda Outram.

These debates raise the broader question of the distinction between the analysis of women in science as a profession vs. gender and scientific theory.

== Published works ==
- 1983 A Feeling for the Organism: The Life and Work of Barbara McClintock. Freeman ISBN 0-805-07458-9
- 1985 Reflections on Gender and Science. Yale University Press ISBN 0-300-06595-7
- 1989 Three Cultures: Fifteen Lectures on the Confrontation of Academic Cultures. The Hague : Univ. Pers Rotterdam
- 1990 Conflicts in Feminism. (co-edited with Marianne Hirsch) Routledge ISBN 0415901774
- 1990 Body/Politics: Women and the Discourses of Science. (co-edited with Mary Jacobus and Sally Shuttleworth) Routledge (reprinted 2013 ISBN 1134976089)
- 1992 Secrets of Life/Secrets of Death: Essays on Language, Gender and Science. Routledge
- 1995 Refiguring Life: Metaphors of Twentieth-century Biology. The Wellek Library Lecture Series at the University of California, Irvine. Columbia University Press ISBN 0-231-10205-4
- 1996 Feminism and Science. (co-edited with Helen Longine) Oxford Readings in Feminism ISBN 978-0-19-875146-5
- 1998 Keywords in Evolutionary Biology (co-edited with Elisabeth Lloyd). Harvard University Press (reprinted 1998 ISBN 0-674-50313-9).
- 2000 The Century of the Gene. Harvard University Press ISBN 0-674-00825-1
- 2002 Making Sense of Life: Explaining Biological Development with Models, Metaphors, and Machines. Harvard University Press ISBN 0-674-01250-X
- 2010 The Mirage of a Space between Nature and Nurture. Duke University Press ISBN 0-822-34731-8
- 2017 Cultures without Culturalism: The Making of Scientific Knowledge (co-edited with Karine Chemla) Duke University Press ISBN 978-0-8223-6372-9
- 2017 The Seasons Alter: How to Save Our Planet in Six Acts. (co-authored with Philip Kitcher). Norton. ISBN 978-1-63149-412-3
- 2023 Making Sense of My Life in Science: A Memoir. Modern Memoirs, Inc. ISBN 978-0-99977-058-0

== Awards and honors ==
- 1986 Distinguished Publication Award, from the Association for Women in Psychology
- 1987-1988 Member, Institute for Advanced Study
- 1991 Mount Holyoke College, Commencement Speaker and Honorary Degree Recipient (Doctor of Humane Letters)
- 1992 MacArthur Fellowship – also called the Genius Grant
- 1993 University of Amsterdam, Honorary Doctorate Recipient
- 1996 Luleå University of Technology, Honorary Degree Recipient (Doctor of Technology)
- 2000 Guggenheim Fellowship
- 2001 Wesleyan University, Commencement Speaker and Honorary Doctorate Recipient
- 2004–2005 Radcliffe Institute Fellow
- 2005 Appointed to the Blaise Pascal Research Chair by the Préfecture de la Région D'Ile-de-France
- 2006 Elected Member of the American Philosophical Society
- 2007 Elected Fellow of the American Academy of Arts and Sciences
- 2008 Dartmouth 2008 Honorary Degree Recipient (Doctor of Science)
- 2011 Science Hall of Fame
- 2011 John Desmond Bernal Prize from the Society for Social Study of Science
- 2018 Dan David Prize
