= John Beatty (philosopher) =

Canadian philosopher (born 1951)

- Born: John Henry Beatty; 1951 (age 74–75); Midland, Texas, US
- Known for: Philosophy of biology

Academic background
- Education: Tulane University (BA 1973); Indiana University Bloomington (MA 1977; PhD 1979)
- Website: philosophy.ubc.ca/profile/john-beatty/

John Henry Beatty (born 1951) is a Canadian and American philosopher of science in the Department of Philosophy at the University of British Columbia in Vancouver, British Columbia. His research focuses on the theoretical foundations, methodology, and socio-political dimensions of genetics and evolutionary biology. He is well known in the philosophy of biology community.

== Early life and education ==
John Henry Beatty was born in 1951 in Midland, Texas. He earned a BA from Tulane University in biology and chemistry in 1973, then an MA and a PhD in the history and philosophy of science from Indiana University Bloomington in 1977 and 1979, respectively.

== Career ==
Beatty began his career as an associate professor in the Department of the History of Science at Harvard University 1978–1982 before moving to the Department of Philosophy at Arizona State University 1982–1984 and then the Departments of Ecology, Evolution, and Behavior and History of Science and Technology at the University of Minnesota 1985–2003. In 2003, he moved to his current position in the Department of Philosophy at the University of British Columbia.

He was a visiting fellow in residence at the Center for Interdisciplinary Research, Bielefeld 1982–1983, where he participated in a project in the history of probability on whether there was a "probabilistic revolution" in the history of modern science. This made him a co-author of The Empire of Chance (1989) with Gerd Gigerenzer, Zeno Swijtink, Theodore Porter, Lorraine Daston, and Lorenz Krüger.

Since 1990, he has been a co-director of the Marine Biological Laboratory History of Biology seminar series begun by Garland E. Allen and Jane Maienschein.

He was elected to become a fellow of the American Association for the Advancement of Science in 1997.
