= The World in the Model: How Economists Work and Think =

2012 non fiction book

- Editors: Mary S. Morgan
- Language: English
- Subjects: History of economics Economics; Philosophy of science Sociology of quantification History of science
- Publisher: Cambridge University Press
- Publication date: 2012
- Pages: 442
- ISBN: 9781139560412

The World in the Model: How Economists Work and Think is a work by Mary S. Morgan published by Cambridge University Press in 2012.

== Content ==
Mary S. Morgan, defined by Robert Sugden "a major philosopher and historian of economics", analyzes with examples how economists work and think using models. Her book reconstructs the path taken by models to become economists' "natural way of doing economics."

For Morgan, both the "method of mathematical postulation and proof" and that of modelling have emerged in late 19th century, and models have become economists' main tools only from the 1930s, replacing classical economics relying on "universal laws".

A concept stressed throughout this work is that:

Economic modelling is not primarily a method of proof, but rather a method of inquiry.

The pragmatic orientation of her work is stated right at the beginning, noting that "Science is messy", thus

Asking: What qualities do models need to make them useful in a science? and What functions do models play in a science? are more fruitful than asking What are models?

According to Morgan, who draws a parallel with physics, economists follow four general steps in their work with models:

- Step 1: Create a model the is relevant to the problem at hand
- Step 2: Interrogate the model
- Step 3: Demonstrate the answer to a question using the internal resources and dynamics of the model
- Step 4: Build a narrative that links the answers offered by the model to the external world

For the Author, economists

... reason about the small world in the model and reason about the big economic world with the model.

The existence of a world inside the model itself is a central feature of the work. Modelling is not just an activity of abstraction, simplification, idealization, and mathematization, but entails the creation of new artifacts to be explored and reasoned with, in a play where the economist and the model are "jointly active participants".

As noted by Sugden, Morgan repeats at several points this double function of models:

Models are objects to enquire into and to enquire with: economists enquire into the world of the economic model, and use them to enquire with into the economic world that the model represents

The case studies span a period going from early nineteenth century to the second half of the twentieth century, though the earlier Quesnay's Tableau économiques are mentioned among the antecedents of modelling (Chapter 1). Models start thus with Ricardo's "model farm" (Chapter 2), to study for example how an increase in grain prices would affect rents, to continue with the Edgeworth box for the trading of goods, later the subject of developments by Vilfredo Pareto (Chapter 3), with the rational agent (Chapter 4), and with Newlyn–Phillips hydraulic machine of the economy (Chapter 5). The book continues with the business cycle work of Ragnar Frisch and Jan Tinbergen (this latter father of Econometrics), and the macroeconomic models of Meade, Samuelson and Hicks (Chapter 6), with supply and demand models (Chapter 7), all the way to modern simulation modelling (Chapter 8). Monte Carlo methods are included, and a full chapter (Chapter 9) is devoted to the Prisoner Dilemma, where the Author discusses Nash equilibrium using both the classical example of the two prisoners confronted with the choice to either confess or stay silent while ignoring their companion's choice, and a less seen example drawn from Puccini's Tosca, with illustrations from a paper of Anatol Rapoport.

As noted by economist Gene Callahan Morgan is attentive to the specialized talents that are needed in economic modelling, including a tacit, craft-based, knowledge that can only be acquired via apprenticeship.

In discussing what makes a model "fruitful" Morgan notes that while they must have enough internal resources to operate, including some salient aspects of "the economic world," they need to be able to generate variety in their outcome, as to potentially surprise the analyst, even when the surprise is that too many solutions are possible, as noted by Paul Samuelson when trying to translate Keynes's General Theory of Employment, Interest and Money into a model. Also, size in relation to content matters, so that models must also be small enough to be manipulable.

Morgan aims to provide an account of "modelling (in economics) as an autonomous epistemic genre". In this, the use of narratives in relation to models is not just rhetorical; it is foremost epistemological. Ragnar Frisch's image of the business cycle as a rocking horse randomly hit by a boy with a club successfully conveyed to the economist of the 1930's the concept of an harmonic process impulsed by shocks. The centrality of narration for models in the work of Morgan is noted by François Claveau and Gene Callahan. This latter notes how this is well illustrated by the prisoner dilemma, that would be incomprehensible if offered only in terms of payoffs, without the accompanying story.

Chapter 7 offers a discussion of what makes models different from physical experiments. Morgan sees a difference in that experiments are "made of the same stuff" of the world, while in the case of models "there is no shared stuff".

Coming to how economic models influence policy thanks to their scientific authority, Morgan, citing Nancy Cartwright, offers a word of caution:

the looseness of the criteria of plausibility always make it doubtful, difficult, and potentially dangerous, to use these little mathematical models to intervene directly in the economic world.

== Reception ==
The book is praised by Verena Halsmayer and by Maxime Desmarais-Tremblay for showing the variety of tools mobilized by economists, such as the hydraulic system of the Newlyn–Philips Machine made of pipes, valves and tanks, graphs such as those of the Edgeworth box, pen and paper tabulated records such as Ricardo's ideal farm, conceptual games such as the Prisoner dilemma, and modern day equations.

For François Claveau it is disappointing that Morgan, though author of The History of Econometric Ideas (1990) does not discuss econometric models, nor the distinction between these, embedded into real world data and statistical testing, and non-econometric models. Claveau also laments the absence of a discussion of the difference between theories and models.

A limit of Morgan's work that is flagged by Verena Halsmayer is that in examining a selected set of successful models the book discounts alternative traditions, the "verbal economics" and other historical traditions, evading the strategic development leading to the dominance of (neoclassical) economic modeling, thus ignoring "what was lost by adopting modeling as the dominant mode of economic knowledge production".

Robert Sugden praises Morgan's vivid portrait of Ricardo. Morgan details how the numerical examples of his model farm were inspired by agricultural experiments run by other gentleman farmers. The same reviewer notes that the book of Morgan, as the tile implies, has more to say about how economist work inside the model than in how they look at the world outside it. As a modeller, Sugden suggests that Morgan's emphasis on how economists manipulate their models to obtain insights may discount models' autonomy, and in what way models may speak with their own voice.

For this work Morgan won in 2013 the best book award from The European Society for the History of Economic Thought.
