= Peter Menzies =

Peter Menzies may refer to:

- Peter Menzies (philosopher) (1953–2015), Australian philosopher
- Peter Menzies Jr., Australian cinematographer
