= Peter Weingart =

German sociologist

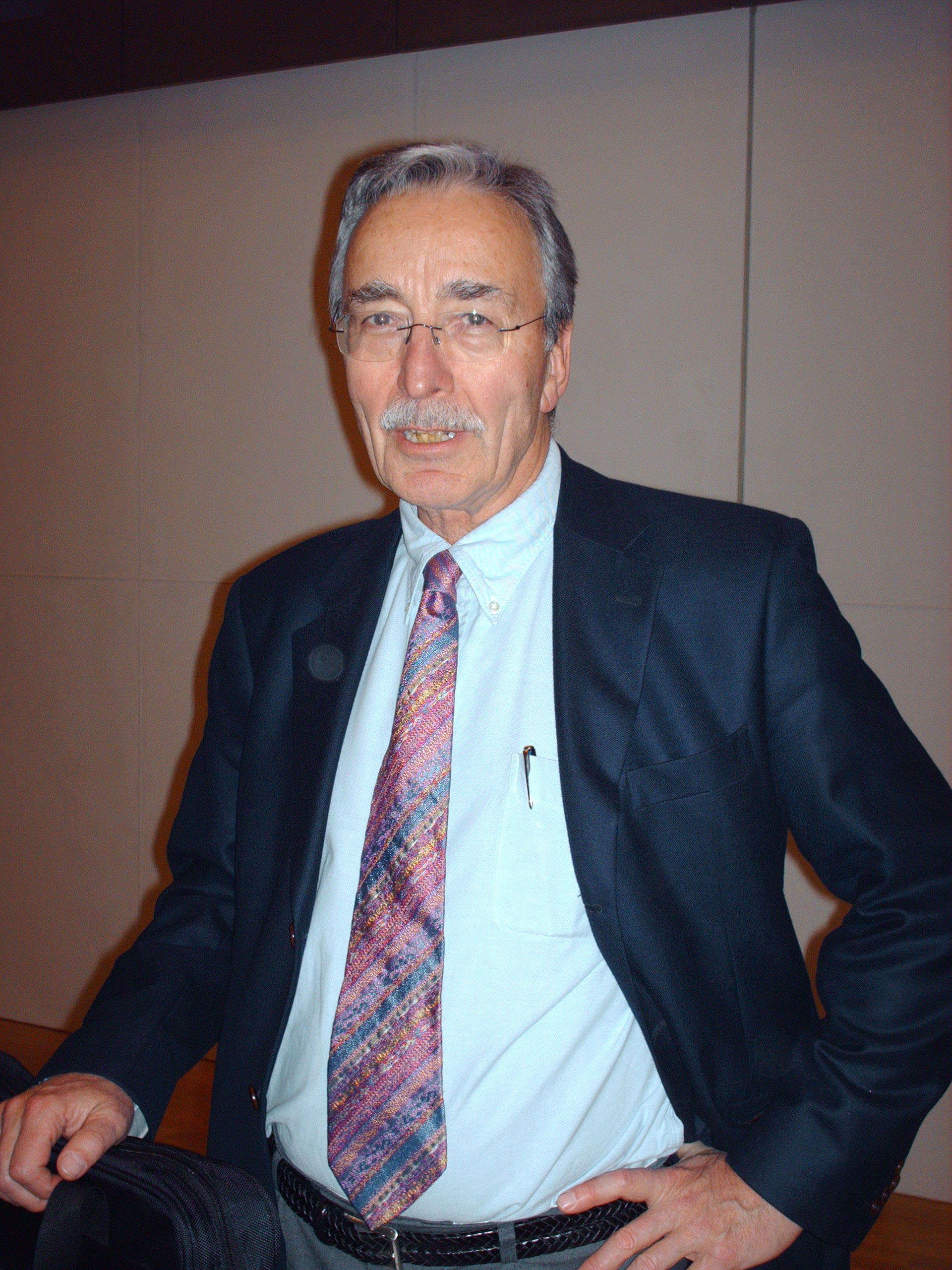
- Born: 5 June 1941 (age 85); Marburg, Germany
- Education: Free University Berlin
- Scientific career
- Fields: Sociology, science and technology studies, social theory
- Workplaces: Bielefeld University, Free University Berlin, Princeton University
- Thesis: Die amerikanische Wissenschaftslobby, Zum sozialen und politischen Wandel des Wissenschaftssystems im Prozeß der Forschungsplanung. (1970)
- Doctoral advisor: Otto Stammer
- Website: nottingham.academia.edu/ReinerGrundmann

Peter Weingart (born 5 June 1941 in Marburg) is a German professor emeritus in sociology and former director of the Center for Interdisciplinary Research, Bielefeld.

== Life and academic career ==
Peter Weingart studied sociology and economics from 1961 until 1967 at Albert-Ludwigs-Universität Freiburg and Freie Universität Berlin. Till 1968, he was University Fellow at Princeton University in New Jersey and received a doctorate 1969 at the Freie Universität Berlin. The thesis was about the American scientific lobby in the process of research planning.

Weingart had various assignments with the Berlin University and was science expert for the German unions economic institute in Düsseldorf and directed the center of Science research at Bielefeld University. 1973 he received a tenure in Bielefeld. In the mid-1980s, he received various fellowships at Wissenschaftskolleg zu Berlin and Harvard University. In the Spring of 2003, Weingart was a Fellow at the Swedish Collegium for Advanced Study in Uppsala, Sweden. From 1989 until 2009 he was again in Bielefeld. Since 2015 Weingart has held the South African Research Chair in Science communication at Stellenbosch University.

Weingart is member of Berlin-Brandenburgische Akademie der Wissenschaften and Hanse-Wissenschaftskolleg, the Hanseatic League Institute for Advanced Study. He was among the editors of Scientometrics, and International Journal of Sociology and Social Policy. and publisher of Yearbook Sociology of the Sciences and advisor for Suhrkamp Verlag. He is the current editor-in-chief of Minerva.

== Positions and interests ==
Weingart started early to examine the production of knowledge and its interaction with politics and the media. His book Wissen Beraten Entscheiden (know, advise, decide) described forms of science advice to politics in Germany. He wrote as well a book about the science base for the German eugenics studies and their interaction with Racial hygiene policy.

For the present, Weingart states a higher importance of PR agencies intermediating between science and public and saw a trend of a more 'public science' within a postindustrial information society. The media's role as the fourth estate increases and influences science findings already in its production state. It may be attractive for some scientists to use their celebrity status in the media as means of gaining acceptance for their findings or for their preferred fields of study. Such celebrity bonuses however weaken peer review controlling mechanisms. Weingart saw the hype about of Daniel Goldhagen's books in Germany as such an example.

Weingart also took the climate change debate as an example where the public announcement of findings may backfire. The public debate about climate change in Germany was at its height around 1986, when the energy committee of the Deutsche Physikalische Gesellschaft (AKE) predicted a climate catastrophe rendering earth a dead planet within 50 years. The scientists asked in parallel to increase nuclear power stations to reduce CO_{2} emissions. When meteorologists started to criticize the alarmist tone, the AKE toned down its conclusions to climate change instead of climate disaster. However the public scene kept using the alarmist conclusions first and later on doubted scientists overall credibility on the topic.

Weingart prefers science communication to provide proof of uncertainties and ignorance combined with established facts. The basic aspects of "Verwissenschaftlichung der Gesellschaft – Politisierung der Wissenschaft" (a scientification of society and politicization of science) go hand in hand.

== Selected papers ==
- Susanne Koch, Peter Weingart, The Delusion of Knowledge Transfer: The Impact of Foreign Aid Experts on Policy-making in South Africa and Tanzania, African Minds, Cape Town 2016, ISBN 978-1-928331-39-1
- Peter Weingart, Was ist gesellschaftlich relevante Wissenschaft?, in Keine Wissenschaft für sich: Essays zur gesellschaftlichen Relevanz von Forschung, Annette Schavan (Hrsg.), edition Bergedorf Round Table, 2008, ISBN 978-3-89684-124-7
- Peter Weingart, Justus Lentsch, Wissen Beraten Entscheiden. Form und Funktion wissenschaftlicher Politikberatung in Deutschland. Weiterswist 2008. ISBN 3-938808-51-9
- Peter Weingart, Niels C. Taubert (Hg.), Das Wissensministerium. Ein halbes Jahrhundert Forschungs- und Bildungspolitik in Deutschland. Weilerswist 2006. ISBN 3-938808-18-7
- Mark B. Brown, Justus Lentsch, Peter Weingart (Hg.), Politikberatung und Parlament, Opladen 2006, ISBN 3-938094-00-1
- Peter Weingart, Die Wissenschaft der Öffentlichkeit. Essays zum Verhältnis von Wissenschaft, Medien und Öffentlichkeit, Weilerswist 2005, ISBN 3-934730-03-5
- Peter Weingart, Wissenschaftssoziologie, Bielefeld 2003, ISBN 3-933127-37-8
- Peter Weingart, Anita Engels, Petra Pansegrau, Von der Hypothese zur Katastrophe – Der anthropogene Klimawandel im Diskurs zwischen Wissenschaft, Politik und Massenmedien, Leske + Budrich 2002, ISBN 3-8100-3449-5
- Peter Weingart, Die Stunde der Wahrheit? Zum Verhältnis der Wissenschaft zu Politik, Wirtschaft und Medien in der Wissensgesellschaft, Weilerswist 2001, ISBN 3-934730-29-9
- Peter Weingart, Jürgen Kroll, Kurt Bayertz: Rasse, Blut und Gene. Geschichte der Eugenik und Rassenhygiene in Deutschland. 3. Auflage. Frankfurt am Main 2001, ISBN 3-518-28622-6
- Peter Weingart (Hg.), Grenzüberschreitungen in der Wissenschaft = Crossing boundaries in science, Baden-Baden 1995, ISBN 3-7890-4009-6
