= Relton =

Relton is a name that may refer to:

- Caroline Relton, British biochemist
- Relton Roberts (born 1986), Australian rules footballer
