= Data politics =

Politics encompassing various aspects of data

Data politics encompasses the political aspects of data including topics ranging from data activism, open data and open government. The ways in which data is collected, accessed, and what we do with that data has changed in contemporary society due to a number of factors surrounding issues of politics. An issue that arises from political data is often how disconnected people are from their own data, rarely gaining access to the data they produce. Large platforms like Google have a "better to ask forgiveness than permission" stance on data collection to which the greater population is largely ignorant, leading to movements within data activism.

== History ==
Data collection has had a long history, but the way humans are involved in its collection has grown exponentially in the years since the dot-com boom of the 1990s and the market crash in 2008. The primary goal of platforms like Google, Facebook, and Amazon is data collection through the applications and services they provide to consumers, such as wearable technology like FitBit and Apple Watch, as well as home devices like Google Nest and Amazon Alexa. The purpose of these devices becomes more clear when consumers understand the immense amounts of data that are being exhausted and sold to advertisers and data brokers Some scholars note the resemblance of platforms to sovereign states with their power and populations, as well as their surveillance capabilities. More recently, data collection has been seen as a trade off, privacy is disregarded and in return, consumers gain access to convenient applications and devices to stay connected.

== Open government data ==
The principles behind open government data are data that are free to use without restrictions, available for reuse, unlicensed and non-discriminatory Other academics feel open government data should be focused on servicing citizens needs, rather than just providing them with raw data. This process would require training individuals to analyze data while also including them in the management and planning of data. Having access to government schedules does little for public engagement, but creating plans surrounding public issues, such as health and wellness, and making that data available may have positive impact on citizens lives. This type of practice has been called open innovation, which focuses on the collaborative aspects of open government. Speaking to the idea of open innovation, it has been said that although there should be no restriction on data availability, the focus on data for public policy and commercial use should be most important such as economic and transportation data.

=== Open data initiatives ===
In 2011 the Open Government Partnership was created requiring governments globally to adhere to standards relating to open government, including transparency, anti-corruption and promote technological innovation, and has been adopted by 72 countries, with more considered as eligible partners. Other efforts include the Global Open Data Index (GODI), a crowdsourced index that scores and evaluates the openness of government data from a civic perspective. GODI tries to answer the question of how government's publish data and thus far does not assess the quality of data published.

== Data activism ==
The mass scale of data collection has created an asymmetrical power dynamic between state and citizens, some scholars say. Data politics is similar but different from data activism, focusing on civic data and making the government process of outputting data better. There are multiple levels to data politics although two standout at the grassroots level, the protest of mass data collection and engagement with data.

On a wider scale, the two approaches to data activism and data politics are called reactive, where large scale data collection threatens the freedoms and privacy of a society, and proactive, where open data and open government can illicit greater societal change, proactive activists are advocates of both open data and government and question the reality we live in.

Data Politics shares traits of each approach in that the core values of data politics are open government data, but data politics also concerns data collection by governments, private corporations, and platforms. An example of proactive data politics was the protest of the elimination of the long form census. In Canada there are efforts like datalibre.ca, who advocate for the restoration of the long form census by creating a database of Canadian institutions that support and are against the cancellation of the census. This blog is proactive in its belief that publicly funded data should be open and free of charge to be used for positive social change

CryptoParties are an example of reactive data politics, which are global events where people share knowledge about how to browse the Internet securely. This is considered re-active because the people involved are working towards data justice.

== See also ==
- Data activism
- Open government
- Politics
- Open data
