= Data activism =

Form of activism

Data activism is a form of activism that uses data and data analysis to generate evidence and visualizations with the aim of revealing injustices, improving people's lives and promoting social change. It emerged from living in a time of data abundance, and the varieties of new technologies we possess; such as aerial sensors, ubiquitous mobile devices, and radio-frequency identification readers. With these new technologies, we have entered a new phase in human history called the "industrial revolution of data".

Data activism uses the production and collection of digital, volunteered, and open data to challenge existing power relations. Although this is a form of activism, it is not to be confused with the term slacktivism, meaning a low-effort method of using the internet to support political or social issues. Forms of data activism can include digital humanitarianism and engaging in hackathons, which is an event in which software developers are working at an accelerated pace. Data activism is a social practice that is becoming more well known with the expansion of technology, open-sourced software and the ability to communicate beyond an individual's immediate community.

A defining characteristic of data activism is that ordinary citizens can participate, in comparison to previous forms of media activism where elite skill sets were required to participate. It gives power back to civilians, as they can leverage data activism in two ways: proactive data activism and reactive data activism. By increasingly involving everyday users, data activism reflects a shift in how civil society perceives and responds to large-scale data collection.

Data activism can be the act of providing data on events or issues that individuals feel have not been properly addressed by those in power. For example, the first deployment of the Ushahidi platform in 2008 in Kenya visualized the post-electoral violence that had been silenced by the government and the new media. The social practice of data activism revolves around the idea that data is political in nature. By collecting data for a particular purpose, it allows data activists to quantify and expose specific issues using statistical evidence.

== Types ==
A twofold classification of data activism has been proposed by Stefania Milan and Miren Gutiérrez, later explored more in-depth by Milan according to the type of activists' engagement with data politics. 'Re-active data activism' can be characterized as motivated by the perception of massive data collection as a threat, for instance when activists seek to resist corporate and government snooping, whereas 'pro-active data activism' sees the increasing availability of data as an opportunity to foster social change. These differentiated approaches to using data result in different repertoires of action. These two types of data activism are not at odds with one another, since they share a crucial feature: they take information as a constitutive force capable of shaping social reality and contribute to generate new alternative ways of interpreting it.

Examples of re-active data activism include the development and usage of encryption and anonymity networks to resist corporate or state surveillance, while instances of pro-active data activism include projects in which data is mobilized to advocate for change and contest established social narrative.

== Examples ==
=== End the Backlog ===
It was discovered that in the United States between 180,000 and 500,000 rape kits were left unprocessed in storage in forensic warehouses. Registration and entry of criminal DNA had been inconsistent, which caused this large backlog in date rape kits. The delay in analyzing these DNA samples would approximately be six months to two years. The information from rape kits was meant to be entered into the forensic warehouse database, but there was a disconnect between the warehouse system and the national DNA database Combined DNA Index System (CODIS) that left these rape kits unexamined.

Testing these rape kits is important in identifying and prosecuting offenders, recognizing serial rapists, and providing justice for rape victims. The Ending the Backlog Initiative used data activism to bring attention to this issue, demanding that the data from these rape kits be processed. It was this initiative got the attention of the United States government, who stated that this was unacceptable and put $79 million in grants toward helping eliminate the backlog of rape kits. The quantification of this data changed the way in which the public perceived the process of analyzing rape kits. This data was then used to gain the attention of politicians and decision-makers.

=== DataKind ===
DataKind is a digital activism organization that brings together data scientists, other activists, and members of governments for the purpose of using big data in similar ways that corporations currently do, namely to monetize data. However, here big data is used to help solve social problems, like food shortages and homelessness. DataKind was founded in 2011 and today there are chapters in the United Kingdom, India, Singapore and the United States of America. Jake Porway is the founder and executive director of DataKind.

== Criticism ==
While data activists may have good intentions, one criticism is that by allowing citizens to generate data without training or reliable forms of measurement, the data can be skewed or presented in different forms. Additionally, unexperienced people analyzing data may misinterpret secondary data or charts which can lead to falsifying or misleading information.

=== Safecast ===
After the Fukushima nuclear disaster in 2011, Safecast was an organization established by a group of citizens that were concerned about high levels of radiation in the area. After receiving conflicting messages about levels of radiation from different media sources and scientists, individuals were uncertain which information was the most reliable. This brought about a movement where citizens would use Geiger counter readings to measure levels of radiation and circulate that data over the internet so that it was accessible by the public. Safecast was developed as a means of producing multiple sources of data on radiation for public usage. It was assumed that if the data was collected by similar Geiger counter measurements in mass volume, the data produced was likely to be accurate. Safecast allows individuals to download the raw radiation data, but Safecast also visualizes the data. The data that is used to create a visual map is processed, monitored, and categorized by Safecast. This data is different from the raw radiation data because it has been filtered. The change in presentation of data may alter the information that individuals take from it, which can pose a threat if misunderstood.

== See also ==
- Information activism
- Media Activism
- Statactivism
- Slacktivism
