= Luc Bovens =

Belgian philosopher

Luc Bovens is a Belgian professor of philosophy at the University of North Carolina at Chapel Hill. Bovens is a former editor of Economics and Philosophy. His main areas of research are moral and political philosophy, philosophy of economics, philosophy of public policy, Bayesian epistemology, rational choice theory, and voting theory. He has also published work, of some controversy to the anti-abortion movement, on issues regarding abortion and natural family planning methods of contraception.

== Biography ==
Bovens attended the Katholieke Universiteit Leuven in Belgium, studying Social Sciences, before moving to the University of Minnesota, Minneapolis. Here he completed an MA in sociology, an MA in philosophy and a PhD in philosophy in 1990.

He was a research assistant in the National Fund for Scientific Research in Belgium, before gaining a professorship in the department of philosophy at the University of Colorado at Boulder in 1990.

Bovens was Director of the Philosophy, Probability and Modeling (PPM) research group with Stephan Hartmann at the University of Konstanz, Germany, from 2002 to 2005, and an editor of Economics and Philosophy from 2002 to 2007.

He was a professor in and the head of the department of Philosophy, Logic and Scientific Method at the London School of Economics 2004 through 2017. In the Fall of 2011, he was a Fellow at the Swedish Collegium for Advanced Study. In 2018 Bovens joined the Philosophy Department at the University of North Carolina at Chapel Hill as a professor, and core member of the Philosophy, Politics & Economics (PPE) Program.

== Select bibliography ==
=== Books ===
- Bayesian Epistemology, Oxford: Oxford University Press, 2003 (with Stephan Hartmann)
- Nancy Cartwright’s Philosophy of Science, Routledge, 2007 (edited with Stephan Hartmann and Carl Hoefer)

=== Articles ===
- "The Rhythm Method and Embryonic Death", Journal of Medical Ethics, 32 (2006), pp. 355–56.

Article reviewed in The New York Times, June 13, 2006.
