= The Mirage of a Space Between Nature and Nurture =

2010 book about the nature-nurture debate

- First edition
- Author: Evelyn Fox Keller
- Language: English
- Subject: Nature–nurture debate
- Publisher: Duke University Press
- Publication date: June 2010
- Pages: 107
- ISBN: 978-0-8223-4731-6

The Mirage of a Space Between Nature and Nurture is a book by Evelyn Fox Keller, an American historian of science, about the nature–nurture debate. It was first published in June 2010 by Duke University Press. The book is unusually short, as it is a mere 107 pages long. Furthermore, just 84 of these pages represent the actual text of the book, as opposed to its notes, index, or bibliography.

== Reviews ==
David Moore reviewed The Mirage of a Space Between Nature and Nurture favorably in the journal Science & Education. He concluded, "For its careful analysis of the causes of the confusion that continues to keep the nature/nurture debate alive long after it has become clear that the questions motivating the debate have been ill-formed, Fox Keller’s book can be highly recommended for classroom teachers or teacher educators." Nadine Weidman of Harvard University praised the book as "concise and clearly written", concluding that it "...should be required reading for all those scientists, popularizers, and reporters whose claims for genetic causation of traits commit the very errors that [Keller's] analysis so skillfully elucidates." Similarly, John P. Jackson, Jr. of the University of Colorado Boulder commended the book for shedding light on linguistic misunderstandings that pervade many discussions on human genetics. David Depew concluded his review of Keller's book by referring to it as "a very helpful book" for emphasizing that DNA is only one of many developmental resources involved in the production of phenotypes. Other scholars who reviewed Mirage favorably include Michael Ruse, Lorraine Daston, and Richard Lewontin. Philosopher Neven Sesardic wrote a less favorable review of Mirage, describing the book as "frustrating". He concluded that "...scientists...will probably find [the book] unhelpful, or even off-putting, that most of the issues they might be interested in are addressed here too quickly, offhandedly, in the unnecessarily abstract or vague terms, and without connecting them with the relevant empirical research."
