= The Measure of Reality =

1997 non-fiction book by Alfred W. Crosby

The Measure of Reality: Quantification in Western Europe, 1250-1600
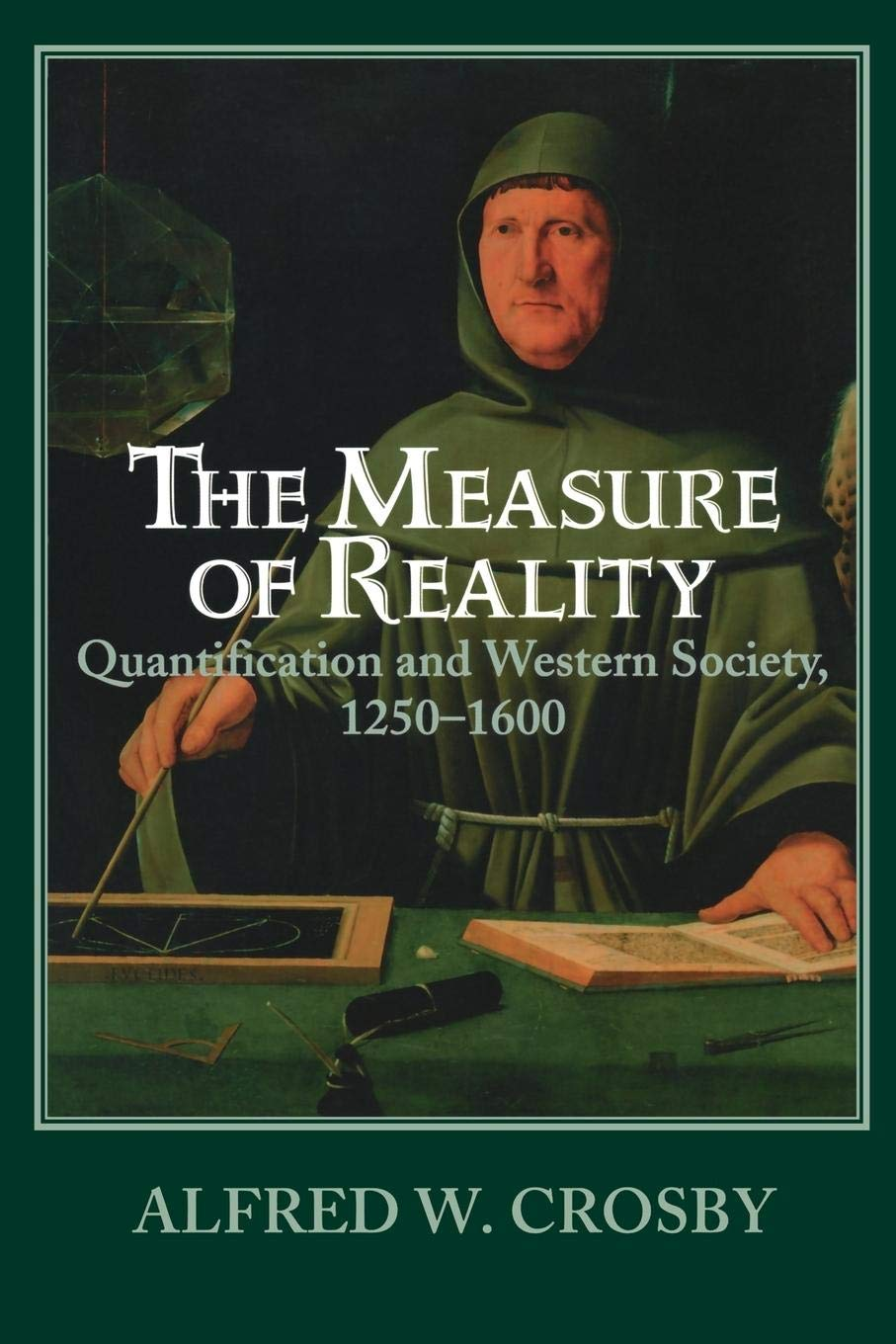
- Author: Alfred W. Crosby
- Language: English
- Subjects: Historiography
- Publisher: Cambridge University Press
- Publication date: 1997
- Pages: 262
- ISBN: 978-0-521-55427-5

The Measure of Reality: Quantification in Western Europe, 1250-1600 is a 1997 nonfiction historiography and macrohistory book by Alfred W. Crosby, about the role of quantification in Western civilization. It is published by Cambridge University Press.

== Content ==
The Measure of Reality examines the origins and effects of quantitative thinking in post-medieval European history', suggesting it as a major factor in the ensuing European colonial domination of much of the rest of the world. For Crosby, this was made possible by a shift in mindset and worldview that the author collectively calls mentalité (Bourdieu's habitus comes to mind) toward quantitative and visual thinking fostering a superior understanding of science and technology.

To illustrate how Crosby describes the shift away from a qualitative and theological view of reality, philosopher Denis Dutton offers the example of geography:

Geography was qualitative, holding that the peoples of the Indies, governed by slow-moving Saturn, were slow moving. Europeans, on the other hand, lived in the land of the seventh climate, that of the moon, which revolves around the earth faster than any other body. Therefore, Europeans are the most active people. Maps were designed not geometrically, but to show what was near and far, what was important, what unimportant. Their representation of geographic reality was, as Crosby says, "for sinners, not navigators."

For James D. Parr Crosby

[...] describes with interesting narrative and ample references European triumphs in military maneuvering, cartography, calendar accuracy, time-keeping devices, currency and bookkeeping, polyphonic music, rules of grammar and alphabetization, astronomy, and geometric perspective in painting.

The book is divided into three sections, where the first introduces a new view of time and space as a continuum that could be subdivided and segmented, assisted by the application of the Hindu–Arabic numeral system. The second part follows the evolution of quantification in music, painting, and bookkeeping. The third part presents the maturation of what Crosby describes as the new model of European reality, established on visualization and quantification as well as a linear and analytical but unbounded view of history driven by "progress", versus what he terms the venerable model, a more qualitative, experiential, and boundedly cyclical worldview inherited from classical antiquity.

Crosby adopts the metaphor of the striking match to illustrate how this revolution took place, with the influx of the Aristotelian corpus into the Latin West. This took place via the Arab world starting in the thirteen century, and provided the "oxygen and combustibles" that were then "made into fire" by composers, painters, and bookkeepers in what Crosby describes as a "shift to the visual" taken by composers, painters, and bookkeepers.

The ingredients of this revolution in visualization and quantification were, in Crosby's analysis, the birth of polyphonic music at the cathedral of Notre Dame in Paris, the development of perspective in the paintings of the Italian Renaissance, and the adoption of double-entry bookkeeping among 14th-century Italian accountants.

== Reception ==
The Measure of Reality was praised, in the journal Historia Mathematica by mathematician Frank Swetz, as "a pleasant and informative book" surveying some of the trends of quantification in European society during the period; and, by both Swetz and (in Magill's Book Reviews) by Barbara Hauser, for the breadth of the author's scholarship.' Swetz was in some measure critical, especially of the lack of depth and detail on pre-modern measurement systems; and of Crosby not very deeply exploring the idea of modern European worldview being shaped by measurement.

Hauser noted especially the book's recurrent theme in Crosby's work of conflict between the religious and sacred (more in Europe's past) and the secular (more in its future). Her summary of the book's theme:

Crosby describes the far-reaching effects of breaking things into standard units: goods and labor into units of money, music into units of pitch and duration, one's place in this world into units of latitude and longitude, and intellectual and emotional expression into units of words and sentences on a printed page.

For this reviewer Crosby discounts what previous societies achieved by way of mathematics, geometry, and measuring space, time and weights, from the introduction of the zero (Indian) to subdivision in 360 degrees and 60-minute hours (Babylonian), the Greek Pythagorean theorem, the Julian calendar (Roman) all the way to the ancient Athenian Tholos (a bureau for the registering of weights and scales).

For John D. Wilson in Magill's Literary Annual, while the thesis upheld by Crosby was in need of a full demonstration (probably by later writers), the book was nevertheless "enjoyable and highly stimulating ... full of curious lore that encourages readers to look more closely at the habits of thought on which their way of life is built." However, Wilson (like Swetz) felt that Crosby did not really systematically argue his premise, but rather devoted most of the work to exploring examples of quantitative and visual developments without explaining their centrality to a putative new European world-view. Wilson also disputed some of Crosby's specific claims, such as that rhythmic complexity in music requires late-Western-style time quantification and notation.

While criticizing Crosby's hasty connection between quanta and imperialism, historian of science Steven Shapin notes:

Nevertheless, there is something profoundly right about a book that draws historians' attention to the importance of measurement and standardization in coordinating complex activities and in extending power over long distances.

In a 2001 literature review of then-recent macrohistory works, in The American Historical Review historian Gale Stokes examines The Measure of Reality along with thematically similar works, including Guns, Germs, and Steel (1997) by Jared Diamond, The Wealth and Poverty of Nations (1998) by David Landes, ReOrient (1998) by Andre Gunder Frank, and The Great Divergence (2000) by Kenneth Pomeranz, among others. Another book to which Crosby's is compared is Michael Adas' work Machines as a Measure of Man on the role of technology in European imperialism – the difference being that Adas' machine and technologies are, in Crosby's reading, all descending from the quantifying spirit of the age. While conceding that scholars are split when it comes to the methodological value of macrohistorical approaches at all, he divides these works into two general schools of thought on the rise of Europe since the Renaissance: that there was something intrinsically or situationally special about European society, versus that Europe simply "lucked into" a period of dominance through resource acquisition and exploitation at a greater rate than in Asia. Stokes classified Crosby in the first camp, and pointed out that anthropologist Jack Goody, in East in the West (1996) has held that quantification technologies were not uniquely European, but developments from China through India to the Mediterranean since the Bronze Age. Crosby's model stands out in holding European quantification to have become a progressively accelerating cultural habit.

== See also ==
- Sociology of quantification
