= Paolo Vineis =

Italian epidemiologist (born 1951)

Paolo Vineis (born 10 October 1951, in Alba) is an Italian professor of Environmental Epidemiology at Imperial College London.

== Career ==
Vineis main work is on the impact of environmental changes (including air pollution and climate change) on human health and molecules. This includes the use of omics technologies in epidemiological studies, that is the quantitative measurement of global sets of molecules in biological samples using high-throughput techniques, in combination with advanced biostatistics and bioinformatics tools. In particular, the study of epigenomic changes in DNA is currently one of the most promising fields for the identification of long-term environmental fingerprints. The development of the concept of exposome (with Chris Wild, Director of the World Health Organization's International Agency for Research on Cancer, and Stephen Rappaport and Martyn Smith of University of California, Berkeley's School of Public Health), led to Vineis being awarded a grant from the European Commission (Seventh Framework Programme) in 2012 on exposome research (EXPOsOMICS). The exposome refers to the totality of internal and external exposures which interact at a cellular and systems level to generate a metabolic/ molecular signature which can be used to gain new understanding of the transition from health to disease. Vineis is also the coordinator of the Horizon 2020 LIFEPATH project, whose aim is to understand the determinants of diverging ageing pathways among individuals belonging to different socio-economic groups. This is achieved by integrating social science approaches with biology, using omics measurements (particularly epigenomics). Vineis was also the director of the Unit of Molecular and Genetic Epidemiology, Italian Institute of Genomic Medicine (IIGM), Turin, Italy. Vineis has published many research articles on environmental risks and has written several books on health, causality and the ethics of health care. He is a fellow of the National Academy of Sciences in Italy (Lincei).

== Selected publications ==
=== Selected articles ===
- Vineis P, Bartsch H, Caporaso N, Harrington AM, Kadlubar FF, Landi MT, Malaveille C, Shields PG, Skipper P, Talaska G, et al. Genetically based N-acetyltransferase metabolic polymorphism and low-level environmental exposure to carcinogens. Nature. 1994 May 12;369(6476):154-6
- Berwick M, and Vineis P. Markers of DNA repair and susceptibility to cancer in humans: an epidemiologic review. Journal of the National Cancer Institute 92, no. 11 (2000): 874-897.
- Vineis P., Alavanja M., Buffler P., Fontham E., Franceschi S., Gao, Y.T., Gupta P.C., Hackshaw A., Matos E., Samet J., Sitas F., Smith J., Stayner L., Straif K., Thun MJ., Wichmann HE, Wu AH., Zaridze D., Peto R., Doll R. 2004. Tobacco and cancer: recent epidemiological evidence. Journal of the National Cancer Institute, 96(2), pp. 99–106.
- Vineis P, Khan A. Climate change-induced salinity threatens health. Science. 2012 Nov 23;338(6110):1028-9.
- Shenker NS, Polidoro S, van Veldhoven K, Sacerdote C, Ricceri F, Birrell MA, Belvisi MG, Brown R, Vineis P, Flanagan JM. Epigenome-wide association study in the European Prospective Investigation into Cancer and Nutrition (EPIC-Turin) identifies novel genetic loci associated with smoking. Hum Mol Genet. 2013 Mar 1;22(5):843-51
- Khan AE, Scheelbeek PF, Shilpi AB, Chan Q, Mojumder SK, Rahman A, Haines A, Vineis P. Salinity in drinking water and the risk of (pre)eclampsia and gestational hypertension in coastal Bangladesh: a case-control study. PLoS One. 2014 Sep 30;9(9):e108715
- Vineis P, Wild CP. Global cancer patterns: causes and prevention. Lancet. 2014; 383(9916): 549-57.
- Vineis P. Public health and the common good. J Epidemiol Community Health. 2014 Feb;68(2):97-100.
- Vineis P, Stringhini S, Porta M. Environ Res. The environmental roots of non-communicable diseases (NCDs) and the epigenetic impacts of globalization. 2014 Aug;133:424-30.
- Fasanelli F, Baglietto L, Ponzi E, Guida F, Campanella G, Johansson M, Grankvist K, Johansson M, Assumma MB, Naccarati A, Chadeau-Hyam M, Ala U, Faltus C, Kaaks R, Risch A, De Stavola B, Hodge A, Giles GG, Southey MC, Relton CL, Haycock PC, Lund E, Polidoro S, Sandanger TM, Severi G, Vineis P. Hypomethylation of smoking-related genes is associated with future lung cancer in four prospective cohorts. Nature Communications. 2015 Dec 15;6:10192.
- Bray F, Jemal A, Torre LA, Forman D, Vineis P. Long-term Realism and Cost-effectiveness: Primary Prevention in Combatting Cancer and Associated Inequalities Worldwide. J Natl Cancer Inst. 2015 Sep 30;107(12):djv273.
- Stringhini S, Polidoro S, Sacerdote C, Kelly RS, van Veldhoven K, Agnoli C, Grioni S, Tumino R, Giurdanella MC, Panico S, Mattiello A, Palli D, Masala G, Gallo V, Castagné R, Paccaud F, Campanella G, Chadeau-Hyam M, Vineis P. Life-course socioeconomic status and DNA methylation of genes regulating inflammation. Int J Epidemiol. 2015 Aug;44(4):1320-30
- Vineis P, Saracci R. Conflicts of interest matter and awareness is needed. J Epidemiol Community Health. 2015 Oct;69(10):1018-20.143

=== Books ===
- Vineis Paolo. Health without borders. Epidemics in the era of globalization. Springer International Publishing AG. 2017.ISBN 9783319524450
- Vineis, Paolo. Salute senza confini: le epidemie al tempo della globalizzazione. Torino: Codice, 2014. ISBN 9788875784416
- Vineis, Paolo, and Roberto Satolli. I due dogmi: oggettività della scienza e integralismo etico. Milano: Feltrinelli, 2009. ISBN 9788807104497
- Vineis, Paolo, and Nerina Dirindin. In buona salute: dieci argomenti per difendere la sanità pubblica. Torino: Einaudi, 2004. ISBN 9788806165888
- Vineis, Paolo. Nel crepuscolo della probabilità: la medicina tra scienza ed etica. Torino: Einaudi, 1999 ISBN 9788806147181
