= Roman Frigg =

Swiss philosopher (born 1972)

Roman Frigg (born 1972) is a Swiss philosopher and a professor at the Department of Philosophy, Logic and Scientific Method at the London School of Economics, where he also directs its Centre for Philosophy of Natural and Social Science. He is also visiting professor at the Munich Centre for Mathematical Philosophy at LMU Munich. In 2016, he was awarded the Friedrich Wilhelm Bessel Research Award.

Frigg obtained his MSc in Theoretical Physics at the University of Basel and his PhD in Philosophy at the London School of Economics and Political Science under Nancy Cartwright and Carl Hoefer, with the thesis entitled Re-presenting Scientific Representation.

== Philosophy ==
Frigg's philosophy draws extensively from his physics background. He often takes examples from the field to demonstrate how order is emergent, holistic, and contextual by universal and exceptionless laws. For instance, together with Robert Bishop, he explained that there is self-organization and patterns of emergent order in the universe rather than a system being built up just from independently calculated movement of its part. This theory is applied to explain phenomena such as heavenly bodies, global politics, and even family life, among others with the view that a domain is regarded as ordered once its objects are seen as behaving according to a general law.

Along with some philosophers like Gabrielle Contessa and Peter Godfrey-Smith, Frigg also theorizes that there are parallels between theoretical modelling and works of fiction that involve fictional characters. For the philosopher, the best way to understand mathematical models is to approach it as if they were more closely related to literary fictions than to bits of mathematics. This can be demonstrated in the way Frigg draws from Kendall Walton's theory, which offers a framework of understanding games of make-believe and uses it to understand the nature and varieties of representation in the arts of art and fiction. Frigg proposed that scientists' prepared descriptions are analogous to props in games of make believe and that the descriptions do not require imaginings about actual objects but ask us to imagine a model-system. It is believed that this approach addresses the concept of model individuation - that "if models are simply mathematical objects, then when two distinct models use the same mathematics, we will not be able to individuate them as separate objects."

== Selected publications ==
- Roman Frigg, Re-presenting Scientific Representation. London School of Economics, University of London, September 2003.
- Roman Frigg, Matthew Hunter (eds.). Beyond mimesis and convention: representation in art and science. Springer Netherlands, 2010.

Articles, a selection:

- Frigg, Roman (2003). "On the property structure of realist collapse interpretations of quantum mechanics and the so-called "counting anomaly"" (PDF). International Studies in the Philosophy of Science. 17 (1). Informa UK Limited: 43–57. doi:10.1080/02698590305232. ISSN 0269-8595. S2CID 10241494.
- Frigg, Roman; Reiss, Julian (25 June 2009). "The philosophy of simulation: hot new issues or same old stew?" (PDF). Synthese. 180 (1). Springer Science and Business Media LLC: 77. doi:10.1007/s11229-009-9577-x. ISSN 0039-7857. S2CID 19243684.
- Frigg, Roman (2006). "Scientific Representation and the Semantic View of Theories" (PDF). Theoria. 55 (2). The University of Chicago Press: 183–206.
- Frigg, Roman (27 March 2009). "Models and fiction". Synthese. 172 (2). Springer Science and Business Media LLC: 251–268. doi:10.1007/s11229-009-9505-0. ISSN 0039-7857. S2CID 1685834.
- Frigg, Roman; Votsis, Ioannis (2011). "Everything you always wanted to know about structural realism but were afraid to ask" (PDF). European Journal for Philosophy of Science. 1 (2). Springer Science and Business Media LLC: 227–276. doi:10.1007/s13194-011-0025-7. ISSN 1879-4912. S2CID 1500468.
- Roman, Frigg; Hartmann, Stephan (27 February 2006). "Models in Science". In Zalta, Edward N. (ed.). The Stanford Encyclopedia of Philosophy (Fall 2012 ed.).
