= Peter Menzies (philosopher) =

Australian philosopher (1953–2015)

Peter Charles Menzies (5 February 1953 – 6 February 2015) was an Australian philosopher and past president of the Australasian Association of Philosophy, who held teaching positions at Macquarie University, University of Sydney, and Australian National University. He specialized in metaphysics, especially the philosophy of causation. He became a fellow of the Australian Academy of the Humanities in 2007.

Menzies was a doctoral student of Nancy Cartwright at Stanford University where he received his PhD in 1984. He was also later mentored by D. H. Mellor.

Menzies and Huw Price developed a version of agency theory of causation, which is a formulation of the manipulability theory of causation. In this view, human actors play an important role in cause and effect.
