= The Politics of Large Numbers =

1998 book by Alain Desrosières (English translation of 1993 original)

The Politics of Large Numbers: A History of Statistical Reasoning
- Author: Alain Desrosières
- Original title: La politique des grands nombres: Histoire de la raison statistique
- Translator: Camille Naish
- Language: French
- Subject: History of statistics
- Publication date: 1993
- English publication date: 1998
- ISBN: 978-2-70716504-6

The Politics of Large Numbers:A History of Statistical Reasoning is a book by French statistician, sociologist and historian of science, Alain Desrosières, which was originally published in French in 1993. The English translation, by Camille Naish, was published in 1998 by Harvard University Press.

== Synopsis ==
Alain Desrosières's ambition is to reconcile an “Internal” history of the field, focusing on theory building and data collection, with an “External” history, examining the social conditions where and why a discipline develops. In his words, applying a science-in-the-making perspective “the distinction between technical and social objects—underlying the separation between internal and external history— disappears” (p. 5).

The work of Desrosières mobilize the French style of social analysis of cognitive forms, looking at statistics as the ensemble of concepts, methods, and practices concerned with "making up things that hold".

A central part of the book explores how socio-political structures of France, Britain, Germany, and the United States affect the establishment and evolution of the nationals statistical offices in these countries. The author discusses in depth how the activity of categorization, allocating individuals to classes, provide the encoding necessary for the realization of statistical constructs, following Durkheim's motto to 'treat social facts as things', thus creating new entities as poverty or unemployment. This project that Desrosières names 'objectification' is also offered by the author as a way to reconcile objective and subjective visions of probabilities, a dichotomy he retraces to the fourteenth-century confrontation between realists and nominalists.

== Reactions ==
Among the critiques to this work is that it reads more as a work of sociology and political economy than as a technical account of how statistical operations developed, and the critical balance Desrosières needs to maintain between defending the necessity and legitimacy of critical attacks on statistical concepts and methods in the name of sociopolitical progress and the stated need for "durably solidified forms" of statistical technique and concepts.

== Related readings ==
- Ian Hacking, 2006. The Emergence of Probability : A Philosophical Study of Early Ideas about Probability, Induction and Statistical Inference. Cambridge University Press.
- Theodore M. Porter, 1988. The Rise of Statistical Thinking, 1820–1900. Reprint edition. Princeton, NJ: Princeton University Press.
- Stephen M. Stigler, 1986. The History of Statistics: The Measurement of Uncertainty before 1900. Cambridge, Mass.: Belknap Press.

== See also ==
- Sociology of quantification
