= Minerva (Springer journal) =

- Discipline: Sociology
- Language: English
- Edited by: Peter Weingart

Publication details
- History: 1962–present
- Publisher: Springer Science+Business Media
- Frequency: Quarterly
- Impact factor: 1.784 (2017)

Standard abbreviations
- ISO 4: Minerva

Indexing
- ISSN: 0026-4695 (print); 1573-1871 (web)
- LCCN: 67005277
- OCLC no.: 1039264639

Links
- Journal homepage; Online archive

Minerva: A Review of Science, Learning and Policy is a quarterly peer-reviewed academic journal covering the sociological study of scientific knowledge and research. It was established in 1962, replacing a series of bulletins that had been published by the CIA-funded Congress for Cultural Freedom's Committee on Science and Freedom beginning in 1954. It is published by Springer Science+Business Media and the editor-in-chief is Peter Weingart (Bielefeld University). Since 2013, the journal's home institution has been the Institute for Interdisciplinary Studies of Science (I²SOS) at Bielefeld University.

== Editors-in-chief ==
Past editors-in-chief of Minerva are:

- Roy MacLeod (2000–2008)
- Michael Shattock (1995–1999)
- Edward Shils (1962–1994)

== Literature ==
- Roy MacLeod: Consensus, Civility, and Community: The Origins of Minerva and the Vision of Edward Shils, in: Minerva, September 2016, Volume 54, Issue 3, pp 255–292.
