= Theodore Porter =

American historian of science (born 1953)

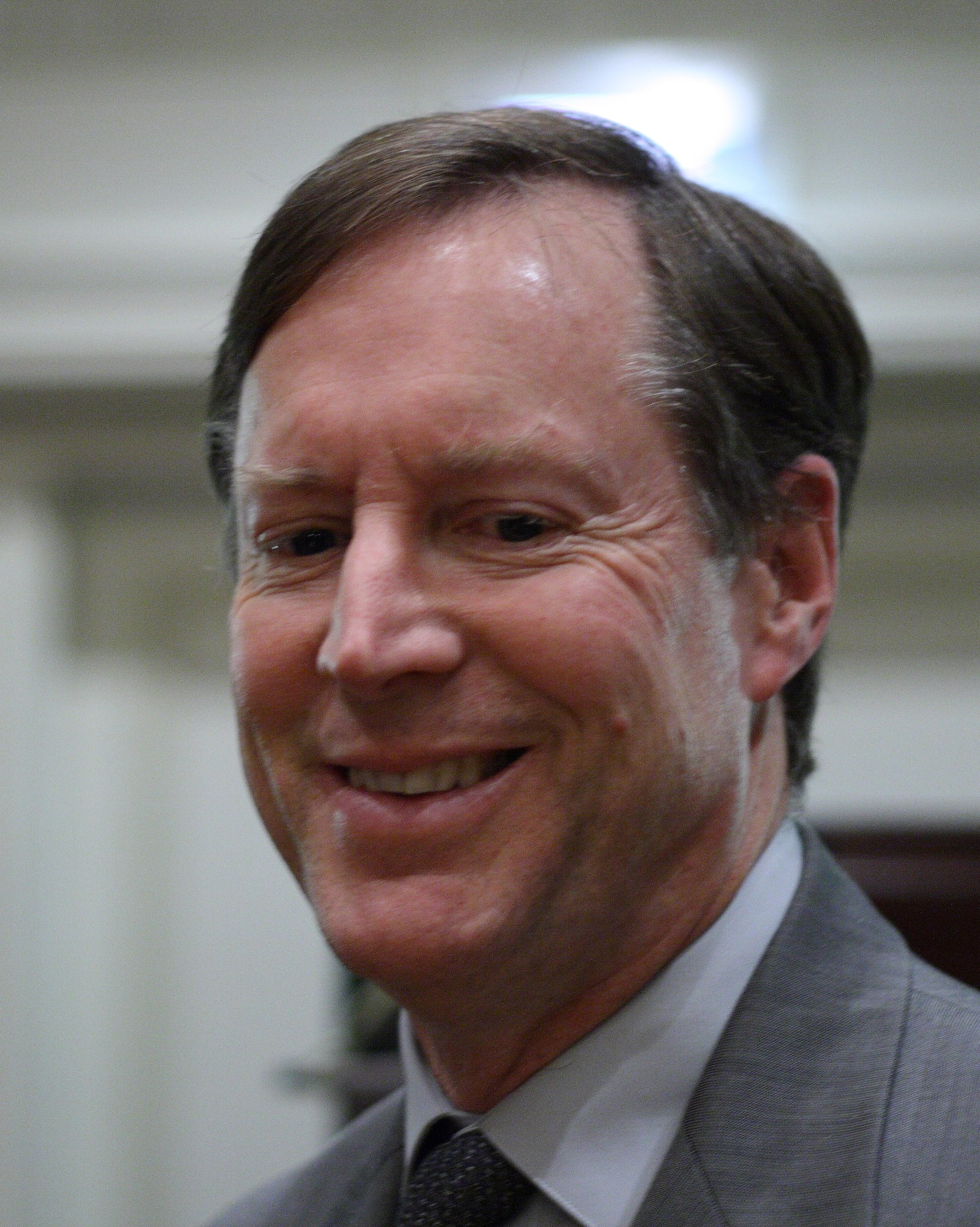
- Porter at the 2007 History of Science Society meeting
- Born: December 3, 1953 (age 72)
- Occupation: Historian of science
- Awards: Guggenheim Fellowship (1989); Ludwik Fleck Prize (1997); Pfizer Award (2018); George Sarton Medal (2023)

Academic background
- Education: Stanford University (AB 1976); Princeton University (PhD 1981)
- Thesis: The Calculus of Liberalism: The Development of Statistical Thinking in the Social and Natural Sciences of the Nineteenth Century

Academic work
- Discipline: History of science
- Sub-discipline: Statistics; Quantification
- Institutions: University of Virginia (1984–1991); University of California, Los Angeles (1991–2023)

Theodore Mark Porter (born December 3, 1953) is a historian of science emeritus in the Department of History at the University of California, Los Angeles. He is known for his histories of statistical thinking and quantification, particularly the sociology of quantification.

== Early life and education ==
Porter was born Theodore Mark Porter on December 3, 1953. He grew up in the state of Washington, in rural areas of Puget Sound. He graduated from Stanford University with an A.B. in history in 1976 and earned a Ph.D. from Princeton University in 1981. His thesis was titled "The Calculus of Liberalism: The Development of Statistical Thinking in the Social and Natural Sciences of the Nineteenth Century" and it became the basis for his first book, The Rise of Statistical Thinking, 1820-1900.

He spent the years 1981–1984 as a postdoctoral researcher at the California Institute of Technology as an Andrew W. Mellon postdoctoral fellow. During that time, in 1982–1983, he participated in the Center for Interdisciplinary Research, Bielefeld program "The Probabilistic Revolution" organized by Lorenz Krüger, Ian Hacking, and Nancy Cartwright, where he developed several lasting professional projects and friendships, for instance with Lorraine Daston, Stephen Stigler, and M. Norton Wise.

== Career ==
Porter became a professor of history at the University of Virginia in 1984 and remained there until 1991, when he moved to the University of California, Los Angeles. There, he rose to the rank of distinguished professor, which he held until his retirement emeritus in 2023. He won a Guggenheim Fellowship in 1989.

He has authored several books, including The Rise of Statistical Thinking, 1820-1900 and Trust in Numbers: The Pursuit of Objectivity in Science and Public Life, the latter a vast reference for sociology of quantification. Trust in Numbers won Porter the Ludwik Fleck Prize for 1997. His most recent book, published by Princeton University Press in 2018, is Genetics in the Madhouse: The Unknown History of Human Heredity, which won the History of Science Society's 2018 Pfizer Award.

In 2008, he was elected to the American Academy of Arts and Sciences. In 2023, he received the George Sarton Medal for lifetime achievement from the History of Science Society. In 2023, on his retirement, he was presented with the ebook festschrift Ted's Numbers, edited by M. Norton Wise, Mary S. Morgan, Emmanuel Didier, Lorraine Daston, and Soraya de Chadarevian.

== Works ==
=== Authored books ===
- The Rise of Statistical Thinking (1986)
  - 2020 paperback edition. Princeton University Press. August 18, 2020. ISBN 9780691208428.
- with Gerd Gigerenzer, Zeno Swijtink, Lorraine Daston, John Beatty, Lorenz Krüger: The Empire of Chance: How Probability and Statistics Changed Everyday Life (1989)
  - 1990 paperback edition. Cambridge University Press. October 1990. ISBN 9780521398381.
- Trust in Numbers: The Pursuit of Objectivity in Science and Public Life (1995)
  - 2020 paperback edition. Princeton University Press. August 18, 2020. ISBN 978-0-691-20841-1.
- Karl Pearson: The Scientific Life in a Statistical Age (2004)
  - 2006 paperback edition. Princeton University Press. January 8, 2006. ISBN 9780691126357.
- Genetics in the Madhouse: The Unknown History of Human Heredity (2018)
  - 2020 paperback edition. Princeton University Press. July 14, 2020. ISBN 978-0-691-20323-2.

=== Edited books ===
- with Dorothy Ross: The Cambridge History of Science, Vol. 7: The Modern Social Sciences (2003)
  - 2003 hardback edition. Cambridge University Press. 2003. ISBN 0-521-59442-1.
- with Tord Larsen, Michael Blim, Kalpana Ram, and Nigel Rapport: Objectification and Standardization: On the Limits and Effects of Ritually Fixing and Measuring Life (2021) (Ritual Studies Monograph Series)
  - 2021 paper edition. Carolina Academic Press. 2021. ISBN 978-1-5310-1895-5.

=== Selected articles ===
- “A Statistical Survey of Gases: Maxwell’s Social Physics.” (1981) Historical Studies in the Physical Sciences 12(1), pp. 77–116. doi:10.2307/27757490
- “Quantification and the Accounting Ideal in Science.” (1992) Social Studies of Science, 22(4), pp. 633–51. JSTOR 285458
- "Statistical and Social Facts from Quetelet to Durkheim." (1995) Sociological Perspectives, 38(1), pp. 15–26. doi:10.2307/1389259
- “Speaking Precision to Power: The Modern Political Role of Social Science.” (2006) Social Research, 73(4), pp. 1273–94. JSTOR 40971883
- "Is the Life of the Scientist a Scientific Unit?" (2006) Isis, 97(2), pp. 314–321. doi:10.1086/504737 JSTOR 10.1086/504737
- “Thin Description: Surface and Depth in Science and Science Studies.” (2012) Osiris, 27(1), pp. 209–26. doi:10.1086/667828
- "Funny Numbers." (2013) Culture Unbound, 4(4), pp. 585–598. doi:10.3384/cu.2000.1525.124585
