= Stephan Hartmann =

German philosopher of science (born 1968)

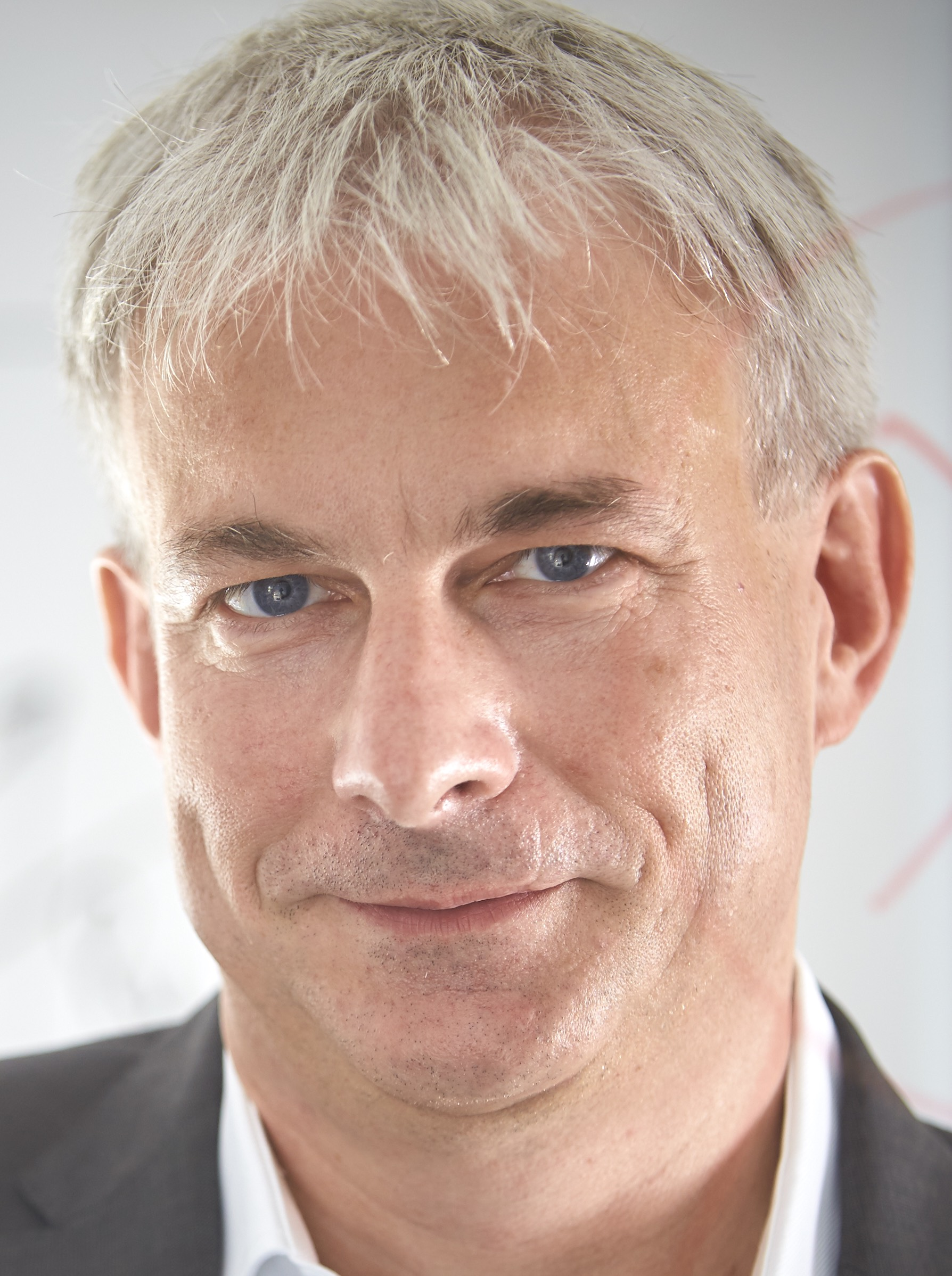
- Stephan Hartmann (2015)
- Born: 1 March 1968 (age 58); Limburg an der Lahn, Germany

Academic background
- Education: University of Giessen
- Website: http://www.stephanhartmann.org/

Stephan Hartmann (born 1 March 1968) is a German philosopher and Professor of Philosophy of Science at LMU Munich, known for his contributions to formal epistemology.

== Biography ==
Hartmann was born in Limburg an der Lahn in Hesse, Germany. He studied physics and philosophy at the University of Giessen in Germany and received his bachelor's degree in 1989. He received his PhD in philosophy from the same university in 1995. He was a visiting scholar at the University of Washington from 1991 to 1992. He became a lecturer in philosophy at the University of Konstanz in 1996 and taught there for two years before becoming an assistant professor of philosophy in 1998. Hartmann was a fellow at the Center for Philosophy of Science at the University of Pittsburgh from 2000 to 2001. Back in Germany in 2002 at the University of Konstanz he headed the research group Philosophy, Probability and Modelling together with Luc Bovens.

From 2004 to 2006 he led the Centre for Philosophy of Natural and Social Science (CPNSS) at the London School of Economics and Political Science, and became Professor in LSE's Department of Philosophy, Logic and Scientific Method. In 2007, he became Professor of Philosophy at the Tilburg University, The Netherlands, where he founded and led the Tilburg Center for Logic and Philosophy of Science (TiLPS).

In 2012 Hartmann became Professor of Philosophy of Science in the Faculty of Philosophy, Philosophy of Science and the Study of Religion at LMU Munich, where he also is co-director of the Munich Center for Mathematical Philosophy (MCMP). Hartmann is President of the European Philosophy of Science Association (2013–17) and President of the European Society for Analytic Philosophy (2014-2017). Since 2016, he is a member of the German National Academy of Sciences, Leopoldina, and since 2019, he is a member of the Bavarian Academy of Sciences and Humanities.

== Publications ==
- 2003. Bayesian Epistemology (with Luc Bovens). Oxford: Oxford University Press.
- 2006. Models in Science (with Roman Frigg). In E. Zalta (ed.): The Stanford Encyclopedia of Philosophy.
- 2011. Probabilities in Physics (ed. with Claus Beisbart). Oxford: Oxford University Press.
- 2011. Explanation, Prediction, and Confirmation (ed. with Dennis Dieks, Wenceslao J. Gonzalez, Thomas Uebel and Marcel Weber). Berlin: Springer. (The Philosophy of Science in a European Perspective series).
- 2019. Bayesian Philosophy of Science (with Jan Sprenger). Oxford: Oxford University Press.
