= Sally Engle Merry =

American anthropologist (1944–2020)

Professor Sally Engle Merry
- Born: December 1, 1944
- Died: September 8, 2020 (aged 75)
- Known for: Colonizing Hawai'i: The Cultural Power of Law, The Seductions of Quantification: Measuring Human Rights, Gender Violence, and Sex Trafficking
- Awards: Franz Boas prize

Academic background
- Education: Wellesley College, Yale University, Brandeis University
- Thesis: The Meaning and Management of Danger in a High-Crime Urban Neighborhood (1979)

Academic work
- Discipline: Anthropology
- Sub-discipline: Legal Anthropology
- Institutions: New York University

Sally Starr Engle Merry (December 1, 1944 – September 8, 2020) was an American anthropologist. She was the Silver Professor of Anthropology and Faculty Co-Director of the Center for Human Rights and Global Justice at the New York University School of Law. Merry had also been president of the American Ethnological Society, the Law and Society Association, and the Association for Political and Legal Anthropology. She served as a member of the editorial board of PoLAR: Political and Legal Anthropology Review.

== Early life and education ==
Sally Engle was born on December 1, 1944, in Philadelphia's western suburbs to Robert F. Engle Jr. and Mary Phillips Engle. Her father worked as a research chemist for DuPont. Her mother taught French at Media Friends School and later, served as its director. Robert's family were Quakers who migrated from England to Pennsylvania in the 1600s. Mary's family had come to Philadelphia from Wales in the late 1800s, and established a successful import-export business in iron and steel. Sally was raised with twin sister, Patricia Lee Engle, and older brother Robert F. Engle III. Sally graduated with honours in 1962 from Westtown School. She then attended Wellesley College. Sally majored in anthropology with in 1966 with honours and was elected to Phi Beta Kappa. She received her Master's degree at Yale University and PhD at Brandeis University.

Sally married Paul Henry Merry on June 4, 1967. Paul was a Harvard University graduate. They met during Sally's freshman year at Wellesley. After their marriage, they moved to San Angelo, Texas, where he trained in signals intelligence in the United States Army Security Agency. He was posted to West Berlin to conduct intelligence analysis. In West Germany, Sally studied German and anthropology at the Free University of Berlin.

== Career ==
Merry joined the faculty at New York University (NYU) in 2005 after serving as the Marion Butler McLean Professor in the History of Ideas in the Department of Anthropology at Wellesley College. Her book Human Rights and Gender Violence: Translating International Law into Local Justice received the 2010 J. I. Staley Prize. Two years later, she co-edited Governance by Indicators: Global Power through Quantification and Rankings with three other NYU professors. In 2013, Merry was the recipient of an honorary Doctor of Laws from McGill University.

== Legacy ==
The Routledge Handbook of Law and Society is dedicated to her with the words, "...for her lifelong quest for greater understanding of law’s social life."

== Awards ==
- 2007 Kalven Prize, Law and Society Association.
- 2019 Franz Boas Award for Exemplary Service to Anthropology, American Anthropological Association.

== Publications ==
=== Books ===
- 1981 Urban Danger: Life in a Neighborhood of Strangers. Philadelphia, PA: Temple University Press.
- 1990 Getting Justice and Getting Even: Legal Consciousness Among Working-Class Americans. Chicago, IL: University of Chicago Press.
- 1993 The Possibility of Popular Justice: A Case Study of American Community Mediation. Codirigé avec Neal Milner. Ann Arbor, MI: Univ. of Michigan Press.
- 2000 Colonizing Hawai'i: The Cultural Power of Law. Princeton, NJ: Princeton University Press.
- 2004 Law and Empire in the Pacific: Hawai'i and Fiji. Codirigé with Donald Brenneis. School of American Research Press, Santa Fe, NM
- 2006 Human Rights and Gender Violence: Translating International Law into Local Justice. Chicago: University of Chicago Press.
- 2007 The Practice of Human Rights: Tracking Law Between the Global and the Local. Codirigé with Mark Goodale. Cambridge: Cambridge University Press.
- 2008 Gender Violence: A Cultural Introduction. London: Blackwell.
- 2016 The Seductions of Quantification: measuring human rights, gender violence, and sex trafficking, University of Chicago Press
- 2018 Human rights: transformation in practice, co-edited with Tine Strooper, University of Pennsylvania Press

== Personal life ==
Sally and her sister Patricia attended school and college graduating from Westtown School and Wellesley College. Patricia earned a PhD from Stanford University in 1971. She later earned reputation as a developmental psychologist, and became a senior advisor for UNICEF. Sally's brother Robert III became a distinguished economist, winning a Nobel Prize for Economics in 2003.

Merry died on September 8, 2020.
