= Mauricio Suarez =

Spanish philosopher

Mauricio Suárez
- Born: 5 October 1968 (age 57)
- Education: University of Edinburgh (B.Sc.); London School of Economics (Ph.D.)
- Scientific career
- Fields: History and Philosophy of Science, Philosophy of Physics, Philosophy of Biology, Philosophy of Chemistry, Epistemology, Methodology
- Workplaces: Complutense University of Madrid
- Thesis: Models of the world, data-models and the practice of science: The semantics of quantum theory (1997)
- Doctoral advisor: Nancy Cartwright

Mauricio Suárez is a Spanish philosopher who specialises in philosophy and history of the natural sciences.

== Education and career ==
He earned a BSc in astrophysics from the University of Edinburgh (1991), and an MSc and a PhD in philosophy of science from the London School of Economics (1992 and 1997 respectively). His doctoral thesis was on "Models of the world, data-models and the practice of science: The semantics of quantum theory". He currently holds a professorship (Cátedra, with habilitation / acreditación in 2009) in Logic and Philosophy of Science at Complutense University of Madrid.

His previous appointments include:

- Junior lecturer in philosophy of physics, University of Oxford (1995–1996)
- Teaching and research fellow, University of St Andrews (1996–1997)
- Postdoctoral research fellow, Northwestern University (1997–1998)
- Permanent lecturer, University of Bristol (1997–2003)
- Associate tenured professor, Complutense University of Madrid (2002–2016)

In addition he was junior research fellow at Wolfson College, Oxford (1995-6); a visiting scholar at the University of Sydney (2003), and at Harvard University (2007, 2009, 2011); a visiting professorial fellow at the Institute of Philosophy, School of Advanced Study, London University (2012), where he also held a Marie Curie Senior Research Fellowship (2013–2015); the first UNA-Europa visiting professor in philosophy at the University of Paris 1 Pantheon-Sorbonne in December 2018; and a research fellow at the Institute Vienna Circle in 2020 and 2022. He was one of the founders of the European Philosophy of Science Association and served as its vice president from 2009 to 2011. He has published on models, representation, causal inference, propensities, and the philosophies of quantum mechanics, evolutionary biology, chemistry. He edited Fictions in Science (Routledge, 2009), Probabilities, Causes and Propensities in Physics (Springer, 2011), and coedited EPSA07: Launch of the European Philosophy of Science Association, vol. I and II (Springer, 2010). He is the author of Filosofía de la Ciencia: Historia y Práctica (Tecnos, 2019, an advanced textbook in the philosophy of science for the Spanish speaking world), Philosophy of Probability and Statistical Modelling (Cambridge University Press, 2020), and Inference and Representation: A Study in Modeling Science (University of Chicago Press, 2024)
