= Philip Mirowski =

Philosopher of economic thought

Philip Mirowski (born 21 August 1951 in Jackson, Michigan) is a historian and philosopher of economic thought at the University of Notre Dame. He received a PhD in Economics from the University of Michigan in 1979.

== Career ==
In his 1989 book More Heat than Light, Mirowski reveals a history of how physics has drawn inspiration from economics and how economics has sought to emulate physics, especially with regard to the theory of value. He traces the development of the energy concept in Western physics and its subsequent effect on the invention and promulgation of neoclassical economics, the modern orthodox theory.

Mirowski's thesis has been challenged by Hal Varian and defended, with some reservations, by D. Wade Hands.

Machine Dreams explores the historical influences of the military and the cyborg sciences on neoclassical economics. The neglected influence of John von Neumann and his theory of automata are key themes throughout the book. Mirowski claims that many of the developments in neoclassical economics in the 20th century, from game theory to computational economics, are the unacknowledged result of von Neumann's plans for economics. The work expands Mirowski's vision for a computational economics, one in which various market types are constructed in a similar fashion to Noam Chomsky's generative grammar. The role of economics is to explore how various market types perform in measures of complexity and efficiency, with more complicated markets being able to incorporate the effects of the less complex. By complexity Mirowski means something analogous to computational complexity theory in computer science. Mirowski's criticism of game theory is noted by financial economist and historian Peter L. Bernstein.

In his book Never Let a Serious Crisis Go to Waste, Mirowski concludes that neoliberal thought has become so pervasive that any countervailing evidence serves only to further convince disciples of its ultimate truth. Once neoliberalism became a Theory of Everything, providing a revolutionary account of self, knowledge, information, markets, and government, it could no longer be falsified by anything as trifling as data from the "real" economy.

== Books ==
=== As author ===
- The Birth of the Business Cycle. New York: Garland Press, 1985, ISBN 9781138858176.
- Against Mechanism: Protecting Economics from Science. Totowa, N.J.: Rowman & Littlefield, 1988, ISBN 978-0-8476-7436-7.
- More Heat than Light: Economics as Social Physics, Physics as Nature's Economics. Cambridge University Press, 1989, ISBN 0-521-42689-8.
- Machine Dreams: Economics Becomes a Cyborg Science. Cambridge University Press, 2001, ISBN 0-521-77526-4.
- The Effortless Economy of Science? Durham, NC: Duke University Press, 2004, (papers 463 pp.) ISBN 0-8223-3310-4.
- Science-Mart: Privatizing American Science. Harvard University Press, 2011, ISBN 9780674046467.
- Never Let a Serious Crisis Go to Waste: How Neoliberalism Survived the Financial Meltdown. Verso Books, 2013, ISBN 9781781680797.
- The Knowledge We Have Lost in Information: A History of Information and Knowledge in Economics (with E. Nik-Khah). Oxford University Press, 2017, ISBN 9780190270056.

=== As editor ===
- (editor) Edgeworth's Writings on Chance, Probability and Statistics (1994)
- (editor) Natural Images in Economics: Markets Read in Tooth and Claw (1994)
- (editor) The Collected Economic Works of William Thomas Thornton (1999)
- (editor with E. Sent) Science Bought and Sold (2001)
- (co-edited with R. van Horn and T. Stapleford) Building Chicago Economics: New Perspectives on the History of America’s Most Powerful Economics Program (2011)
- Philip Mirowski; Dieter Plehwe, eds. (2009). The Road from Mont Pèlerin: The Making of the Neoliberal Thought Collective (PDF). Harvard University Press. ISBN 978-0674033184. OCLC 257554337. OCLC 748925780
- Philip Mirowski, Dieter Plehwe and Quinn Slobodian, Eds., (2020) Nine Lives of Neoliberalism, London, New York: Verso, ISBN 978-1-78873-255-0, (ebook version )
