= Caroline Relton =

British biochemist

Caroline Laura Relton
- Education: Newcastle University
- Scientific career
- Workplaces: University of Bristol; London School of Hygiene and Tropical Medicine
- Thesis: The identification and characterisation of genes associated with insulin resistance (1998)

Caroline Laura Relton is a British biochemist, Professor and Pro Director for Research and Academic Development at the London School of Hygiene and Tropical Medicine. Her research considers genetic and epigenetic epidemiology and looks to understand the role of DNA methylation in complex disease.

== Early life and education ==
Relton studied applied biology and nutritional science as an undergraduate. She earned a postgraduate certificate in science education in 1990. She was a doctoral research student in molecular genetics at Newcastle University. Her research involved investigations into genes associated with insulin resistance. After completing her doctorate she was appointed to the faculty at Newcastle, a position she held for 12 years.

== Research and career ==
She moved to the University of Bristol in 2012. Relton investigates the variations in epidemiology that cause disease, and how these can be used to predict disease. She uses population-based approaches to study how behavioural, psychological, and social variables relate to DNA methylation. She was one of the first researchers to show that DNA could be a predictor of body weight: factors that influence the development of a baby in the womb (e.g. diet, smoking, stress) can predispose a child to obesity. Relton studied this using the Children of the 90s study. She used data from 520,000 people across Europe to demonstrate a link between levels of B vitamins and lung cancer, showing a reduced risk of lung cancer among people with high levels of Vitamin B6 and methionine.

Alongside her research position at Bristol, Relton is Pro-Director of Research and Development at the London School of Hygiene and Tropical Medicine.

== Select publications ==
- Gibran Hemani; Jie Zheng; Benjamin Elsworth; et al. (30 May 2018). "The MR-Base platform supports systematic causal inference across the human phenome". eLife. 7. doi:10.7554/elife.34408. ISSN 2050-084X. PMC 5976434. PMID 29846171. Wikidata Q55427190.
- Bonnie R Joubert; Janine F Felix; Paul Yousefi; et al. (30 March 2016). "DNA Methylation in Newborns and Maternal Smoking in Pregnancy: Genome-wide Consortium Meta-analysis". American Journal of Human Genetics. 98 (4): 680–696. doi:10.1016/j.ajhg.2016.02.019. ISSN 0002-9297. PMC 4833289. PMID 27040690. Wikidata Q36802570.
- Simone Wahl; Alexander Drong; Benjamin Lehne; et al. (21 December 2016). "Epigenome-wide association study of body mass index, and the adverse outcomes of adiposity". Nature. 541 (7635): 81–86. doi:10.1038/nature20784. ISSN 1476-4687. PMC 5570525. PMID 28002404. Wikidata Q38779718.
