= Nancy Cartwright (philosopher) =

American philosopher of science

Nancy Cartwright FBA FAcSS
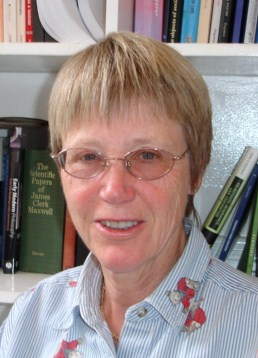
- Cartwright in 2007
- Born: June 24, 1944 (age 82); Pennsylvania, U.S.

Education
- Education: University of Pittsburgh; University of Illinois Chicago

Philosophical work
- Era: Contemporary philosophy
- Region: Western philosophy
- School: Analytic; Stanford school
- Institutions: University of Maryland; Stanford University; London School of Economics; Durham University; University of California, San Diego
- Doctoral students: Roman Frigg; Saif al-Islam Gaddafi; Jeremy Howick; Peter Menzies; Mauricio Suarez
- Notable students: Hasok Chang; Naomi Oreskes
- Main interests: Philosophy of science
- Notable ideas: Entity realism

President of the DLMPST/IUHPST
- In office 2020–2023
- Preceded by: Menachem Magidor
- Succeeded by: Valentin Goranko

Nancy Cartwright's voice
from the BBC programme In Our Time, July 2, 2009

Nancy Cartwright, Lady Hampshire (born June 24, 1944) is an American philosopher of science. She is a professor of philosophy at the University of California, San Diego and the University of Durham. Currently, she is the past president of the Division for Logic, Methodology and Philosophy of Science and Technology (DLMPST) of the International Union of History and Philosophy of Science and Technology under the International Science Council (ISC). For the 2025–26 academic year, she was the Centenary Visiting Professor in Philosophy, Politics and Economics (PPE) at the University of Oxford.

== Education and career ==
Cartwright earned her BSc from the University of Pittsburgh in mathematics and her Ph.D. in philosophy at the University of Illinois at Chicago (Congress Circle campus). Her thesis was on the concept of mixture in quantum mechanics. Before taking her current appointments, she taught at the University of Maryland, Stanford University and the London School of Economics (LSE). She has held visiting appointments at the University of Oslo, Princeton University, Caltech, the University of Pittsburgh, the University of Cambridge and UCLA. She is currently Tsing Hua Honorary Distinguished Chair Professor at the National Tsing Hua University in Taiwan and visiting research fellow at Ca' Foscari University of Venice. She co-founded the Centre for Philosophy of Natural and Social Science (CPNSS) at the LSE and the Centre for Humanities Engaging Science and Society (CHESS) at the University of Durham.

Cartwright has mentored several students in England and the United States who have gone on to become professional philosophers of science, including Naomi Oreskes, Mauricio Suarez, Roman Frigg, Jeremy Howick, Peter Menzies, and Hasok Chang. She was also a supervisor of Saif al-Islam Gaddafi, a subsequent source of controversy.

Cartwright was married to the philosopher Stuart Hampshire until his death in 2004. She was also previously married to the philosopher Ian Hacking. She has two daughters and two granddaughters.

== Philosophical work ==
Cartwright's approach to the philosophy of science is associated with the "Stanford school" of Patrick Suppes, John Dupré, Peter Galison and Ian Hacking. It is characterized by an emphasis on scientific practice as opposed to abstract scientific theories. Cartwright has made important contributions to debates on laws of nature, causation and causal inference, scientific models in the natural and social sciences, objectivity and the unity of science. Her recent work focuses on evidence and its use in informing policy decisions.

Carl Hoefer describes Cartwright's philosophy in the following terms:

Nancy Cartwright's philosophy of science is, in her view, a form of empiricism but empiricism in the style of Neurath and Mill, rather than of Hume or Carnap. Her concerns are not with the problems of skepticism, induction, or demarcation; she is concerned with how actual science achieves the successes it does, and what sort of metaphysical and epistemological presuppositions are needed to understand that success.

Cartwright, like many working scientists themselves, takes a rather pragmatic/realist stance toward observations and interventions made by scientists and engineers and particularly toward their connections to causality: Scientists see impurities causing signal loss in a cable, and they stimulate an inverted population, causing it to lase. Given these starting points, there can be no question of a skeptical attitude toward causation, in either singular or generic form. The fundamental role (or better, roles) played by causation in scientific practice is undeniable; what Cartwright does, then, is reconfigure empiricism from the ground up based on this insight. In the reconfiguration process, many mainstays of the received view of science take a beating; especially [...] the fundamentality of laws of nature.

== Honors and awards ==
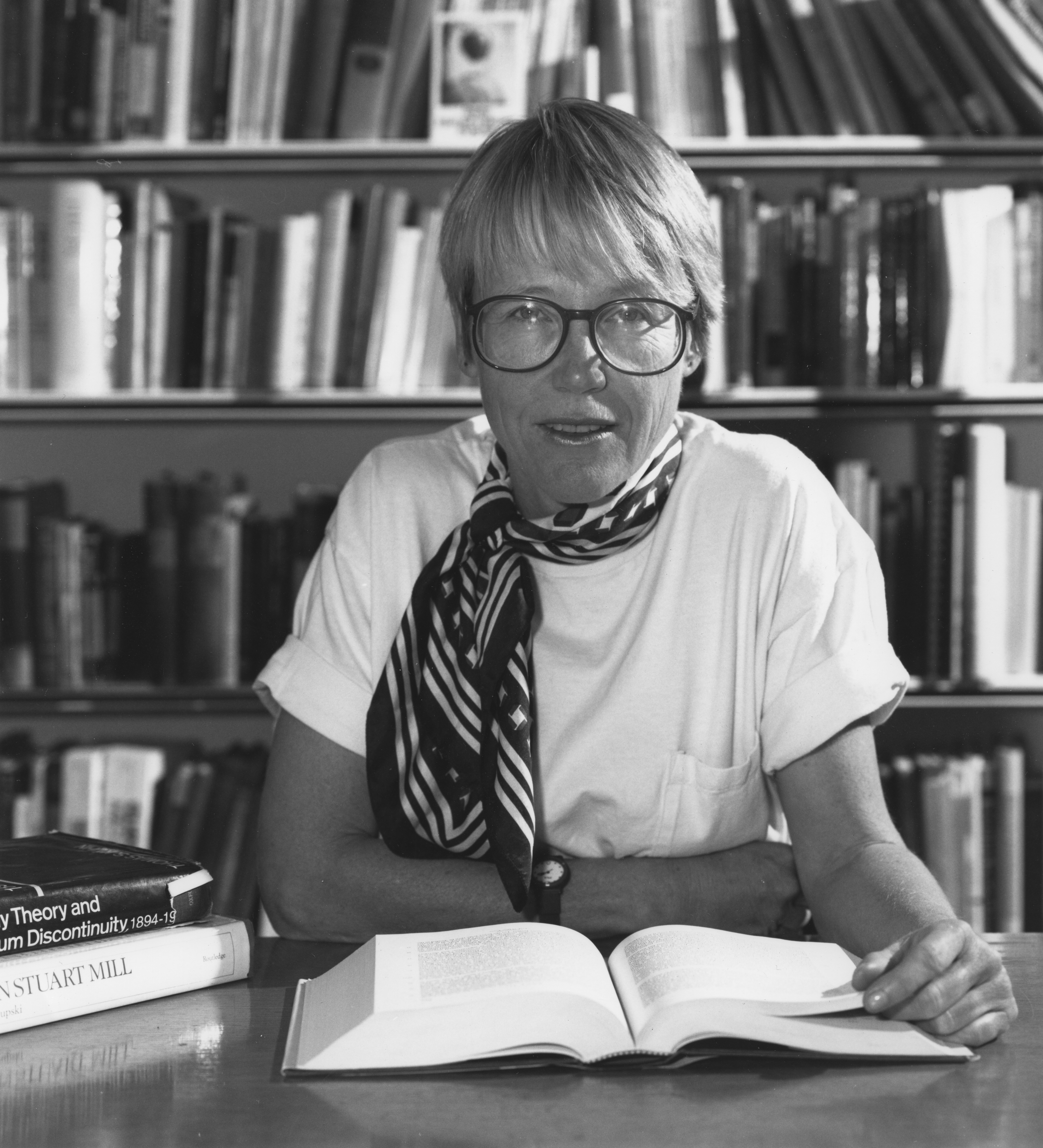
Nancy Cartwright, 1990s.

Cartwright served as the president of the Philosophy of Science Association (2009–10), as vice-president (2007–08) and president (2008–09) of the Pacific Division of the American Philosophical Association, and was elected to be president of the Division for Logic, Methodology and Philosophy of Science and Technology from 2020 to 2023. She is professor emeritus at the London School of Economics. She is also Fellow of the British Academy, a member of the American Academy of Arts and Sciences, a member of the German Academy of Sciences Leopoldina, and a Fellow of the Academy of Social Sciences. She has received honorary degrees from Southern Methodist University and the University of St Andrews as well as a MacArthur Fellowship.

Cartwright was the recipient of the Martin R. Lebowitz Prize for Philosophical Achievement of the Phi Beta Kappa Society 2017 (alongside Elliott Sober) and was awarded the Carl Gustav Hempel Award in 2018 by the Philosophy of Science Association. For 2025 she was awarded the BBVA Foundation Frontiers of Knowledge Award in the category of "Humanities".

In 2017, Cartwright was selected by the American Philosophical Association to deliver the Carus Lectures. She delivered a series entitled Nature, the Artful Modeler: She Reads the New Yorker, Trusts in God, and Takes Short Views. The lectures were published in 2019 alongside additional essays under the title Nature, the Artful Modeler: Lectures on Laws, Science, How Nature Arranges the World and How We Can Arrange It Better.

== Selected works ==
=== Books ===
- Cartwright, Nancy (1983). How the Laws of Physics Lie. Oxford University Press. doi:10.1093/0198247044.001.0001. ISBN 978-0-19-824704-3. Translated to Chinese.
- Nature's Capacities and Their Measurement, Oxford University Press (October 1989) ISBN 0-19-824477-0
- The Dappled World: A Study of the Boundaries of Science, Cambridge University Press (September 1999) ISBN 0-521-64411-9
- Hunting Causes and Using Them: Approaches in Philosophy and Economics, Cambridge University Press (June 2007) ISBN 0-521-86081-4. Translated to Chinese.
- Evidence Based Policy: A Practical Guide to Doing It Better, with Jeremy Hardie, Oxford University Press (2012)
- Philosophy of Social Science: A New Introduction, with Eleonora Montuschi, Oxford University Press (2014)
- Improving Child Safety: Deliberation, Judgement and Empirical Research, with Munro, E., Hardie, J. and Montuschi, E. (2017)
- Nature, the Artful Modeler: Lectures on Laws, Science, How Nature Arranges the World and How We Can Arrange It Better (The Paul Carus Lectures). Open Court (2019)
- A Philosopher Looks at Science. Cambridge University Press (2022)
- The Tangle of Science: Reliability Beyond Method, Rigour, and Objectivity, with Jeremy Hardie, Eleonora Montuschi, Matthew Soleiman and Ann C. Thresher. Oxford University Press (2023)
- Causal Processes and Their Warrant, with Eileen Munro and John Pemberton. Cambridge University Press (2026)

=== Articles ===
- Cartwright, Nancy (1980). "Do the Laws of Physics State the Facts?". Pacific Philosophical Quarterly. 61 (1–2). Wiley: 75–84. doi:10.1111/j.1468-0114.1980.tb00005.x. ISSN 0279-0750.
- Cartwright, Nancy (June 1, 1994). "XII—Fundamentalism vs. the Patchwork of Laws". Proceedings of the Aristotelian Society. 94 (1). Oxford University Press (OUP): 279–292. doi:10.1093/aristotelian/94.1.279. ISSN 0066-7374.
- Cartwright, Nancy (2001). Sugden, Sherwood J. B. (ed.). "What Is Wrong With Bayes Nets?". Monist (in German). 84 (2). Oxford University Press (OUP): 242–264. doi:10.5840/monist20018429. ISSN 0026-9662.
- Cartwright, Nancy (2004). "Causation: One Word, Many Things" (PDF). Philosophy of Science. 71 (5). University of Chicago Press: 805–820. doi:10.1086/426771. ISSN 0031-8248. S2CID 121290974.
- Cartwright, Nancy (2011). "A philosopher's view of the long road from RCTs to effectiveness". The Lancet. 377 (9775). Elsevier BV: 1400–1401. doi:10.1016/s0140-6736(11)60563-1. ISSN 0140-6736. PMID 21520508. S2CID 5722808.

Academic offices
Preceded by Menachem Magidor	President of the Division for Logic, Methodology and Philosophy of Science and Technology of the International Union for History and Philosophy of Science and Technology (DLMPST/IUHPST); 2020–2023	Succeeded by Valentin Goranko
