= Center for Interdisciplinary Research, Bielefeld =

German research institute

Coordinates: 52°1′57.4″N 8°29′36″E

The Center for Interdisciplinary Research (German: Zentrum für interdisziplinäre Forschung (ZiF)) is the Institute for Advanced Study (IAS) in Bielefeld University, Bielefeld, Germany. Founded in 1968, it was the first IAS in Germany and became a model for numerous similar institutes in Europe. The ZiF promotes and provides premises for interdisciplinary and international research groups. Scholars from all countries and all disciplines can carry out interdisciplinary research projects ranging from one-year research groups to short workshops. In the last 40 years numerous renowned researchers lived and worked at ZiF, among them the social scientist Norbert Elias and Nobel Laureates Reinhard Selten, John Charles Harsanyi, Roger B. Myerson and Elinor Ostrom.

== Mission ==
The mission of the ZiF is to encourage, mediate and host interdisciplinary exchange. The concept was developed by German sociologist Helmut Schelsky, who was its first director, serving from 1968 to 1971. Schelsky believed that interdisciplinary exchange is a key driver of scientific progress. Therefore, the ZiF does not focus on a single topic and does not invite individual researchers, but offers scholars the opportunity to carry out interdisciplinary research projects with international colleagues, free from everyday duties. The ZiF offers residential fellowships, grants and conference services. Schelsky wrote:

... systematic and regular discussion, colloquia, critique, and agreement in a group of scientists interested in the same topics, although perhaps from different perspectives, are of the greatest benefit for a scholar and his work.

== Working formats ==
The ZiF funds research groups for one year, "cooperation groups" for 1–6 months and workshops of 2–14 days. Public lectures, authors' colloquia and art exhibitions address wider audiences.

== Structure ==
The ZiF is Bielefeld University’s Institute for Advanced Study. Its Board of Directors consists of five professors of Bielefeld University, assisted by a Scientific Advisory Council consisting of 16 eminent scholars. A staff of about 20 organizes life and work at the ZiF. About 1000 scholars visit the ZiF every year, one third from abroad. They take part in about 40 activities, including one research group, one or two cooperation groups, and about 20 workshops per year. So far about 600 publications have been issued by ZiF projects.

== Living and Working ==
The ZiF is situated in the hilly surroundings of the Teutoburg Forest, close to the university. It has its own campus, surrounded by conference facilities and apartments for the fellows and their families. So the ZiF’s fellows can enjoy the tranquil setting as well as the facilities of the nearby University. A professional infrastructure including library and indoor pool offers pleasant working and living conditions.
