= Andy Stirling =

Andy Stirling (born 3 March 1961) is Professor of science and technology policy at Sussex University. He has a background in the natural sciences, a master's degree in archaeology and social anthropology (Edinburgh) and a D.Phil. in science and technology policy (Sussex).

Formerly a board member of Greenpeace International, Stirling has worked in collaboration with a diverse range of organisations. His research interests include technological risk, innovation policy, scientific uncertainty and public involvement in decision-making, and he has been involved in developing some participatory appraisal methods.

He has served on several policy advisory committees, including the UK Government's Advisory Committee on Toxic Substances and GM Science Review Panel as well as the European Commission's Expert Group on Science and Governance.

== Bibliography ==
- Scoones, Ian; Stirling, Andy, eds. (2020). The Politics of Uncertainty: Challenges of Transformation. Pathways to Sustainability. Abingdon; New York: Routledge. ISBN 978-0-367-90337-4.
