= Mary S. Morgan =

British economist

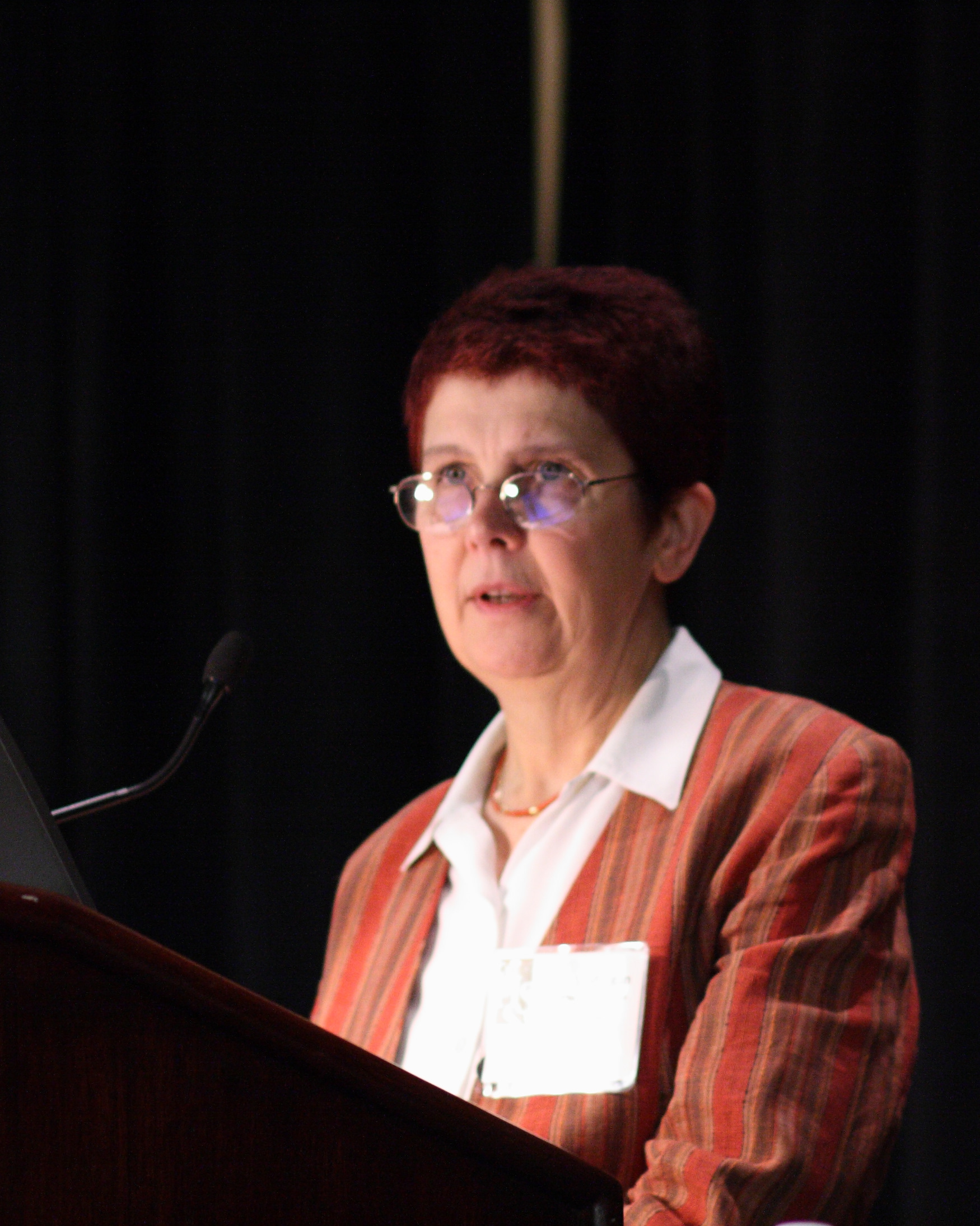
Mary S. Morgan at the 2009 meeting of the History of Science Society

Mary Susanna Morgan OBE FBA FRDAAS is an economist, philosopher, historian, and the Albert O. Hirschman Professor of the History and Philosophy of Economics in the London School of Economics. She was Department Chair of Economic History between 2002 and 2005. In 2002, she was elected a Fellow of the British Academy.

== Biography ==
Morgan graduated from the London School of Economics a Bachelor of Science (BSc) in economics in 1978 and a Doctor of Philosophy (PhD) in 1984. From 1992 to 2002, she worked part-time as Professor of the History and Methodology of Economics in the University of Amsterdam. Since 2002, she has been an overseas member of the Royal Netherlands Academy of Arts and Sciences.

Her most informative period occurred during her PhD, when she was working on the history of econometrics. At the time, she was part of a research group at the ZiF in Bielefeld on 'The Probabilistic Revolution' — a historical and philosophical project in part led by Ian Hacking. That was a time when philosophers of economics were mainly inside economics departments, not in the philosophy of science community.

== Research ==
Her research covers the history and philosophy of economics and statistics, including models, measurements, experiments and observations. She is influential in bridging philosophy of economics with philosophy of science, asking how economists work and think. Her philosophical work focuses on the role of narratives, evidence, case studies, and models in economics and the social sciences. As a historian of science, she interrogates how these have changed over the past century.

She led a major European Commission European Research Council Advanced Investigator Grant titled "Narrative in Science" (2016-2020). Other grants included the project "Re-thinking Case Studies Across the Social Sciences" (2009-2012), "The Nature of Evidence: How Well Do "Facts" Travel?" (2004-2009), and "Models and Their Making in Economics" (1999-2001). Her book The World in the Model (Cambridge University Press, 2012) on the history and philosophy of economics explains how economists use models and economics as a model-based science.

== Most important publications ==
- The History of Econometric Ideas, 1990. ISBN 0-521-42465-8
- The Foundations of Econometric Analysis (with D. F. Hendry), 1995. ISBN 0-521-38043-X
  - Hendry, David F.; Morgan, Mary S. (20 February 1997). 1997 paperback edition. Cambridge University Press. ISBN 0-521-58870-7.
- Models as Mediators (ed. with M. Morrison), 1999.
- The Age of Economic Measurement (ed. with Judy L. Klein), 2001 (History of Political Economy, Annual Supplement to Vol. 33). ISBN 0822365170
- The World in the Model: How Economists Work and Think, 2012. ISBN 978-1-107-00297-5
