= Alain Desrosières =

French statistician, sociologist and historian of science (1940–2013)

- Born: Alain Desrosières; 18 April, 1940; Lyon, France
- Died: 15 February, 2013; Paris, France

Academic work
- Main interests: Sociology, History, Statistics, History of statistics, Science and technology studies

Alain Desrosières (18 April 1940 – 15 February 2013) was a statistician, sociologist and historian of science in France, known for his work in the history of statistics. He is the author of The Politics of Large Numbers: A History of Statistical Reasoning , published in 1993, translated into several languages, including English in 1998, and subsequently reviewed in the London Review of Books in 2000. This described the origins of statistics as technical machinery for administration in the 19th and 20th centuries, including the attempts to measure human and economic development. The text is an account of the statistics and their use in abstracting features of society to better measure and understand them, with particular aims.

His major technical work on the socio-professional categorisation scheme used in French official statistics was updated in five editions over more than fifteen years. Further collected papers were published in two volumes as The Statistical Argument in 2008, and a final collection published posthumously in 2014 as Prouver et Gouverner. His major contribution was to frame public statistics as constructed reality, with categories created to describe society, but tracked carefully using these definitions, thus bridging the opposing views that they are either objective facts or political propaganda due to his unusual combination of sociological study and statistical training.
