= Benedetta Brevini =

Italian academic

- Education: University of Modena and Reggio Emilia; London School of Economics and Political Science; University of Westminster
- Occupations: Academic, journalist
- Employer: University of Sydney

Benedetta Brevini is an Italian academic, author, journalist, and media and technology reformer. Brevini is currently an associate professor of political economy of communication at The University of Sydney and a Senior Visiting Fellow at the London School of Economics and Political Science.

Brevini is known for her political economic analysis, investment in green tech literacy, and explorations of the relationship between artificial intelligence (AI) and the climate crisis. Her most recent book, Is AI Good for the Planet?, was published by Polity in 2021.

== Life and career ==
Brevini initially attended the University of Modena and Reggio Emilia, where she graduated with a Bachelor's degree in Law. Brevini later obtained a Master of Laws and a Master of Science from the London School of Economics and Political Science, where she studied Communication Policy and Regulation. She earned her PhD at London's University of Westminster.

Prior to her career in academia, Brevini worked as a journalist. She was employed by CNBC in Milan, Italy; RAI in New York City, United States; and The Guardian in London, United Kingdom. Brevini has also held tenured positions at City University London and Brunel University London.

Brevini is currently employed as an associate professor of political economy of communication at The University of Sydney. She is also a senior visiting fellow at the London School of Economics and Political Science. Brevini has held further visiting fellowships at WZB in Berlin, Germany, New York University in New York City and the Central European University’s Centre For Media, Data and Society in Budapest, Hungary.

Since 2010, Brevini has assisted multiple public inquiries into public interest journalism and media diversity and media pluralism in Australia and the United Kingdom. Brevini has also consulted for GetUp!, the Open Society Foundations Media Program and Access Info Europe.

In addition to her academic pursuits, Brevini writes for The Guardian’s Comment is Free. She also contributes to numerous web and print publications, including openDemocracy, South China Morning Post, The Conversation, and MediaReform.co.uk. As of February 2023, she is conducting research for the purposes of a new book that will examine communication, data capitalism and the climate emergency.

== Overview of work ==
Brevini is an expert in critical AI, environmental communication and the relationship between data capitalism, AI and the climate crisis. Brevini often operates within the political economy tradition when writing on these issues. She authored Public Service Broadcasting Online (2013) and edited Beyond WikiLeaks (2013) in accordance with the political economy framework, and examined Amazon through the same intellectual lens in Amazon: Understanding a Global Communication Giant (2020). Brevini also lists sustainable communication, communications systems and climate change, and media reforms in comparative perspective amongst her research interests.

Public Service Broadcasting Online: A Comparative European Policy Study of PSB 2.0 (2013)

Within Public Service Broadcasting Online, Brevini explores the extent to which the ethos of public service broadcasting has transitioned to the European internet. Brevini considers this issue with reference to Denmark, France, Spain, Italy and the United Kingdom, where Public Service broadcasting has incurred major reforms that have altered its legal and policy-related frameworks. She formulates a normative, democratically minded framework for ‘public service broadcasting 2.0 (PSB 2.0)’ when considering how public service broadcasting has been expanded and redefined in the new media landscape. Brevini ultimately argues that PSB 2.0 and its reimagining of public service values are crucial in the 21st century – particularly if the internet is to embody the ideals of traditional, non-commercial broadcast television.

Amazon: Understanding a Global Communication Giant (2020)

Writing with Lukasz Swiatek, Brevini takes a political economy of media approach to understanding Amazon’s role in the global media landscape. She describes Amazon as a "digital lord" that is adapting the principles and practices of medieval feudalism for the Digital Age. Brevini posits that Amazon has built a "digital estate" in its 25 years of operation. Here, consumers are reduced to serfs who must sacrifice their privacy to access the products and services that Amazon offers. Brevini notes that Amazon's rise to prominence has been expedited by a contemporary manifestation of capitalism that favours market concentration and dominance, as well as the absence of regulatory frameworks that could redistribute wealth.

Is AI Good for the Planet? (2021)

In Is AI Good for the Planet?, Brevini investigates the environmental cost of AI applications. She argues that, while AI is frequently presented as a "magic wand" that will liberate humanity from the climate crisis, technological utopianism can obfuscate the materiality of technology. Accordingly, Brevini highlights four ways in which technologies, machines and infrastructures that use AI can exacerbate global warming.

1. Algorithms require significant computational power to be developed and trained to analyse and categorise data.
2. Substantial amounts of energy and water are required to cool down systems that power AI applications.
3. The minerals required to manufacture AI technologies produce a substantive quantity of waste; waste is also created during AI's transportation and disposal, which exacerbates pollution on an international scale.
4. AI assists oil and gas companies to become more "efficient" where the extraction of fossil fuels is concerned.

Brevini also explores Shoshana Zuboff’s notion of "surveillance capitalism", or the process by which personal data is collected and commodified by global corporations. Brevini states that the surveillance capitalism perpetuated by AI-equipped devices has heightened uberconsumerism and a mode of hyperconsumption that precipitates unsustainable energy demands.

Is AI Good for the Planet? was named ‘the best science book of the week’ by the English multidisciplinary science journal Nature.

== Selected bibliography ==
- Brevini, B. (2021) Is AI good for the planet? (Cambridge: Polity Press) ISBN 9781509547944
- Brevini, B and Swiatek, L. (2020) Amazon: Understanding a Global Communication Giant (New York: Routledge). ISBN 9780367364335
- Brevini, B. and Lewis. (eds) (2018) Climate Change and the Media (New York: Peter Lang). ISBN 9781433153952
- Brevini, B., Murdock, G. (eds) (2017) Carbon Capitalism and Communication: Confronting Climate Crisis (New York and London: Palgrave Macmillan). ISBN 9783319578767
- Brevini, B. (2013). Public Service Broadcasting Online: A Comparative European Policy Study of PSB 2.0. (Basingstoke, UK: Palgrave Macmillan). ISBN 9781137295095
- Brevini, B., Hintz, A., McCurdy, P. (eds) (2013). Beyond WikiLeaks: Implications for the Future of Communications, Journalism and Society (Basingstoke: Palgrave Macmillan). ISBN 9781137275738

== See also ==
- Artificial intelligence
- Climate crisis
- Data capitalism
- David Graeber
- Media reform
- Political economy
- Public Service broadcasting
- Shoshana Zuboff
- Surveillance capitalism
