= Network and service management taxonomy =

Classification system for research on computer networks

The network and service management taxonomy serves as a classification system for research on the management of computer networks and the services provided by computer networks. The taxonomy has been created and is being maintained by a joint effort of the Flamingo FP7 Project and the Committee of Network Operations and Management (CNOM) of the Communications Society (COMSOC) of the Institute of Electrical and Electronics Engineers (IEEE) and the Working Group 6.6 of the International Federation of Information Processing (IFIP). The taxonomy is organized into seven categories. The first four categories identify what kind of network/service/business aspect is being managed and which functional areas are covered. The remaining three categories identify which management paradigms, technologies, and methods are used.

== Category #1: Network Management ==
The first category called "Network Management" addresses the following question: What kind of network is being managed?

- IP networks
- Wireless and Cellular Networks
- Virtual networks
- Home networks
- Access networks
- Fog and Edge Networks
- Wide Area Networks
- Enterprise and campus networks
- Data center networks
- Industrial Networks
- Vehicular Networks
- Internet of Things and Sensor Networks
- Information-centric networks

== Category #2: Service Management ==
The second category called "Service Management" addresses the following question: What kind of service is being managed?

- Multimedia services
- Content delivery network
- Cloud computing services
- Internet connectivity and access services
- Internet of Things services
- Security Services
- Context-Aware Services
- Information technology services
- Service Assurance

== Category #3: Business Management ==
The third category called "Business Management" addresses the following question: How does management relate to business aspects?

- Economic Aspects
- Multi-Stakeholder Aspects
- Service Level Agreements
- Lifecycle Aspect
- Process and Workflow Aspects
- Legal Perspective
- Regulatory Perspective
- Privacy Aspects
- Organizational Aspect

== Category #4: Functional Areas ==
The fourth category "Functional Areas" addresses the following question: Which functional areas are covered? The functional areas originated from the ISO Telecommunications Management Network model and framework for network management.

- Fault management
- Configuration management
- Accounting management
- Performance management
- Security management

== Category #5: Management Paradigms ==
The fifth category "Management Paradigms" addresses the following question: Which paradigm is used to achieve network and service management?

- Centralized Management
- Hierarchical Management
- Distributed Management
- Federated Management
- Autonomic and cognitive management
- Policy- and Intent-Based Management
- Model-Driven Management
- Pro-active Management
- Energy-aware Management
- QoE-Centric Management

== Category #6: Technologies ==
The sixth category "Technologies" addresses the following question: Which technologies are used in the management process?

- Communication protocols
- Middleware
- Overlay networks
- Peer-to-Peer Networks
- Cloud Computing and Cloud Storage
- Data, Information and Semantic Models
- Information visualization
- Software-defined networking
- Network function virtualization
- Orchestration
- Operations and business support systems
- Control and Data Plane Programmability
- Distributed Ledger Technology

== Category #7: Methods ==
The seventh category "Methods" addresses the following question: What are the methods used to address the management problem?

- Mathematical logic and automated reasoning
- Optimization Theories
- Control theory
- Probability theory, stochastic processes, and queuing theory
- Artificial Intelligence and Machine Learning
- Evolutionary algorithms
- Economic theory and game theory
- Monitoring and measurements
- Data mining and (big) data analysis
- Computer simulation experiments
- Testbed Experimentation and Field Trials
- Software Engineering Methodologies

== See also ==
- ACM Computing Classification System
- Taxonomy (general)
