= A Declaration of the Independence of Cyberspace =

Essay regarding the lack of government over the Internet

- Presented: February 8, 1996
- Author: John Perry Barlow

Full text
- A Declaration of the Independence of Cyberspace at Wikisource

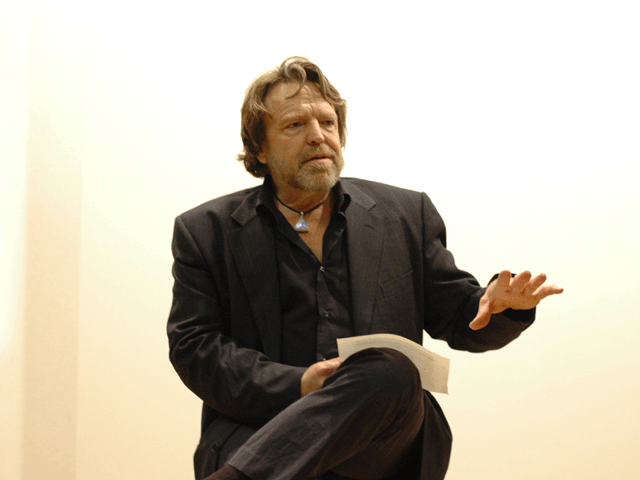
Barlow at the 10th Anniversary of his "Declaration"

"A Declaration of the Independence of Cyberspace" is a paper on the incompatibility of current governments with the rapidly growing Internet. Commissioned for the online project 24 Hours in Cyberspace, it was written by John Perry Barlow, a founder of the Electronic Frontier Foundation, and published online on February 8, 1996, from the World Economic Forum at Davos, Switzerland. It was written primarily in response to the passing into law of the Telecommunications Act of 1996 in the United States. In 2014, the Department of Records recorded and released audio and video content of Barlow reading the Declaration.

== Content ==
Governments of the Industrial World, you weary giants of flesh and steel, I come from Cyberspace, the new home of Mind. On behalf of the future, I ask you of the past to leave us alone. You are not welcome among us. You have no sovereignty where we gather.

— John Perry Barlow, "A Declaration of the Independence of Cyberspace"

The declaration sets out, in sixteen short paragraphs, a rebuttal to government of the Internet by any outside force, specifically the United States. It states that the United States did not have the consent of the governed to apply laws to the Internet, and that the Internet was outside any country's borders. Instead, the Internet was developing its own social contracts to determine how to handle its problems, based on the Golden Rule. It does this in language evocative of the United States Declaration of Independence and obliquely cites it in its final paragraphs. Although the paper mentions the Telecommunications Act, it also accuses China, Germany, France, Russia, Singapore, and Italy of stifling the Internet.

== Background ==
At the time the paper was written, Barlow had already written extensively on the Internet and its social and legal phenomena, as well as being a founding member of the Electronic Frontier Foundation. The work he was known best for previously, "The Economy of Ideas", published March 1994 in Wired magazine, also made allusions to Thomas Jefferson and some of the ideas he wrote about in his declaration.

== Critical response ==
Because of its subject matter, Barlow's work quickly became famous and widely distributed on the Internet. Within three months, an estimated 5,000 websites had copies of the declaration. At nine months, that number was estimated to be 40,000. To approach Barlow's vision of a self-governing Internet, the Cyberspace Law Institute set up a virtual magistrate, now hosted by the Chicago-Kent College of Law. Magistrates would be appointed by the institute and other legal groups to solve online disputes. The declaration has been criticized for internal inconsistencies. The declaration's assertion that 'cyberspace' is a place removed from the physical world has also been challenged by people who point to the fact that the Internet is always linked to its underlying geography.

Outside the Internet, the response was less positive. Larry Irving, the Assistant Secretary of Commerce, said that a lack of safeguards would "slow down the growth of what is likely to be a major boon for consumers and business". In the online magazine HotWired, one columnist referred to his document as simply "hogwash".

By 2002, the number of sites copying the declaration was estimated to have dropped to 20,000. In 2004, Barlow reflected on his 1990s work, specifically regarding his optimism. His response was that "we all get older and smarter". But a 2016 article in Wired insisted, "Barlow himself wants to be clear: He stands by his words just as much today." It quotes Barlow as saying, "The main thing I was declaring was that cyberspace is naturally immune to sovereignty and always would be. I believed that was true then, and I believe it’s true now."

== See also ==
- The Californian Ideology
- Commercialization of the Internet
- Hacker Manifesto
- Surveillance capitalism
