= Michael De Lisio =

American electrical engineer

Michael De Lisio is an electrical engineer with Wavestream Corporation in San Dimas, California, United States. He was named a Fellow of the Institute of Electrical and Electronics Engineers (IEEE) in 2014 for his leadership in, and commercialization of, high power microwave and millimeter-wave technologies.
