= Ifeoma Ajunwa =

Nigerian writer and law professor

Dr. Ifeoma Ajunwa
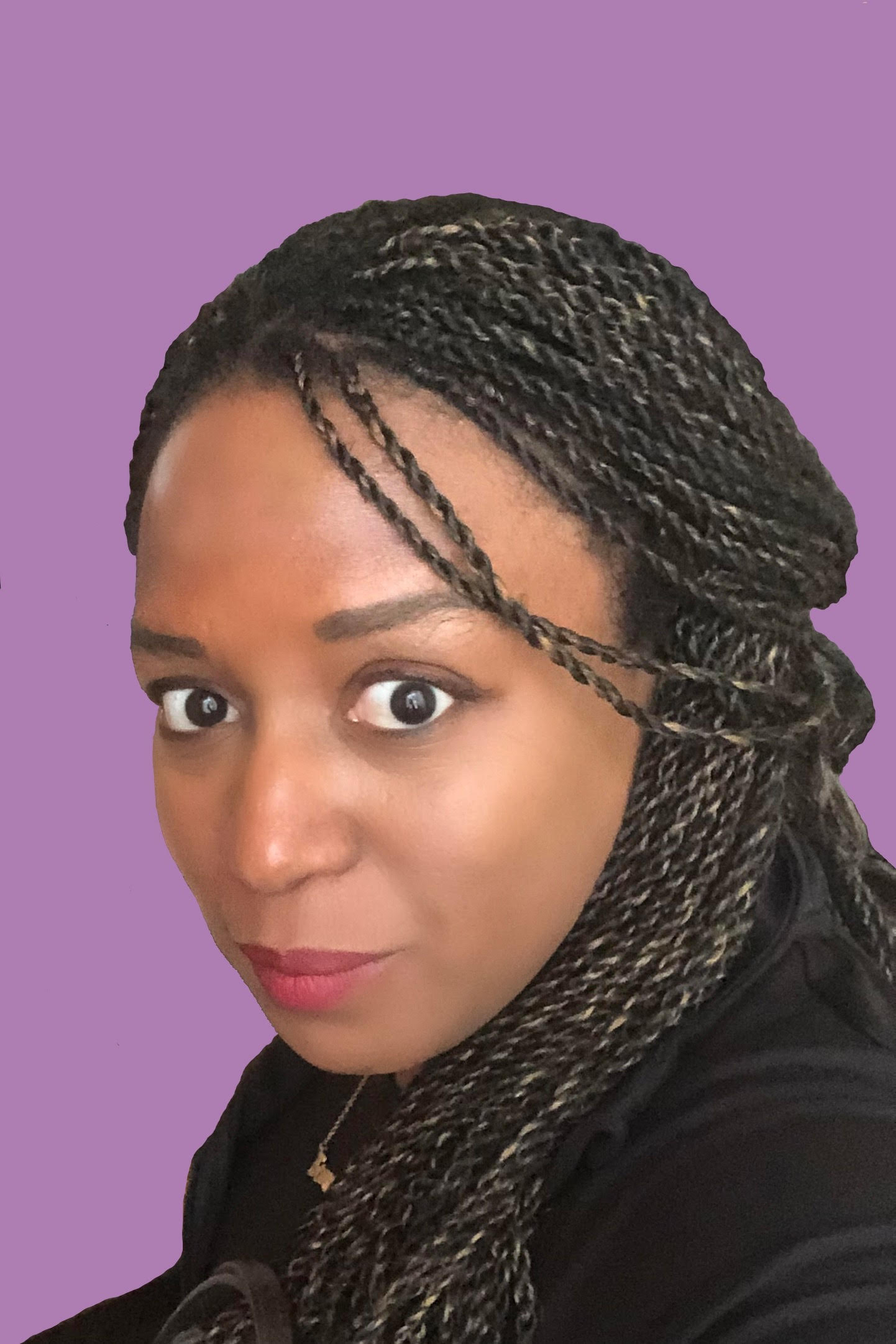
- Pronunciation: Ee-faw-mah Ah Juh-Wah (Igbo language)
- Born: Ifeoma Yvonne Ajunwa; 26 October 1980 (age 45); Nigeria
- Education: Yale Law School (LL.M) and Columbia University (Ph.D.)
- Occupations: writer, law professor, A.I. ethicists, board member, speaker
- Spouse: Ifeoma Ajunwa

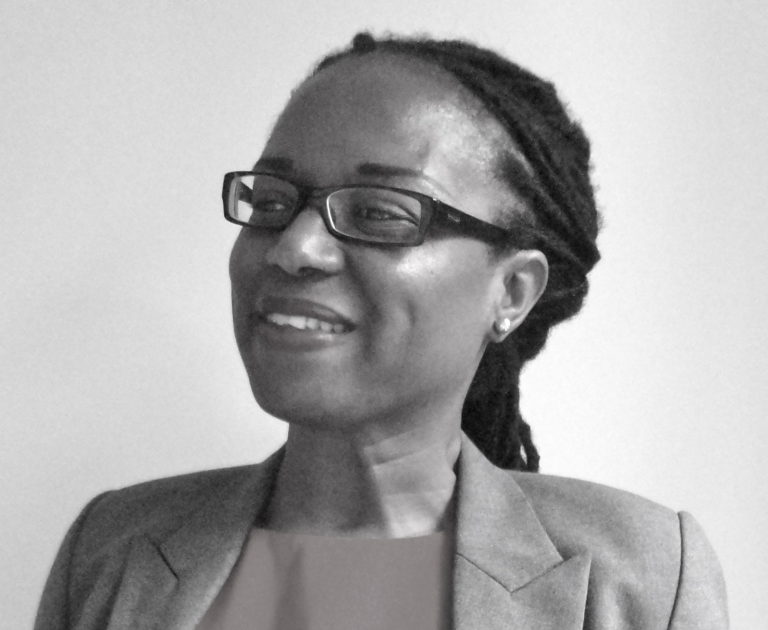
Ajunwa (2014)

Ifeoma Yvonne Ajunwa (born 26 October 1980) is a Nigerian-American writer, AI Ethics legal scholar, sociologist, and Asa Griggs Candler Professor of Law at Emory University School of Law where she is also Associate Dean and Founding Director of the A.I. and Future of Work Program. She was a Resident Fellow at Yale Law School's Information Society Project (ISP) and she has been a Faculty Associate at the Berkman Klein Center at Harvard Law School since 2017. From 2021–2022, she was a Fulbright Scholar to Nigeria where she studied the role of law for tech start-ups. She was previously an assistant professor of labor and employment law at Cornell University from 2017–2020, earning tenure there in 2020. She is an Elected Member of the American Law Institute and an Elected Life Fellow for the American Bar Foundation. She is the author of The Quantified Worker, published by Cambridge University Press in 2023.

== Education ==
Ajunwa is a graduate of Yale Law School (LLM) and Columbia University (M.Phil and Ph.D.) She also completed a Fellowship at Harvard University's Berkman Klein Center from 2016–2017. Ajunwa was a McNair Scholar as an undergraduate student, received an AAUW Selected Professions Fellowship in law school, and was a Paul F. Lazersfeld Fellow as a PhD student. Ajunwa's PhD thesis was advised by Josh Whitford.

== Career ==
Ajunwa is a writer, legal scholar, AI ethics researcher, and tenured professor of law. She has held several brief positions at different law schools and is currently serving as the Asa Griggs Candler Professor of Law at Emory Law School. Prior to that, Ajunwa was an assistant professor at the Cornell University School of Industrial and Labor Relations and an associate faculty member at Cornell Law School. She is a Faculty Associate at the Berkman Klein Center for Internet & Society at Harvard University, where previously she served as a Fellow from 2016–2017 and as a Teaching Fellow at Harvard Law School,. Ajunwa was awarded tenure by Cornell University on May 22, 2020.

Ajunwa's research interests are at the intersection of law and technology with a particular focus on the ethical governance of workplace technologies, race and tech, AI and Discrimination (especially in the region of Africa), corporate governance, DEI, health equity and privacy. Her research focus is also on diversity and inclusion in the labor market and the workplace. Her first book – The Quantified Worker – was published by Cambridge University Press in May 2023.

Ajunwa is an active keynote speaker, board member, advisor, and expert on AI and Ethics issues. She has testified before Congress and several governmental agencies. On January 20, 2023, she testified before the Equal Employment Opportunity Commission (EEOC) Meeting of January 31, 2023 – Navigating Employment Discrimination in AI and Automated Systems. On February 5, 2020, Ajunwa testified at a U.S. House of Representatives Committee on Education and Labor hearing on "The Future of Work: Protecting Workers' Civil Rights in the Digital Age". She discussed artificial intelligence-enabled racial bias in hiring practices and advocated for legislation protecting personal and genetic data privacy in the workplace. On May 6, 2018, Ajunwa was a TEDx Speaker at Cornell University where she presented a talk on the Controversies of Ethics and Technology in the Modern Workplace. At Cornell, Ajunwa has served as a board member on several advisory boards, including for the Institute for Africa Development and the Cornell Prison Education Program (CPEP). She is a founding board member of the Labor Tech Research Network and has served as advisory board member or consultant for several Fortune 500 tech companies.

== Awards and honors ==
- 2025 - Notable African Woman in Tech - AWIT
- 2023 - Elected Life Fellow of the American Bar Foundation
- 2023 - Elected Member of the American Law Institute
- 2023-2024- Resident Fellow, Yale Law's Information Society Project
- 2022 – 2023: Visiting Fellow, Yale Law School's Information Society Project
- 2021–2022: Fulbright Scholar (host country: Nigeria)
- 2020: Faculty Champion Award, Cornell University
- 2019: NSF CAREER Award
- 2018–2019: Keeton House Fellow, Cornell University
- 2018: Derrick A. Bell Award from the Association of American Law Schools
- 2016–2017: Fellow, Berkman Klein Center at Harvard University
- 2010–2015: Paul F. Lazersfeld Fellow, Columbia University
- 2006-2007: AAUW Selected Professions Fellowship
- 1999–2003: McNair Scholar, UC Davis

== Selected works ==
Law reviews:

1. A.I. and Captured Capital, 134 Yale L.J. Forum (2025)
2. Genetic Privacy, 100 Ind. L.J. 583 (2025) (with Forrest Briscoe)
3. Data Privacy by Contract, 45 Cardozo L.Rev. 1436 (2024) (with Austin Kamer)
4. Artificial Intelligence, Afrofuturism, and Economic Justice, 112 Geo L. J. 1267 (2024).
5. Automated Governance, 101 N.C. L. REV. 355 (2023)
6. Automated Video Interviewing as the New Phrenology, 36 Berkeley Tech. L.J. 1173 (2022)
7. An Auditing Imperative for Automated Hiring Systems, 34 Harv. J.L. & Tech. 1 (2021).
8. Protecting Workers' Civil Rights in the Digital Age, 21 N.C.J.L & Tech. 1 (2020).
9. The Paradox of Automation as Anti-Bias Intervention, 41 Cardozo. L. Rev.1671(2020).
10. Age Discrimination by Platforms, 40 Berkeley J. Emp. & Lab. L.1 (2019).
11. Algorithms at Work: Productivity Monitoring Applications and Wearable Technology, 63 St. Louis U. L.J. 21 (2019).Ife
12. Combatting Discrimination Against the Formerly Incarcerated in the Labor Market, 112 Nw. U. L. Rev. 1385 (2018). (with Professor Angela Onwuachi-Willig).
13. Limitless Worker Surveillance, 105 Cal. L. Rev. 736 ( 2017) (with Professors Jason Schultz and Kate Crawford).
14. Genetic Data and Civil Rights, 51 Harv. C.R.-C.L. L. Rev. 75 (2016).
15. The Modern Day Scarlet Letter, 83 Fordham L. Rev. 2999 (2015).
16. Genetic Testing Meets Big Data: Tort and Contract Law Issues, 75 Ohio St. L. J. 1225 (2014).
17. Bad Barrels: An Organizational-Based Analysis of Human Rights Abuses Within the American Carceral System, 17 U. PA. J. L. & Soc. Change 75 (2014).

Peer reviewed and other publications:

1. “Race, Labor, and the Future of Work,” Oxford Handbook of Race and Law in the United States, Eds. Devon Carbado, Emily Houh, and Khiara Bridges (invited Contribution) (forthcoming 2020)
2. “The Black Box at Work” Special Issue of Big Data and Society, Eds. Frank Pasquale and Benedetta Brevini (invited Contribution) (forthcoming 2020)
3. Evolving public views on the value of one’s DNA and expectations for genomic database governance: Results from a national survey Briscoe F, Ajunwa I, Gaddis A, McCormick J (2020) PLOS ONE 15(3): e0229044. https://doi.org/10.1371/journal.pone.0229044
4. “Platforms at Work: Automated Hiring Platforms and Other New Intermediaries in the Organization of the Workplace.” (with Daniel Greene) In Work and Labor in the Digital Age. Research in the Sociology of Work. Published online: 14 Jun 2019; 61–91.
5. Ajunwa, I. & Caplan, R. (2018). DNA Technology. SAGE Encyclopedia of Surveillance, Security and Privacy. (invited contribution).
6. “Health and Big Data: An Ethical Framework for Health Information Collection By Corporate Wellness Programs”, Journal of Law, Medicine, and Ethics, 44 (2016): 474–480 (with Kate Crawford and Joel Ford).

Op-eds/Media articles:

- Ifeoma Ajunwa, "Africa is Waiting for What You Promised," NYTimes, December 1, 2022
- Ifeoma Ajunwa, "The Power of Ketanji Brown Jackson's African Name," Slate, March 24, 2022
- Ifeoma Ajunwa, "Can We Trust Corporate Commitments to Racial Equity?", Forbes, February 23, 2021
- Ifeoma Ajunwa, Forrest Briscoe, "The Answer to a COVID-19 Vaccine May Lie in Our Genes, But ...", Scientific American, May 13, 2020
- Ifeoma Ajunwa, "Beware of Automated Hiring", The New York Times, October 8, 2019
- Ifeoma Ajunwa, "The Rise of Platform Authoritarianism", ACLU, April 10, 2018
- Ifeoma Ajunwa, "Facebook users aren’t the reason Facebook is in trouble now", Washington Post, March 23, 2018
- Ifeoma Ajunwa, "Corporate Surveillance Is Turning Human Workers Into Fungible Cogs", The Atlantic, May 19, 2017
- Ifeoma Ajunwa, "Workplace Wellness Programs Could Be Putting Your Health Data at Risk", Harvard Business Review, January 19, 2017
- Ifeoma Ajunwa, "A call to 'ban the box' on college applications", Washington Examiner, November 10, 2015
- Ifeoma Ajunwa, "The other big US Supreme Court decision we should be celebrating is one no one’s talking about", Quartz, June 29, 2015
- Ifeoma Ajunwa, "There’s No Guarantee of Anonymity", The New York Times, March 4, 2015
- Ifeoma Ajunwa, "Do You Know Where Your Health Data Is?", Huffington Post, February 13, 2015
- Ifeoma Ajunwa, "For Ebola Response – Think Infrastructure, Not Donations", Huffington Post, November 30, 2014
- Ifeoma Ajunwa, "West Africa Does Not Need Your Donations to Fight Ebola", Huffington Post, November 13, 2014
