= Autognostics =

Capacity for computer networks to be self-aware

Autognostics is a new paradigm that describes the capacity for computer networks to be self-aware. It is considered one of the major components of Autonomic Networking.

== Introduction ==
One of the most important characteristics of today's Internet that has contributed to its success is its basic design principle: a simple and transparent core with intelligence at the edges (the so-called "end-to-end principle"). Based on this principle, the network carries data without knowing the characteristics of that data (e.g., voice, video, etc.) - only the end-points have application-specific knowledge. If something goes wrong with the data, only the edge may be able to recognize that since it knows about the application and what the expected behavior is. The core has no information about what should happen with that data - it only forwards packets.

Although an effective and beneficial attribute, this design principle has also led to many of today's problems, limitations, and frustrations. Currently, it is almost impossible for most end-users to know why certain network-based applications do not work well and what they need to do to make it better. Also, network operators who interact with the core in low-level terms such as router configuration have problems expressing their high-level goals into low-level actions. In high-level terms, this may be summarized as a weak coupling between the network and application layers of the overall system.

As a consequence of the Internet end-to-end principle, the network performance experienced by a particular application is difficult to attribute based on the behavior of the individual elements. At any given moment, the measure of performance between any two points is typically unknown and applications must operate blindly. As a further consequence, changes to the configuration of given element, or changes in the end-to-end path, cannot easily be validated. Optimization and provisioning cannot then be automated except against only the simplest design specifications.

There is an increasing interest in Autonomic Networking research, and a strong conviction that an evolution from the current networking status quo is necessary. Although to date there have not been any practical implementations demonstrating the benefits of an effective autonomic networking paradigm, there seems to be a consensus as to the characteristics which such implementations would need to demonstrate. These specifically include continuous monitoring, identifying, diagnosing and fixing problems based on high-level policies and objectives.

Autognostics, as a major part of the autonomic networking concept, intends to bring networks to a new level of awareness and eliminate the lack of visibility which currently exists in today's networks.

== Definition ==
Autognostics is a new paradigm that describes the capacity for computer networks to be self-aware, in part and as a whole, and dynamically adapt to the applications running on them by autonomously monitoring, identifying, diagnosing, resolving issues, subsequently verifying that any remediation was successful, and reporting the impact with respect to the application's use (i.e., providing visibility into the changes to networks and their effects).

Although similar to the concept of network awareness, i.e., the capability of network devices and applications to be aware of network characteristics (see References section below), it is noteworthy that autognostics takes that concept one step further. The main difference is the auto part of autognostics, which entails that network devices are self-aware of network characteristics, and have the capability to adapt themselves as a result of continuous monitoring and diagnostics.

== Path to autognostics ==
Autognostics, or in other words deep self-knowledge, can be best described as the ability of a network to know itself and the applications that run on it. This knowledge is used to autonomously adapt to dynamic network and application conditions such as utilization, capacity, quality of service/application/user experience, etc.

In order to achieve autognosis, networks need a means to:

- Continuously monitor/test the network for application-specific performance
- Analyze the monitoring/test data to detect problems (e.g., performance degradation)
- Diagnose, identify and localize sources of degradation
- Automatically take actions to resolve problems via remediation/provisioning
- Verify the problems have been resolved (potentially rolling back changes if ineffective)
- Subsequently, continue to monitor/test for performance

== See also ==
- Autonomic Computing
- Autonomic Networking
- Autonomic Systems
