= Mark Farid =

English artist, producer, speaker, and cultural critic

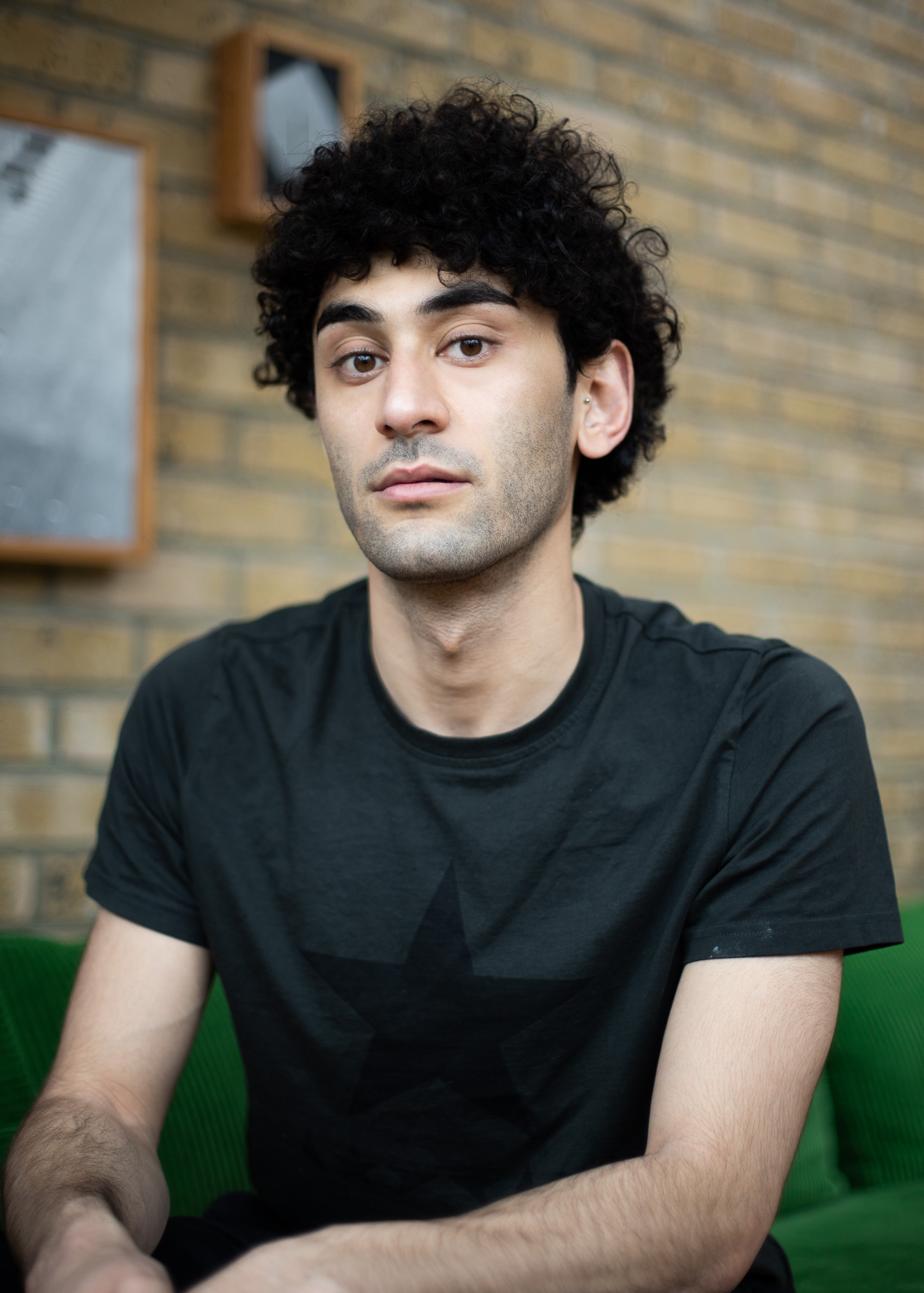
Mark Farid, December 2020

Mark Farid (born 1992) is an artist, producer, speaker, and cultural critic based in London. He is best known for his project Seeing I, which drew global media attention. He has also received press coverage for Data Shadow and Poisonous Antidote.

== Career ==
=== Data Shadow ===
Farid’s 2015 project Data Shadow was covered by several news publications. The solo exhibition, presented at All Saints Garden with the Cambridge Festival of Ideas, connected visitors' phones to a network which allowed their text messages and photos to be projected onto the walls of the installation. “The algorithm is trained to pick up flesh tones and faces,” Farid told The New Statesman. “We’re trying to find the most embarrassing and personal pictures we can.”

In conjunction with the exhibition Farid gave a talk at the festival titled "Anonymity is our only right, and that is why it must be destroyed," where he declared an intention to live without a digital footprint for six months, and gave away all his login details to the audience. This included all personal and professional email addresses, social media profiles, Apple ID, and (closed) online banking details. Reflecting on the experience in an article written a year later for The Telegraph, Farid explained the other measures he took and the effects they had on him :"What proved very apparent very quickly is that as a 23/24 year old living in London, there is no real choice over the usage of many digital and online platforms, let alone the choice of using a computer or mobile phone. Without them, my social, cultural, and financial life – and I’d go so far as to say my mental stability – were all affected in negative ways."

=== Poisonous Antidote ===
Poisonous Antidote ran online and at Gazelli Art House in London throughout September 2016. This project saw Farid broadcasting every facet of his online presence: all personal and professional emails, text messages, Skype and Facebook chats, web browsing, phone calls, and Twitter and Instagram feeds made up the content of the show. All of his pictures and videos appeared in real time, and his phones’ locations were updated every twenty minutes. The exhibition was a collaboration with the designer Vicente Gasco, who wrote an algorithm to 3D print each day’s data in the gallery. Over the course of the display a physical digital landscape grew beside the projected live newsfeeds and audio.

“Unlike Data Shadow,” wrote Farid, “where I gave up online privacy to gain personal privacy, only to realise social media is indispensable to contemporary life, Poisonous Antidote embraces the publicity of social media. Subsequently, I have found that I’m consciously and subconsciously changing my actions and behaviour to ensure I conform to society’s ideologies – that I am doing what I’m "meant" to be and feeling validated by the knowledge people can see this.”

In 2017 Farid was invited to give a TEDx talk on the Data Shadow and Poisonous Antidote projects, which took place in Warwick under the title “Data Privacy: Good or Bad?”

=== Seeing I ===
Seeing I was originally put on Kickstarter in November 2014. Within two days the project went viral and received worldwide media attention, with coverage in Sky News, Fox News, BBC, The Guardian, The Times of India, The Independent, Vice, and other stations and publications.

Farid’s original proposal for Seeing I was to spend a month living in virtual reality, on display in an art gallery while wearing a VR headset and noise-cancelling headphones. The feed would be provided by “the other,” a volunteer wearing a pair of spectacles transmitting a first-person perspective to Farid’s headset. Human contact would be limited to an hour’s daily psychiatric observation. The project aimed to discover the effects of total immersion in another person’s visual sense-world.

Every moment of Farid’s sleep pattern, diet, and sanitary schedule would be dictated by his counterpart, inverting the interactivity of VR games. Keith Stuart, writing in The Guardian, noted this difference and saw the project as addressing perennial philosophical questions: “Is the body a mere sensory vessel for the brain, or is identity inextricably linked to its physical manifestation?” In her feature for Vice, Chloe Cross described Seeing I as an attempt to “analyse how far our innate sense of self extends until we start to become a direct product of our surroundings and experiences. Can technology influence our mind to the extent that we forget who we really are? Or, in other words, will Mark slowly start to believe that he is his avatar?”

Professor Simon Baron-Cohen, of the University of Cambridge, has commented that "One might imagine various outcomes of this experiment: that he might become more empathic, being Other- rather than self-focused; that he might experience distorted perceptions and even delusions, given that his own brain is not receiving its normal input but instead is experiencing a kind of sensory deprivation; or that he might establish that the brain can in fact adapt relatively quickly (hours or days?) to a new reality, and then adapt back again at the end of the experiment, with no serious side-effects. Whatever the result, [it] will be ground-breaking and give rise to a raft of new hypotheses and methodologies for social psychology to explore more systematically and in larger samples.”

Other medical professionals have expressed concern for Farid’s mental health. Professor Barbara Sahakian, of the University of Cambridge and the Medical Research Council, said: “I am concerned about how such a long project which involves voyeurism on the part of Mark and also on the part of the public in regard to Mark will affect his mental health and wellbeing. It could be extremely disturbing and it is unclear whether any potential damage to Mark's mental health could be repaired.” Since its inception the timeframe of Farid’s immersion has been scaled down from twenty-eight days to seven.

A pilot of Seeing I took place at the 2019 Ars Electronica Digital Arts Festival. Over a week Farid spent nine continuous hours each day in VR, experiencing the life of a different person. Visitors to the exhibition were able to share what Farid was seeing using headsets in the gallery, whilst Farid was on constant display to the public.

Since 2019 it has been exhibited in several forms and venues and is currently scheduled for 2022, with the final date to be confirmed.

== Artistic and political views ==
The New Statesman summed up the experience of Data Shadow as “watching Farid commit privacy kamikaze.” Regarding the repeated public abuse that he has visited upon his own privacy and the point that he wishes to make by it, Farid has written that "Publishing every part of my online activity might appear to represent some dystopian future. But the truth is that most of us are doing exactly this right now – albeit in a more limited way. We are constantly self-publishing the details of our lives to technology companies, to governments, and to our networks on social media. The difference between you and I is of degree, not kind."

Farid opposes the intersection of state and corporate power under surveillance capitalism, and has commented that “the trouble about the internet is that it’s the perfect form of capitalism: completely privately owned, with a façade of being uncensored, free and democratic. But we are the commodity and our data is the currency.” He has criticised American lawmakers over the lack of Fourth Amendment protections for the personal data of non-US citizens and, more generally, the complacency that has followed the Edward Snowden revelations: “Our actions haven't changed, merely our skills with compartmentalising.” Farid has repeatedly called for technology to be more effectively regulated and for the UK government to reinstate the role of Minister of Technology (the position was last held in 1970, by the late Tony Benn).

In October 2020 Farid was interviewed by Michael Portillo for Times Radio. They discussed Seeing I, Farid’s previous career, and the role of the artist in the Twenty First Century. Farid subsequently appeared in Portillo’s BBC Two series Great British Railway Journeys, featuring in May 2021 as their contemporary surrealist artist.
