= Commercialization of the internet =

Running online services principally for financial gain

The commercialization of the internet encompasses the creation and management of online services principally for financial gain. It typically involves the increasing monetization of network services and consumer products mediated through the varied use of internet technologies. Common forms of internet commercialization include e-commerce (electronic commerce), electronic money, and advanced marketing techniques including personalized and targeted advertising. The effects of the commercialization of the internet are controversial, with benefits that simplify daily life and repercussions that challenge personal freedoms, including surveillance capitalism and data tracking. This began with the National Science Foundation funding supercomputing center and then universities being able to develop supercomputer sites for research and academic purposes.

With the growing population and demands of internet users, startups and their investors were encouraged to start profiting from the internet.

== Early history ==
The core idea of the web was outlined by Vannevar Bush in 1945 as interconnected networks of hyperlinked pages. The first attempt to materialize this vision was by Ted Nelson in 1965 all the way up to 1984, a decade before Netscape.

In the mid-1980s, the National Science Foundation, the backbone of the internet at the time, claimed that the internet was for research and not commerce. This strict allocation of funding was known as the "acceptable use policy." The NSF were firm believers that the internet would be thwarted and devalued if it were to open up to commercial interests.

However, simultaneously in April 1984 CompuServe's Consumer Information Service opened a new online shopping service called the Electronic Shopping Mall that allowed subscribers to buy from merchants including American Express, Sears, and over sixty other retailers.

=== Development of public networks ===
NSFNET, the National Science Foundation Network, was a three-layer network that acted as a backbone for much of the internet's infrastructure. Originally funded by the government, NSFNET was a big leap into the future which allowed networks to run smoothly. It allowed people to view pages without any cost to institutions. The allowance of users to access websites without having to pay to go on them would further develop the idea of being able to browse for items on the internet in the future. In 1992, interested entrepreneurs who believed there was money to be made from the internet petitioned Congress to get the government out of the way of NSFNET.

UUNET was the first company to sell commercial TCP/IP, first to government-approved corporations in November 1988 and then actively to the public starting in January 1990, albeit only to the NSFNET backbone with their approval.

Barry Shein's The World STD was selling dial-up internet on a legally questionable basis starting in late 1989 or early 1990, and then on an approved basis by 1992. He claims to be and is generally recognized as the first to ever think of selling dial-up internet access for money. The High Performance Computing Act of 1991 put U.S. government money behind the National Information Infrastructure, the National Research and Education Network (NREN), the National Center for Supercomputing Applications, and more.

== Internet becomes a true commercial medium ==
Although the internet infrastructure was mostly privately owned by 1993, the lack of security in the protocols made doing business and obtaining capital for commercial projects on the internet difficult. Additionally, the legality of internet business was still somewhat grey, though increasingly tolerated, which prevented large amounts of investment money from entering the medium. This changed with the NSFNET selling its assets in 1995 and the December 1994 release of Netscape Navigator, whose HTTPS secure protocol permitted relatively safe transfer of credit and debit card information.

This along with the advent of user-friendly Web browsers and ISP portals such as America Online, along with the disbanding of the NSFNET in 1995 is what led to the corporate internet and the dot com boom of the late 1990s.

1995 was a significant year for the concept of commercial internet service provider (ISP) markets due to two substantial events that took place: the Netscape initial public offering (IPO) and emergence of AT&T World Net. The Netscape IPO brought a lot of publicity to the new technology of the Web and the commercial opportunities for ISPs changed. At this point in time, ISPs started providing their traditional service, text-based applications such as e-mail, and trying to expand to another service, web applications. This became a time where ISPs were incentivized to expand and experiment with new types of services and business models. The entry of AT&T on the other hand created an internet access service that spread nationwide and gained one million customers due to its publicity and marketing. Despite this, AT&T did not dominate the commercial ISP markets, and in fact, led to the growth and emergence of other independent ISPs such as AOL, going against the predicted trend that commercial ISP markets would be dominated by only a few national ISP services.

The commercialization of the internet is going so well due to four main reasons. First, the academic model could easily migrate into business operations without requiring additional providers. Second, it is feasible for entrepreneurs to learn and gain benefits without too many technical and operational challenges. Third, customizing internet access is widespread through many different locations, circumstances, and users. Fourth, the internet access industry is still growing and provides a lot of opportunities for further research and practice.

=== Dot-com bubble ===
Between 1995 and 2000, internet start-ups encouraged investors to pour large sums of money into companies with ".com" in their business plan. When the commercialization of the internet became more acceptable and fast-paced, internet companies began to form rapidly with minute planning in order to get into what they thought would be easy money. It fueled by enthusiasm for all of the new opportunities and profits the internet had to offer, produced some successful companies such as Amazon.com.

This was shortly followed by the dot-com crash in 2001, wherein many of the same start-up companies failed due to a lack of concrete structure in their business plans, and investors cut off funding for the unprofitable companies. This led many people to believe that the internet was overhyped, but in reality this turning-point for the internet led to a revolutionary concept known as Web 2.0.

=== Early social media platforms ===
The introduction to social media started in 1994 when GeoCities was created by David Bohnett and John Rezner. GeoCities, being the first form of web hosting on the internet, let users utilize its functions to create "digital neighborhoods", which let everyone using the platform discuss different topics in depth with others involved in the same discussions. The concept of connecting with others through the internet in this manner that was established by GeoCities paved the way for the emergence of other social media platforms.

In December 1995, Classmates, a website created by Randy Conrads, enabled its users to create their own profiles, search through large yearbook databases, and add their high school friends to their friend list. Two years later, in 1997, Six Degrees, which is widely considered to be the first social networking website, included many of the popular features on Classmates, such as creating profiles and adding friends and school affiliations.

=== File-sharing computer services ===
Before the internet, sharing files was through dial-up BBS systems, floppy disks, tapes, magazines, CD's and other forms. However, with the creation of the internet and the development of new applications made file-sharing much easier. A prime example would be Napster, a music file-sharing application created by Shawn Fanning in 1999. The main idea of Napster was for people to share music files between each other, virtually, without the use of a physical copy. Napster was the reason why we have digital forms of music, TV-shows, and movies. Napster forced production and music companies to make digital forms of their media and streaming services.

File-sharing computer services started to become more accessible to users due to applications like BitTorrent. The creation of BitTorrent brought peer to peer sharing and users were able to use the built-in search engine to find media they would like to view. BitTorrent's traffic made up 53% of all peer to peer traffic in 2004 even though it was a file-download protocol. Since BitTorrent was a file- download protocol, it had to rely on websites like The Pirate's Bay for users to share their media onto the website and then users were allowed to download media onto their computers through BitTorrent.

== Web 2.0 and the rise of social media ==
=== Web 2.0 ===
The bursting of the Dot-Com Bubble in 2001 acted as an unforeseen gateway for the transition from Web 1.0 to Web 2.0 by 2004. A conference between Tim O'Reilly with O'Reilly Media and MediaLive International coined the term "Web 2.0". This conference became an annual "Web 2.0 Summit" in San Francisco, where the idea was developed gradually from 2004 to 2011. Web 2.0 included data that existed prior within Web 1.0 with improved data management and increased interaction. Web 2.0 was majorly delivered by AdobeFlash, Ajax, RSS, Eclipse, JavaScript, Microsoft Silverlight, etc.

Some key characteristics of Web 2.0 included:

- Development of user friendly advertising i.e. banners and pop-up ads developed by Google and Overture
- A platform for the people by the people
- Users now able to add value to existing applications
- Transition from static to dynamic HTML serving web applications to users
- User-generated content
- Growth of social media
- Transition from passive viewing to co-authoring
- The transition from read-only web to read-write web.

While using the applications of Web 2.0, users unknowingly had their user data aggregated: collected and linked together for what was already becoming commercial purposes. Sites used built-in APIs (Application Programming Interfaces) to connect with external sources invisible to the user. Thanks to the newfound connection between platform and user, applications could now access data and exchange it with other software.

Web 2.0 catapulted the marketing industry into a completely uncharted territory. With encouraged user integration, there were now enhanced retail opportunities, increased marketing visibility, and the ability for business to interact with customers. In November 2005, Google came out with Google Analytics which allows sellers to track buyers' referrals, advertisements, search engines, and e-mail promotions. All of these characteristics of Web 2.0 combined gave way to "viral marketing": a marketing technique that was all over the internet, all the time. Business could now promote products or services to larger audiences wherever, and however they chose to.

==== Personalization on the internet ====
The commercialization of the internet has allowed personalized experiences for consumers, which in turn provides companies and marketers with data that helps them make inferences about the behavioral patterns and actions of the consumer. Personalization of the internet follows a typical cycle of product purchases, which includes steps such as personalized searches, personalized recommendations, and personalized price and promotions. Companies tailor products they think the consumer would like based on their behavior and transactions. This make people feel like someone is listening to their needs.

===== Clickstream =====
Clickstream technology is what is used in order to infer information about the user, mainly for online shopping sites. Clickstream is the path that consumers take on the website to its destination. It includes times stamps and the pages that were visited. Although clickstream may be associated with online shopping and advertising, it can also be used to simply extend certain sites to more people. It is important to understand a consumer's pattern on a certain site in order to tailor information to their liking. Not only does this increase traffic flow to a specific site, but it also increases connections with customers which makes it more engaging.

===== Personalized email marketing =====
Emails can also help in the process of personalizing the internet. Email personalization means that companies have to learn about your likes and dislikes in order to send you emails that carry important weight to you rather than sending every user the same email. Because of email personalization, it has been proven to increase interest in the site. A form of email personalization that is commonly seen are those that remind the user that they still have products in their cart that have not been purchased yet. This can remind them of something that they forgot or this can increase their interest even further and ultimately can lead to them purchasing the product.

==== Advertising on the internet ====
Targeted advertising can take on many different forms, across numerous platforms, in order to effectively target range of market subgroups. Often seen as a precursor to the internet, the first spam email was sent on May 3, 1978, originally used as "a highly secure medium for information flow between universities and research centers," beginning with UCLA, UC Santa Barbara, University of Utah, and Stanford Research Institute. The earliest widespread spam email was sent on April 13, 1994, by Martha Siegel and Laurence Canter, who were among the first to post on Usenet in order to advertise their law firm, claiming they would in turn be able to help people enter the green-card lottery. Hotwired magazine then coined the term "banner advertising" in October 1994, with AT&T being one of the first companies to purchase a banner ad.

===== Search engine marketing =====
Search engine marketing is something that is seen every time someone searches for a product on a search engine. Sometimes referred to as SEM, search engine marketing is a strategy in marketing when ads appear above or below relevant search results. These ads are usually sponsored or paid for, also known as CPC, cost-per-click. Commonly seen on popular search engines such as Google and Bing, these ads don't just stop at search engines, but extend to their partner sites, such as Yahoo, YouTube, and shopping. Similar to SEM, search engine optimization (SEO) improves visibility of their page. Instead of paying for ads, they have to appeal to search engines in order for them to rank them higher on specific searches.

===== Banner ads =====
Banner ads are slim ads that can appear vertically, horizontally, and in between texts. They are usually filled with pictures and few words rather than all words. Usually clickable, when a user clicks on these banners, they lead to another page which displays the full site. Usually placed in high-traffic areas, companies have to bid for their ad to be placed their instead of simply paying for the spot. However, this is not done by humans but rather by a program that does it without human assistance. Unlike personalization, banner ads can reach everyone which can spark interest in new people rather than staying within one group of consumer. However, it can also show for those that are interested in a specific product. Ultimately, banner ads will not decrease but only increase attraction towards their site.

=== Facebook ===
Facebook was founded by Mark Zuckerberg in 2004 and was originally only available to Harvard students as an interactive college student network, but it soon expanded to many other college campuses throughout the United States. By September 2006, Facebook expanded outside of just educational institutions and became available to any person with a registered email address. After Sean Parker, the founder of Napster, became the president of Facebook, Mark Zuckerberg was introduced to Peter Thiel, a venture capitalist and one of the founders of PayPal, which resulted in Thiel investing $500,000 into Facebook, establishing Facebook as an up-and-coming company that would interest other investors.

In April 2004, Facebook's ad sales effort, which was led by co-founder Eduardo Saverin, was an example of an early commercial use of social media. The ad rates were as low as $1 per 1,000 impressions and Facebook offered its services to companies who wanted to advertise themselves through this platform. Facebook enabled companies to create targeted advertisements based on a variety of consumer-related factors such as college/university, degree type, sexual orientation, age, personal interests, and political views. Companies were also provided with an up-to-the-minute ad performance tracking service and had rates that differed depending on the type of advertisement (run-of-site ads, targeted ads, etc.).

=== Twitter ===
Twitter emerged from Odeo, a podcasting venture that was launched in 2004 and founded by Evan Williams and Noah Glass. After Apple's announcement in 2005 that they would add podcasts to iTunes, the leaders of Odeo wanted to take the company in a new direction since they believed that they could not compete with Apple in regards to podcasts. Engineer Jack Dorsey suggested that the company could provide a short message service (SMS) that enables friends to share short blog-like updates to one another. Using Dorsey's idea, in 2006, Twitter was officially launched.

Throughout Twitter's lifespan, there have been various examples of it being used for commercial purposes. Twitter's implementation of hashtags allows companies to go viral on the platform and gain a significant amount of attention for launching a successful hashtag. Nike's "Dream Big" campaign used the hashtag "#justdoit" to promote their message, which focused on the stories of famous athletes who became successful after not letting fear stop them from achieving their goals in order to motivate their followers to chase their own dreams. The success and traction of Nike's "Dream Big" campaign is an example of how Twitter as a platform was used to benefit companies whose goal was to increase their visibility to a large number of people using Twitter. Viral marketing is also present on Twitter as companies use their posts to touch upon current issues that are being heavily discussed. This method of using Twitter to keep their brands up to date with the trends creates more opportunities for companies to interact with users and potential buyers in ways that are relevant to them.

== The emergence of the mobile internet ==
Preceded modern cellular mobile form of telephony technology was the mobile radio telephone systems, referred to as the zero generation (0G or pre-cellular) systems, later succeeded by 1G. The world's first commercial 1G mobile network, launched in 1979 by Nippon Telegraph and Telephone (NTT), was made available to the citizens of Tokyo, Japan. Following Japan, other countries started attaining 1G coverage. Although cellphone prototypes followed the launch of 1G, it wasn't until 1983 that Motorola rolled out to the public the first commercially available cellphone.

Replacing 1G's analog technology, telecommunication standards is 2G, digital telecommunications. 2G cellar networks were first commercially launched on the Global System for Mobile Communications (GSM) standard in Finland in 1991. 2G made significant changes, advancing the basis of 1G's voice calls through improved quality and download speed, also introducing digitally encrypted phone calls (although not in entirety, it allowed for conversations held between the mobile phone and the cellular base station). 2G also marked the start of data services for mobile devices and enables access to media content. The introduction of 2G's data transferring abilities, text messages (SMS) and multimedia messages (MMS), changed how people communicate. As methods of communications shifted, the 2G network led to the smartphones' massive adoption. With the demand increase for data and connectivity, the 2G network was superseded by 3G, followed by 4G, and later on 5G.

=== 3G Technology ===
The first commercial launch of 3G technology was deployed for the public by NTT Docomo in Japan in 2001. 3G networks implemented new technology and protocols that offered significantly faster data transfer capabilities, which improved connectivity, call quality, and connection speed, including 30 times higher rates (3 Mbps) on average than that of 2G (0.1 Mbit/s). When 3G infrastructure launched more broadly in 2002, its networks continued to develop in not only quality and speed but also range and volume, setting the early commercial foundations of the mobile internet.

Smartphones soon gained popularity quickly as 3G marked the first for a cellular communications network to broaden and improve a range of features, kick-starting the transition to widespread usage of cellular networks. In 2002, BlackBerry launched its first mobile device (BlackBerry 5810), offering a full keyboard, advanced security, and internet access. The company characterized it as a "breakthrough in wireless convergence," and touted the wireless handheld device for mobile services ranging from email delivery and SMS, to streaming and web browsing, to graphical interfaces and utility features. Later, the BlackBerry 5810 was replaced by more advanced models iteratively produced by both Blackberry and their field competitors.

In 2007, Apple released the company's first-ever phone, iPhone 2G (also known as iPhone 1 or the original iPhone). At Macworld 2007, Steve Jobs presented the phone as the one device allowing capabilities of "an iPod, a phone, and an internet communicator." Following the iPhone 2G, the iPhone 3G (also known as iPhone 2) was introduced along with the company's developed App Store. The Apple-developed and maintained app store platform utilizes the 3G network, providing access to mobile applications on the company's operations systems. Jointly, the introduction of the App Store marketplace and the maturation of the iPhone established the idea that an electronic device need not be rigid functionally. The device contributed to the transition to mobile as it speedily evolved into a dominant platform of the mobile web, making available to the public increasing access to apps and data.

=== 4G Technology ===
4G, different from previous networks designed primarily for voice communication (2G and 3G), is the first network designed specifically for data transmission, driven by order for quicker data and expansion of network capabilities. The network observes the start of today's standard services, offering faster data access on mobile phones.

Some improvements and applications brought about by LTE and 4G include:

- Streaming quality (higher resolution and better audio quality)
- Upload and download rates
- Video calls
- More on-the-go entertainment, including influence on social media platforms and gaming services
- Wearable tech products

Eliminating the previous hold, set by limited data transmission, the network contributed to advanced mobile applications and the applications' unique features. Network users became able to share high-resolution images and videos from their mobile devices, causing social media and gaming platforms to shift and create features that take advantage of the network's new effects. While progress in the 4G network helped with further improvement of data transferring speeds, the network had reached its capacity, and the rapidly releasing new mobile and wearable products require faster networks.

5G Technology

At the heart of 5G network is 3GPP (3rd Generation Partnership Project), which invented the air interface and service layer design for 5G. 3GPP encompasses infrastructure vendors, device manufacturers, as well as network and service providers.

The initial idea of 5G network was to connect all machines, objects, and devices together virtually. No specific company owns 5G, but many different companies contribute to bringing it to its full potential.

5G works by using OFDM (orthogonal frequency-division multiplexing), which sends digital signals across channels to properly interconnect various devices. With wider bandwidth, 5G has larger capacity and lower latency than its predecessors.

From 2013 to 2016, companies such as Verizon, Samsung, Google, Bt, Nokia and others began to develop their own versions of 5G networks including Google's Skybender. Global operators began launching new 5G networks in 2019. By 2020, 5G networks were integrated into the majority of mobile phones as well as in-home modems.

Some characteristics and effects of 5G network:

- Speeds twice as fast as 4G
- Ability to download movies within seconds
- Larger frequencies which allow for faster data travel with less clutter
- Mobile phone becomes the dominant platform for video consumption
- Mass roll-out and quality improvement of virtual reality

Facebook has taken advantage of the prevail of 5G networks. Facebook took over a 5G company, Inovi, and partnered with a startup company, Common Networks, to help power home use of 5G.

Facebook had already invested in Oculus, with the idea that Virtual Reality and 5G will innovate social media usage. Mark Zuckerberg and Facebook have already incorporated VR into applications such as VR chat, Facebook spaces, and Oculus Home. Users can communicate with one another through avatars and specialized 3D audio technology, play virtual games, watch content together, and visit virtual space stations.

== E-commerce ==
E-commerce stands for electronic commerce and pertains to buying and trading goods through electronic mediums. This enabled shoppers to do their online shopping at home instead of going into physical stores. With the development and better access to the internet, e-commerce allowed larger and smaller businesses to grow at a faster rate and it cuts down expenses when it comes down to retail shopping.

=== History and development of e-commerce ===
The idea of e-commerce can be traced back to the 1960s with the development of the Electronic Data Interchange, enabling data exchange through digital transactions without human interaction. Early forms of e-commerce date to Michael Aldrich, when in 1979 he connected a TV to a transaction processing computer using a telephone, calling it teleshopping.

In 1992, Book Stacks Unlimited became the first store to host an e-commerce site, as additional companies like Dell followed suit with the adoption related e-commerce models. The development of the Secure Socket Layers, an encryption certificate, provided better security for data transmission over the internet. This gave online shoppers less hesitations and concerns while shopping online.

=== Impact on the retail industry ===
E-commerce was an stepping stone into cutting down costs for customers and for businesses to bring in more profit.

A traditional business selling shirts would have to go through warehouses and distributors before the product ends up in the store, which all bring additional costs to the business.

The access to the internet allowed for individuals to do their shopping on their computers or phones. The change that E-commerce brought to the shopping industry had negative impacts on the retail section. Business would close down their stores to cut costs on selling their product which lead to employees losing their jobs since businesses found it easier and cheaper to sell their products online. With the decline in physical retail stores, customers aren't able to go to a store and try the product before buying it; this brought a bigger hassle to customers where their new item doesn't fit or work and they would have to ship it back.

=== Role of e-commerce in 21st century ===
Amazon.com, created by Jeff Bezos, started out as a bookstore and comparing it to today, Amazon.com offers different products for users when using their website. Amazon.com is known for their Prime services, 2-day delivery, which attracted shoppers since they were able to get different items delivered to their front door step. In some cases, groceries and household supplies would also be able to delivered through Amazon.com making it easy for shoppers due to the fact they wouldn't have to leave their homes.

Brands like Nike and Adidas would promote their Cyber Monday deals to encourage people to buy their products online without having to deal with the long lines when shopping during Black Friday.

Smaller businesses were able to sell their products online and be able to promote it using internet advertisements.

The creation of applications like Shopify allowed users to develop their own website to sell their product and build a reputable brand assisted by tutorials and instructions. The developments of PayPal and other payment methods gave customers an easier and faster way of paying by signing into their accounts.

5G and Online Shopping

Augmented reality, virtual reality, and 5G networks are used in online shopping. Retailers use AR for virtual product presentations. Facebook has tested AR advertisements on its platform and has collaborated with businesses to use AR on Facebook Messenger since 2018. These advertisements include "tap and try" features for product demonstration.

The use of 5G allows brands to utilize big data for hyper-personalized advertising. With consumers using the internet as often as they do, high amounts of data allow brands to micro-segment their target audiences; this is a form of digital marketing heretofore unseen.

== Internet privacy ==
=== NSA disclosures ===
In 2013, Edward Snowden, a former intelligence contractor for Booz Allen Hamilton in Hawaii, leaked classified documents from the National Security Agency (NSA) to journalists Glenn Greenwald and Laura Poitras. These documents revealed information including the fact that the NSA collected millions of Verizon customers' telephone records and used a program called Prism to access data from internet companies such as Google and Facebook. When people became more aware of the mass surveillance being done by the NSA, Americans became more disapproving of the government's surveillance program, which served as an anti-terrorism effort, and the majority of Americans started to believe that having control of who is able to access their personal and private information is important. Internet privacy became an important concept for companies when it came to easing their customers due to the information Snowden leaked. Facebook is an example of one of these companies, which was shown during Facebook's F8 developer conference in 2019, where Zuckerberg stated "The future is private...Over time, I believe that a private social platform will be even more important to our lives than our digital town squares. So today, we’re going to start talking about what this could look like as a product, what it means to have your social experience be more intimate, and how we need to change the way we run this company in order to build this.”

=== Facebook scandal ===
In 2018, the Cambridge Analytica group brought to attention what Facebook was doing with their user's information. This scandal was based around the election and how Facebook had harvested their data from their users and use their information for advertisement. A well known social media page was sued for personal data breach. This case became argued by the fact that data was being taken without consent, which meant failure to comply with legal obligations under the Data Protection Act 1998.

The Cambridge Analytica scandal against Facebook didn't change Facebook but the way individuals see social media applications. The Cambridge Analytica wanted Facebook to fix the privacy issues within their application, however Facebook wasn't taking the steps that the Cambridge Analytica wanted Facebook to take. However, this scandal opened the eyes of Facebook users because users saw what was being done with their data that they give to Facebook.

== See also ==
- 3G
- 4G
- 5G
- A Declaration of the Independence of Cyberspace
- Big data
- Data mining
- Digital Marketing
- Dot com Boom
- Dot com Crash
- E-commerce
- History of the internet
- History of the World Wide Web § 1996–1998: Commercialization of the Web
- Information economics
- Internet Privacy
- National Science Foundation
- Online advertising
- Personalized marketing
- Social Media Marketing
- Surveillance capitalism
- Targeted advertising
- The Wealth of Networks
- Web 2.0
- Who Owns the Future?
