= Resisting AI =

2022 non-fiction book by Dan McQuillan

Resisting AI: An Anti-fascist Approach to Artificial Intelligence
- Author: Dan McQuillan
- Language: English
- Subjects: Artificial intelligence
- Publisher: Bristol University Press
- Publication date: 2022
- Pages: 190
- ISBN: 978-1529213508

Resisting AI: An Anti-fascist Approach to Artificial Intelligence is a book on artificial intelligence (AI) by Dan McQuillan, published in 2022 by Bristol University Press.

== Content ==
Resisting AI is an extended essay that contrasts optimistic visions about AI's potential by arguing that AI may best be seen as a continuation and reinforcement of bureaucratic forms of discrimination and violence, ultimately fostering authoritarian outcomes. For McQuillan, AI's promise of objective calculability is antithetical to an egalitarian and just society. McQuillan uses the expression "AI violence" to describe how – based on opaque algorithms – various actors can discriminate against categories of people in accessing jobs, loans, medical care, and other benefits.

The book suggests that AI has a political resonance with soft eugenic approaches to the valuation of life by modern welfare states, and that AI exhibits eugenic features in its underlying logic, as well as in its technical operations. The parallel is with historical eugenicists achieving saving to the state by sterilizing defectives so the state would not have to care for their offspring.

The analysis of McQuillan goes beyond the known critique of AI systems fostering precarious labour markets, addressing "necropolitics", the politics of who is entitled to live, and who to die. Although McQuillan offers a brief history of machine learning at the beginning of the book – with its need for "hidden and undercompensated labour", he is concerned more with the social impacts of AI rather than with its technical aspects. McQuillan sees AI as the continuation of existing bureaucratic systems that already marginalize vulnerable groups – aggravated by the fact that AI systems trained on existing data are likely to reinforce existing discriminations, e.g. in attempting to optimize welfare distribution based on existing data patterns, ultimately creating a system of "self-reinforcing social profiling".

In elaborating on the continuation between existing bureaucratic violence and AI, McQuillan connects to Hannah Arendt's concept of the thoughtless bureaucrat in Eichmann in Jerusalem: A Report on the Banality of Evil, which now becomes the algorithm that, lacking intent, cannot be accountable, and is thus endowed with an "algorithmic thoughtlessness".

McQuillan defends the "fascist" in the title of the work by arguing that while not all AI is fascist, this emerging technology of control may end up being deployed by fascist or authoritarian regimes. For McQuillan, AI can support the diffusion of states of exception, as a technology impossible to properly regulate and a mechanism for multiplying exceptions more widely. An example of a scenario where AI systems of surveillance could bring discrimination to a new high is the initiative to create LGBT-free zones in Poland.

Skeptical of ethical regulations to control the technology, McQuillan suggests people's councils and workers' councils, and other forms of citizens' agency to resist AI. A chapter titled "Post-Machine Learning" makes an appeal for resistance via currents of thought from feminist science (standpoint theory), post-normal science (extended peer communities), and new materialism; McQuillan encourages the reader to question the meaning of "objectivity" and calls for the necessity of alternative ways of knowing. Among the virtuous examples of resistance – possibly to be adopted by the AI workers themselves – McQuillan notes the Lucas Plan of the workers of Lucas Aerospace Corporation, in which a workforce declared redundant took control, reorienting the enterprise toward useful products.

McQuillan advocates for what he calls decomputing, an opposition to the sweeping application and expansion of artificial intelligence. Similar to degrowth, the approach criticizes AI as an outgrowth of the systemic issues within capitalist systems. McQuillan argues that a different future is possible, in which distance between people is reduced rather than increased through AI intermediaries.

The work of McQuillan

warns against "watered-down forms of engagement" with AI, such as citizen juries, which superficially look like democratic deliberation but may actually obscure important decisions about AI that are outside the purview of the engagement situation (McQuillan 2022, 128).

In an interview about the book, McQuillan describes himself as an "AI abolitionist".

== Reception ==
The book has been praised for how it "masterfully disassembles AI as an epistemological, social, and political paradigm". On the critical side, a review in the academic journal Justice, Power and Resistance took exception to the "nightmarish visions of Big Brother" offered by McQuillan, and argued that while many elements of AI may pose concern, a critique should not be based on a caricature of what AI is, concluding that McQuillan's work is "less of a theory and more of a Manifesto". Another review notes "a disconnect between the technical aspects of AI and the socio-political analysis McQuillan provides."

Although the book was published before the ChatGPT and large language model debate heated up, the book has not lost relevance to the AI discussion. It is noted for suggesting a link between beliefs in artificial intelligence and beliefs in a racialised and gendered visions of intelligence overall, whereby a certain type of rational, measurable intelligence is privileged, leading to "historical notions of hierarchies of being".

The blog Reboot praised McQuillan for offering a theory of harm of AI (why AI could end up hurting people and society) that does not just encourage tackling in isolation specific predicted problems with AI-centric systems: bias, non-inclusiveness, exploitativeness, environmental destructiveness, opacity, and non-contestability.

For educational policies could also look at AI following the reading of McQuillan:

In his book Resisting AI, Dan McQuillan argues that "When we're thinking about the actuality of AI, we can't separate the calculations in the code from the social context of its application" .... McQuillan's particular concern is how many contemporary applications of AI are amplifying existing inequalities and injustices as well as deepening social divisions and instabilities. His book makes a powerful case for anticipating these effects and actively resisting them for the good of societies.

Videos and podcasts with an interest in AI and emerging technology have discussed the book.

== See also ==
- Shoshana Zuboff
- Surveillance capitalism
- Weapons of Math Destruction
- Alain Supiot
