= The Age of Surveillance Capitalism =

2019 book by Shoshana Zuboff

- Front cover
- Author: Shoshana Zuboff
- Subject: Politics, cybersecurity
- Publisher: Profile Books
- Publication date: October 4, 2018 (Germany)
- Pages: 704
- ISBN: 9781781256855

The Age of Surveillance Capitalism: The Fight for a Human Future at the New Frontier of Power is a 2018 non-fiction book by Shoshana Zuboff which looks at the development of digital companies like Google and Meta, and suggests that their business models represent a new form of capitalist accumulation that she calls "surveillance capitalism".

While industrial capitalism exploited and controlled nature with devastating consequences, surveillance capitalism exploits and controls human nature with a totalitarian order as the endpoint of the development.

== Premise ==
Zuboff states that surveillance capitalism "unilaterally claims human experience as free raw material for translation into behavioural data [which] are declared as a proprietary behavioural surplus, fed into advanced manufacturing processes known as 'machine intelligence', and fabricated into prediction products that anticipate what you will do now, soon, and later." She states that these new capitalist products "are traded in a new kind of marketplace that I call behavioural futures markets."

In a capitalist society, information, such as a user's likes and dislikes gathered when accessing a platform like Facebook, or from any other kind of sensor that serves as an internet touch point to data-stream, is information that can be used by that company to better the experience of a user by feeding them information that data obtained from their previous activity would have shown them to be interested in. It can also infer many things about the individual that extend far beyond the terms and conditions of use. This in many ways can be done through the use of an algorithm that analyses information.

The danger of surveillance capitalism is that platforms and tech companies claim ownership of private information because it is free for them to access, claiming private experience as 'raw material' for data factories. There is very little supervision or actual laws by governments and users themselves. Because of this, there has been backlash on how these companies have used the information gathered. For example, Google, which is said to be "the pioneer of surveillance capitalism" introduced a feature that used "commercial models ... discovered by people in a time and place". This means that not only are commercials being specifically targeted to you through your phone, but now work hand in hand with your environment and habits such as being shown an advertisement of a local bar when walking around downtown in the evening. She claims that Pokémon Go was not designed to be a game, but to explore a new strategy: move targeted ads into the physical domain, bringing the user to some store or restaurant by foot and having advertisers pay for users presence. Advertising attempts this technical and specific can easily have an impact on one's decision-making process in the activities they choose and in political decisions. Thus the idea that these companies seemingly go unchecked whilst having the power to observe and control thinking is one of the many reasons tech companies such as Google themselves are under so much scrutiny and criticism.

Furthermore, Zuboff writes, the freedom allotted to tech companies comes from the idea that "surveillance capitalism does not abandon established capitalist 'laws' such as competitive production, profit maximization, productivity and growth", as they are principles any business in a capitalistic society should aim to excel in, in order to be competitive. Zuboff claims in an article that "new logic accumulation ... introduces its own laws of motion". In other words, this is a new phenomenon in capitalistic operations that should be treated as such and be instilled with its own specific restrictions and limitations. Lastly, as invasive as platforms have been in terms of accumulating information, they have also led to what is now called a "sharing economy", Van Dijck (2018) in which digital information can be obtained by individuals carrying out their own surveillance capitalism through the aid of platforms themselves. Thus "individuals can greatly benefit from this transformation because it empowers them to set up business", Van Dijck (2018). Small businesses will also benefit in potentially growing faster than they would have without knowing consumer demands and wants but would need to pay corporations for access to knowledge. This leaves surveillance capitalism as an exceptionally useful tool for businesses, but also an invasion of privacy to users who do not want their private experience to be owned by a company.

== Reception ==
The Financial Times called the book a "masterwork of original thinking and research". The New Yorker listed The Age of Surveillance Capitalism as one of its top non-fiction books of 2019. Former US President Barack Obama also listed it as one of his favorite books of 2019, a fact which journalism researcher Avi Ascher-Shapiro found noteworthy, given that the book is critical of the revolving door of personnel between Google and his administration, as well as his presidential campaigns employing surveillance data to target voters.

Sam DiBella, writing for the LSE Blog, criticised the book, feeling its approach could "inspire paralysis rather than praxis when it comes to forging collective action to counter systematic corporate surveillance."

In 2020, Zuboff was interviewed in The Social Dilemma, a docudrama that critically examined the negative effects of social media. In the documentary, The Age of Surveillance Capitalism was mentioned often to explore the underlying economic system that incentivizes addictive algorithms.
