= Josh Whitford =

American sociologist

Josh Whitford is an American sociologist and an associate professor at Columbia University. He writes on economic sociology and organizations.

== Biography ==
Whitford was born in Madison, Wisconsin. He is the son of University of Wisconsin-Madison Law School Professor William Whitford. Whitford attended the University of Wisconsin-Madison. He received a B.A. in math and Italian in 1993, an M.A. in sociology in 1998 with a thesis "Dewey, Parsons, and means-to-ends", and a Ph.D. in sociology in 2003. In 2003 he was a post-doctoral fellow at the Max Planck Institute for the Study of Societies. In 2004 he joined the faculty at Columbia University as an assistant professor and was promoted to associate professor in 2010. He is also a faculty affiliate at the Center on Organizational Innovation. In February 2007, he was named an Industry Studies Fellow by the Alfred P. Sloan Foundation.

== Research ==
Whitford's interests include economic and organizational sociology, comparative political economy, economic geography and pragmatist social theory. His research focuses on the social, political and institutional implications of productive decentralization (outsourcing) in manufacturing industries in both the United States and Europe. Whitford advised the PhD thesis of Ifeoma Ajunwa.

== Publications ==
He is the author of The New Old Economy: Networks, Institutions and the Organizational Transformation of American Manufacturing (Oxford University Press 2005 ISBN 9780199286010). The book has been reviewed in American Journal of Sociology, Administrative Science Quarterly, Contemporary Sociology, Social Forces, Research Policy, Political Studies Review, The Sociological Review, British Journal of Industrial Relations, and European Newsletter of Economic Sociology, in addition to numerous peer-reviewed articles.
