= Data monetization =

Form of monetization

Data monetization, a form of monetization, may refer to the act of generating measurable economic benefits from available data sources (analytics). Less commonly, it may also refer to the act of monetizing data services. In the case of analytics, typically, these benefits accrue as revenue or expense savings, but may also include market share or corporate market value gains. Data monetization leverages data generated through business operations, available exogenous data or content, as well as data associated with individual actors such as that collected via electronic devices and sensors participating in the internet of things. For example, the ubiquity of the internet of things is generating location data and other data from sensors and mobile devices at an ever-increasing rate. When this data is collated against traditional databases, the value and utility of both sources of data increases, leading to tremendous potential to mine data for social good, research and discovery, and achievement of business objectives. Closely associated with data monetization are the emerging data as a service models for transactions involving data by the data item.

There are three ethical and regulatory vectors involved in data monetization due to the sometimes conflicting interests of actors involved in the digital supply chain. The individual data creator who generates files and records through his own efforts or owns a device such as a sensor or a mobile phone that generates data has a claim to ownership of data. The business entity that generates data in the course of its operations, such as its transactions with financial institutions or risk factors discovered through feedback from customers also has a claim on data captured through their systems and platforms. However, the person that contributed the data may also have a legitimate claim on the data. Internet platforms and service providers, such as Google or Facebook that require a user to forgo some ownership interest in their data in exchange for use of the platform also have a legitimate claim on the data. Thus the practice of data monetization, although common since 2000, is now getting increasing attention from regulators. The European Union and the United States Congress have begun to address these issues. For instance, in the financial services industry, regulations involving data are included in the Gramm–Leach–Bliley Act and Dodd-Frank. Some individual creators of data are shifting to using personal data vaults and implementing vendor relationship management concepts as a reflection of an increasing resistance to their data being federated or aggregated and resold without compensation. Groups such as the Personal Data Ecosystem Consortium, Patient privacy rights, and others are also challenging corporate cooptation of data without compensation.

Financial services companies are a relatively good example of an industry focused on generating revenue by leveraging data. Credit card issuers and retail banks use customer transaction data to improve targeting of cross-sell offers. Partners are increasingly promoting merchant based reward programs which leverage a bank’s data and provide discounts to customers at the same time.

== Types of data monetization ==
1. Internal data monetization - An organization's data is used internally, resulting in economic benefit. This is commonly the case in organizations using analytics to uncover insights, resulting in improved profit, cost savings or the avoidance of risk. Internal data monetization is currently the most common form of monetization, requiring far fewer security, intellectual property, and legal precautions when compared to other types. The potential economic gains from this type of data monetization are limited by the organization's internal structure and situation.
2. External data monetization - A person or organization makes data they possess available on a for-fee basis to external parties, or as a broker for same. This type of monetization is less common and requires various methods to distribute the data to potential buyers and consumers. However, the economic gain that results from collecting data, packaging and distributing it, can be quite large.

== Steps ==
1. Identification of available data sources – this includes data currently available for monetization as well as other external data sources that may enhance the value of what’s currently available.
2. Connect, aggregate, attribute, validate, authenticate, and exchange data - this allows data to be converted directly into actionable or revenue generating insight or services.
3. Set terms and prices and facilitate data trading - methods for data vetting, storage, and access. For example, many global corporations have locked and siloed data storage infrastructures, which hinders efficient access to data and cooperative and real-time exchange.
4. Perform Research and analytics – draw predictive insights from existing data as a basis for using data for to reduce risk, enhance product development or performance, or improve customer experience or business outcomes.
5. Action and leveraging – the last phase of monetizing data includes determining alternative or improved data centric products, ideas, or services. Examples may include real-time actionable triggered notifications or enhanced channels such as web or mobile response mechanisms.

== Pricing variables and factors ==
- A fee for
  - use of a platform to connect buyers and sellers
  - use of a platform to configure, organize, and otherwise process data included in a data trade
  - connecting or including a device or sensor into a data supply chain
  - connecting and credentialing a creator of a data source and a data buyer – often through a federated identity
  - connecting a data source to other data sources to be included in a data supply chain
  - use of an internet service or other transmission services for uploading and downloading data – sometimes, for an individual, through a personal cloud
  - use of encrypted keys to achieve secure data transfer
  - use of a search algorithm specifically designed to tag data sources that contain data points of value to the data buyer
  - linking a data creator or generator to a data collection protocol or form
  - server actions – such as a notification – triggered by an update to a data item or data source included in a data supply chain
- A price or exchange or other trade value
  - assigned by a data creator or generator to a data item or a data source
  - offered by a data buyer to a data creator
  - assigned by a data buyer for a data item or a data source formatted according to criteria set by a data buyer
- An incremental fee assigned by a data buyer for a data item or a data set scaled to the reputation of the data creator

== Benefits ==
- Improved decision-making that leads to real time crowd sourced research, improved profits, decreased costs, reduced risk and improved compliance
- More impactful decisions (e.g., make real-time decisions)
- More timely (lower latency) decisions (e.g., a vendor making purchase recommendations while the customer is still on the phone or in the store, a customer connecting with multiple vendors to discover the best price, triggered notifications when thresholds are reached for data values)
- More granular decisions (e.g., localized pricing decisions at an individual or device or sensor level versus larger aggregates).
- Targeted Marketing (e.g., Vendors with access to big data can make targeted advertisements to specific customers within a set data pool decreasing costs for the advertiser and reaching most interested customers)

== Frameworks ==
There are a wide variety of industries, firms and business models related to data monetization. The following frameworks have been offered to help understand the types of business models that are used:

Roger Ehrenberg of IA Ventures, a venture capital firm that invests in this sector, has defined three basic types of data product firms:

Contributory databases. The magic of these businesses is that a customer provides their own data in exchange for receiving a more robust set of aggregated data back that provides insight into the broader marketplace, or provides a vehicle for expressing a view. Give a little, get a lot back in return – a pretty compelling value proposition, and one that frequently results in a payment from the data contributor in exchange for receiving enriched, aggregated data. Once these contributory databases are developed and customers become reliant on their insights, they become extremely valuable and persistent data assets.

Data processing platforms. These businesses create barriers through a combination of complex data architectures, proprietary algorithms, and rich analytics to help customers consume data in whatever form they please. Often these businesses have special relationships with key data providers, that when combined with other data and processed as a whole create valuable differentiation and competitive barriers. Bloomberg is an example of a powerful data processing platform. They pull in data from a wide array of sources (including their own homegrown data), integrate it into a unified stream, make it consumable via a dashboard or through an API, and offer a robust analytics suite for a staggering number of use cases. Needless to say, their scale and profitability is the envy of the industry.

Data creation platforms. These businesses solve vexing problems for large numbers of users, and by their nature capture a broad swath of data from their customers. As these data sets grow, they become increasingly valuable in enabling companies to better tailor their products and features and to target customers with highly contextual and relevant offers. Customers don’t sign up to directly benefit from the data asset; the product is so valuable that they simply want the features offered out-of-the-box. As the product gets better over time, it just cements the lock-in of what is already a successful platform. Mint was an example of this kind of business. People saw value in the core product. But the product continued to get better as more customer data was collected and analyzed. There weren’t network effects, per se, but the sheer scale of the data asset that was created was an essential element of improving the product over time."

Selvanathan and Zuk offer a framework that includes "monetization methods that are outside the bounds of the traditional value capture systems employed by an enterprise... tuned to match the context and consumption models for the target customer." They offer examples of "four distinct approaches: platforms, applications, data-as-a-service, and professional services."

== Examples ==
- Packaging of data (with analytics) to be resold to customers for things such as wallet share, market share and benchmarking
- Integration of data (with analytics) into new products as a value-added differentiator such as On-Star for General Motors cars
- GPS enabled smartphones
- Geolocation-based offers and location discounts, such as those offered by Facebook and Groupon are other prime examples of data monetization leveraging new emerging channels
- CRM based ad targeting and media attribution, such as those offered by Circulate
- Big Data based marketing campaigns like those offered by Instarea.
- Mobile network location data as a trigger for marketing campaigns, like those offered by TASIL & Omantel.

== Intellectual property landscape ==
Some of the patents issued since 2010 by the USPTO for monetizing data generated by individuals include; 8,271,346, 8,612,307, 8,560,464, 8,510,176, and 7,860,760. These are usually in class 705 related to electronic commerce, data processing, and cost and price determination. Some of these patents use the term, the data supply chain to reflect emerging technology to federate and aggregate data in real time from many individuals and devices linked together through the internet of things. Another emerging term is information banking.

An unexplored but potentially disruptive arena for data monetization is the use of Bitcoin micropayments for data transactions. Because Bitcoins are emerging as competitors with payment services like Visa or PayPal that can readily enable and reduce or eliminate transaction costs, transactions for as little as a single data item can be facilitated. Consumers, as well as enterprises who desire to monetize their participation in a data supply chain, may soon be able to access social network enabled Bitcoin exchanges and platforms. Clickbait and data hijacking may wither as micropayments for data are ubiquitous and enabled. Potentially, even the current need to build out data broker managed data trading exchanges may be bypassed. Stanley Smith, who introduced the notion of the data supply chain, has said that simple micropayments for data monetization are the key to evolution of ubiquitous implementation of user configurable data supply schemata, enabling data monetization on a universal scale for all data creators, including the burgeoning internet of things.

== See also ==
- Business intelligence
- Data capitalism
- Data valuation
- Software monetization
- Video game monetization
- Website monetization
