= Informating =

Informating is a term coined by Shoshana Zuboff in her book In the Age of the Smart Machine (1988). It is the process that translates descriptions and measurements of activities, events and objects into information. By doing so, these activities become visible to the organization.

Informating has both an empowering and oppressing influence. On the one hand, as information processes become more powerful, the access to information is pushed to ever lower levels of the organization. Conversely, information processes can be used to monitor what Zuboff calls human agency.

== Zuboff Description ==
From In the Age of the Smart Machine, Informating is described as:

What is it, then, that distinguishes information technology from earlier generations of machine technology? As information technology is used to reproduce, extend, and improve upon the process of substituting machines for human agency, it simultaneously accomplishes something quite different. The devices that automate by translating information into action also register data about those automated activities, thus generating new streams of information. For example, computer-based, numerically controlled machine tools or microprocessor-based sensing devices not only apply programmed instructions to equipment but also convert the current state of equipment, product, or process into data. Scanner devices in supermarkets automate the checkout process and simultaneously generate data that can be used for inventory control, warehousing, scheduling of deliveries, and market analysis. The same systems that make it possible to automate office transactions also create a vast overview of an organization's operations, with many levels of data coordinated and accessible for a variety of analytical efforts." (Zuboff, 1988; p. 9)

== Concept ==
According to Zuboff, any activity, such as two friends using Facebook to communicate, can be said to be informating. In using tools such as Facebook, the two friends are converting their activity of thinking into information. Thereby making their activity visible to another or others.

== Usage of Word ==
Informating as a concept, is being applied to several contexts. For example, in the context of education, Alan November, in his 2010 work, Empowering Students With Technology, wrote: builds on Zuboff's definition:

It is a powerful learning tool because it shifts the power and control to students by giving access to new sources of information and relationships. November states, "Students have access to content information that was previously only available in the teacher's edition of the textbook."
