= Axel Springer Award =

German award

The Axel Springer Award is an annual award given to outstanding personalities who are "exceptionally innovative, create new markets and change markets, shape culture, and face up to their social responsibility". The award, which does not involve a cash prize, was presented for the first time in 2016. The award winners are selected by the Executive Board of the publishing house Axel Springer SE.

== Laureates ==
- 2016: Mark Zuckerberg
- 2017: Timothy Berners-Lee
- 2018: Jeff Bezos
- 2019: Shoshana Zuboff
- 2020: Elon Musk
- 2021: Uğur Şahin and Özlem Türeci
- 2022: Volodymyr Zelenskyy
- 2023: Satya Nadella
- 2025: Sam Altman
- 2026: Peter Thiel
