= Shoshana Zuboff =

American scholar (born 1951)

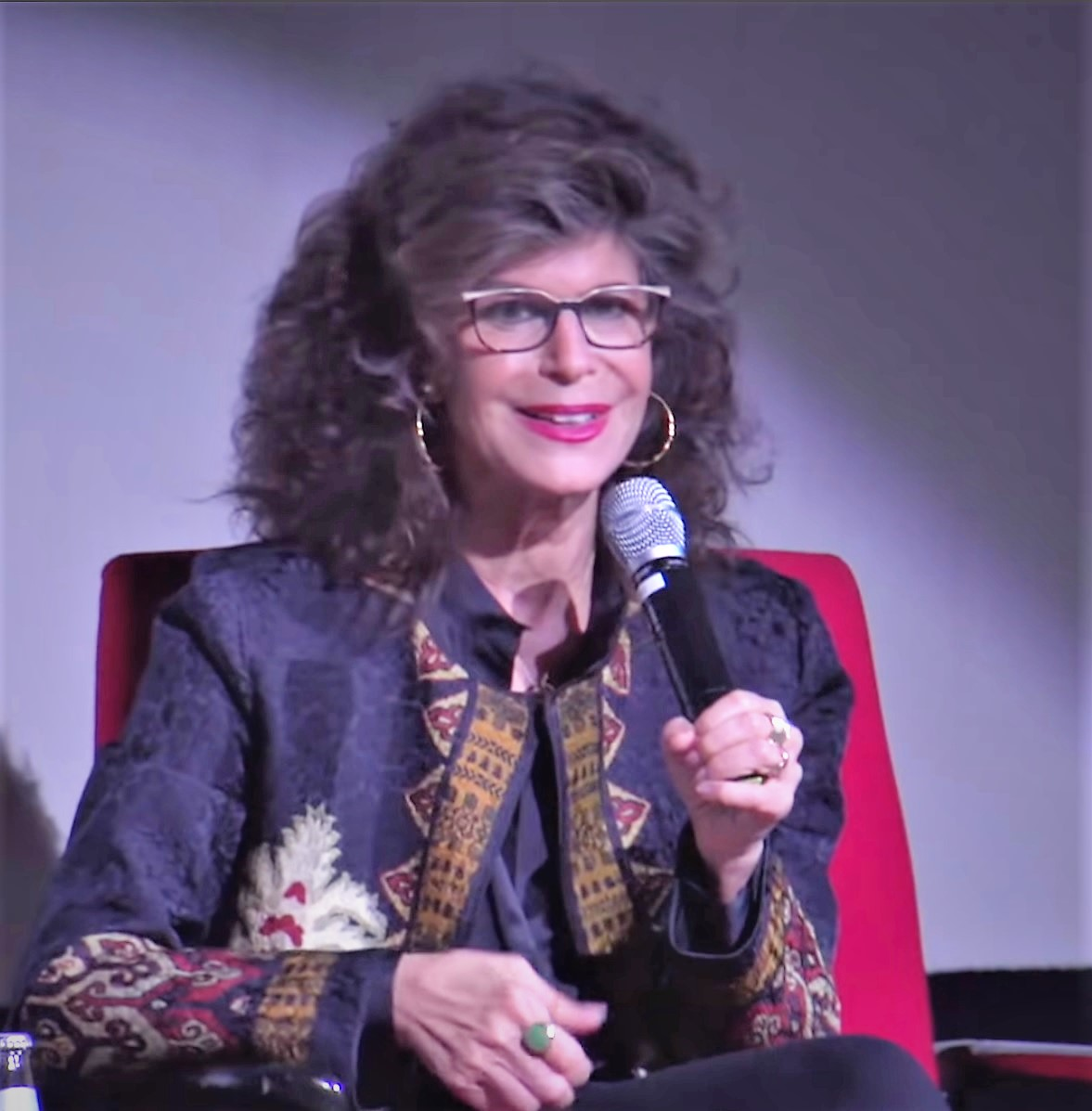
- Zuboff in 2019
- Born: November 18, 1951 (age 74)
- Title: Charles Edward Wilson Professor Emerita Harvard Business School
- Spouse: Jim Maxmin (died 2016)
- Children: 2, including Chloe Maxmin
- Awards: 2019 Axel Springer Award, 2024 McGill University Faculty of Engineering Honorary Degree

Academic background
- Education: University of Chicago (BA); Harvard University (PhD)
- Thesis: The Ego at Work: Psychological Development in an Organizational Context (1980)
- Doctoral advisor: Herbert Kelman
- Influences: Karl Marx; Émile Durkheim; Max Weber; Hannah Arendt; Theodor Adorno; Karl Polanyi; Jean-Paul Sartre

Academic work
- Discipline: Social psychology, information systems
- Sub-discipline: History of work; history of capitalism; adult development; social psychology of technology
- Institutions: Harvard Business School
- Notable ideas: Surveillance capitalism
- Website: shoshanazuboff.com

Shoshana Zuboff (born November 18, 1951) is an American author, professor, social psychologist, philosopher, and scholar. She is a professor emerita at Harvard Business School.

Zuboff is the author of the books In the Age of the Smart Machine: The Future of Work and Power and The Support Economy: Why Corporations Are Failing Individuals and the Next Episode of Capitalism, co-authored with James Maxmin. The Age of Surveillance Capitalism: The Fight for a Human Future at the New Frontier of Power, integrates core themes of her research: the Digital Revolution, the evolution of capitalism, the historical emergence of psychological individuality, and the conditions for human development.

Zuboff's work is the source of many original concepts including "surveillance capitalism", "instrumentarian power", the "division of learning in society", "economies of action", the "means of behavior modification", "information civilization", "computer-mediated work", the "automate/informate" dialectic, "abstraction of work", "individualization of consumption" and the "coup from above".

== Background and education ==
Zuboff was born in New England but spent much of her childhood in Argentina. She received her B.A. in philosophy from the University of Chicago, and her PhD in social psychology from Harvard University.

Zuboff was married to businessman and academic James Maxmin until his death in 2016. They co-wrote two books together, and lived in Nobleboro, Maine. They had a son, Jake, and a daughter, Chloe, who is a former state legislator in Maine.

== Career ==
Zuboff joined Harvard Business School in 1981 where she became the Charles Edward Wilson Professor of Business Administration and one of the first tenured women on the HBS faculty. In 2014 and 2015 she was a Faculty Associate at the Berkman Klein Center for Internet and Society at the Harvard Law School.

== Writings and research ==
=== In the Age of the Smart Machine ===
Zuboff's 1988 book, In the Age of the Smart Machine: The Future of Work and Power, is a study of information technology in the workplace.

Major concepts introduced in this book relate to knowledge, authority, and power in the information workplace. These include the duality of information technology as an informating and an automating technology; the abstraction of work associated with information technology and its related intellectual skill demands; computer-mediated work; the "information panopticon"; information technology as a challenge to managerial authority and command/control; the social construction of technology; the shift from a division of labor to a division of learning; and the inherently collaborative patterns of information work, among others.

=== The Support Economy ===
The Support Economy: Why Corporations Are Failing Individuals and the Next Episode of Capitalism (2002), co-authored with James Maxmin, is the product of multi-disciplinary research integrating history, sociology, management, and economics. It argues that the new structure of demand associated with the "individuation of consumption" had produced widespread institutional failures in every domain, including a growing divide between the individuals and the commercial organizations upon which they depend.

Writing before the advent of smartphones and widespread Internet access, Zuboff and Maxmin argue that wealth creation in an individualized society would require leveraging new digital capabilities to enable a "distributed capitalism". This would entail a shift away from a primary focus on economies of scale, asset intensification, concentration, central control, and anonymous transactions in "organization-space" towards support-oriented relationships in "individual-space" with products and services configured and distributed to meet individualized wants and needs.

=== Surveillance Capitalism ===
Zuboff's work explores a novel market form and a specific logic of capitalist accumulation that she terms "surveillance capitalism". She first presented her concept in a 2014 essay, "A Digital Declaration", published in German and English in the Frankfurter Allgemeine Zeitung. Her follow-up 2015 scholarly article in the Journal of Information Technology titled "Big Other: Surveillance Capitalism and the Prospects of an Information Civilization" received the International Conference on Information Systems Scholars' 2016 Best Paper Award.

Surveillance capitalism and its consequences for twenty-first century society are most fully theorized in her book The Age of Surveillance Capitalism: The Fight for a Human Future at the New Frontier of Power. She summarizes it thusly: "Surveillance capitalism is best described as a coup from above, not an overthrow of the state but rather an overthrow of the people's sovereignty and a prominent force in the perilous drift towards democratic de-consolidation that now threatens Western liberal democracies."

The "epistemic coup" (i.e., the coup enacted by tech corporations to claim ownership of knowledge in society) is summarized as follows:

In an information civilization, societies are defined by questions of knowledge—how it is distributed, the authority that governs its distribution and the power that protects that authority. Who knows? Who decides who knows? Who decides who decides who knows? Surveillance capitalists now hold the answers to each question, though we never elected them to govern.

This is the essence of the epistemic coup. They claim the authority to decide who knows by asserting ownership rights over our personal information and defend that authority with the power to control critical information systems and infrastructures.

Zuboff's scholarship on surveillance capitalism as a "rogue mutation of capitalism" has become a primary framework for understanding big data and the larger field of commercial surveillance that she describes as a "surveillance-based economic order". She argues that neither privacy nor antitrust laws provide adequate protection from the unprecedented practices of surveillance capitalism. Zuboff describes surveillance capitalism as an economic and social logic. Her book originated the concept of "instrumentarian power", in comparison to traditional totalitarian power. Instrumentarian power is a consequence of surveillance capitalist operations which threaten individual autonomy and democracy. As the driving force behind it, she identifies capital accumulation, without being confined to market capitalism.

Many issues that plague contemporary society including the assault on privacy and the so-called "privacy paradox", behavioral targeting, fake news, ubiquitous tracking, legislative and regulatory failure, algorithmic governance, social media addiction, abrogation of human rights, democratic destabilization, and more are reinterpreted and explained through the lens of surveillance capitalism's economic and social imperatives. Her work is an influential source for the Human-Centered Artificial Intelligence community.

Zuboff uses Pokémon Go and the Google Nest microphone controversy to illustrate how tech firms extract behavioral data to predict and modify human conduct. She argues that Pokémon Go, developed by Google-spinout Niantic Labs, acted as a "dry run" for larger-scale urban surveillance by physically herding players toward commercial establishments like McDonald’s and Starbucks, which paid for increased foot traffic. Meanwhile, the author cites the discovery of an undocumented microphone in the Google Home/Nest system as evidence of deliberate obfuscation, noting that Google dismissed the hardware inclusion as a mere "error" rather than acknowledging it as part of a broader strategy to monitor private spaces.

== Other activities ==
=== Odyssey ===
In 1993, Zuboff founded the executive education program "Odyssey: School for the Second Half of Life" at the Harvard Business School. The program addressed the issues of transformation and career renewal at midlife. During twelve years of her teaching and leadership, Odyssey became known as the premier program of its kind in the world.

=== Non-academic work ===
In addition to her academic work, Zuboff brought her ideas to many commercial and public/private ventures through her public speaking as well as her direct involvement in key projects, particularly in social housing, health care, education, and elder care.

Zuboff also became a business columnist, developing and disseminating new concepts from The Support Economy. From 2003 to 2005, Zuboff published her ideas in her monthly column "Evolving", published in the magazine Fast Company. From 2007 through 2009, she was a featured columnist for Business Week.

From 2013 to 2016, Zuboff was a frequent contributor to the Frankfurter Allgemeine Zeitung (FAZ), where essays drawn from her emerging work on surveillance capitalism were published in German and English. In 2019, Zuboff further developed her critique of the social, political and economic impacts of digital technologies in The Age of Surveillance Capitalism.

On September 25, 2020, Zuboff was named as one of the 25 members of the Real Facebook Oversight Board, an independent monitoring group over Facebook.

From 2020 until 2025, Zuboff was the director of 5Rights Foundation, an organization founded by Baroness Beeban Kidron to promote the rights of children online.

== Awards and honors ==
Zuboff's work, The Age of Surveillance Capitalism, earned her multiple awards and honorary degrees. In 2019, she was the recipient of the 2019 Axel Springer Award. In 2021, she was awarded the inaugural Global Privacy Assembly Giovanni Buttarelli Award, the Electronic Privacy Information Center (EPIC) Lifetime Achievement Award, and an honorary doctorate from the University of Amsterdam. And lastly in 2024, she was awarded an honorary degree from the McGill University Faculty of Engineering.

== Books ==
- In the Age of the Smart Machine: The Future of Work and Power (1988)
- The Support Economy: Why Corporations Are Failing Individuals and the Next Episode of Capitalism (2002)
- The Age of Surveillance Capitalism: The Fight for a Human Future at the New Frontier of Power (Campus, 2018; PublicAffairs, 2019)

== See also ==
- Decomputing
- Resisting AI
