= Self-optimization =

One of the pillars of the self-organizing networks management paradigm

In cellular communications technology, self-optimization is a process in which the system’s settings are autonomously and continuously adapted to the traffic profile and the network environment in terms of topology, propagation and interference. Together with self-planning and self-healing, self-optimization is one of the key pillars of the self-organizing networks (SON) management paradigm proposed by the Next Generation Mobile Networks Alliance. The autonomous trait of self-optimization involves no human intervention at all during the aforementioned optimization process.

In the area of control engineering most compact controllers for the industrial sector include an automatic adjustment of the control parameters to the connected section. This function is called auto-tuning or self-optimization. Usually, two different types of self-tuning are available in the controller: the oscillation method and the step response method.

The term is also used in Computer Science to describe a portion of an information system that pursues its own objectives to the detriment of the overall system. Low level of self optimization amongst system components leads to Coupling. High level of self optimization leads to Cohesion

== See also ==
- Self-management (computer science)
- Self-optimizing network
