= Data capitalism =

In information economics, data capitalism denotes a "genus" of capitalism where data is the source of monetization and often the currency and the final value.

A typical application of the principles of data worth is found in surveillance capitalism. The methodology for processing such mass data is usually summarized in the buzzword 'big data'.

The general concept of monetization of data is described in data monetization.

== See also ==
- Information society
- Neuromarketing
