= In-network management =

Framework for administering communications

With current network management technologies, management functions typically reside outside the network in management stations and servers, which interact with network elements and devices via network protocols for management, in order to execute management tasks, including fault, configuration, accounting, performance, and security management, or, short (FCAPS). Most of these tasks are performed on a per-device basis. During network operation, for instance, a management station periodically polls individual devices in its domain for the values of local variables, such as devices counters or performance parameters. These variables are then processed on the management station to compute an estimate of a network-wide state, which is analyzed and acted upon by management applications. This paradigm of interaction between the management system and managed system underlies traditional management frameworks and protocols, including SNMP, TMN and OSI-SM.

In the view of Future Internet activities in the research communities around the globe, the network management of a Future Internet is of major concern in the view of requiring more self-management, more automation of the management, and easier use of management tools. In-network management has been developed and discussed in a larger community gathered around project partners involved in the EU FP7 project 4WARD, EU project AutoI and EU project UniverSELF.

== The in-network (In-bound) management vision ==
In-network management (INM) supports management operations by the means of a highly distributed architecture. The main objective is the design of management functions that are located in- or close to the network elements and services to be managed, in most of the cases co-located on the same nodes; as target approach, they would be co-designed with the network elements and services. The vision of the INM paradigm of embedding management capabilities in the network. The benefit of the resulting distributed in-bound network management architecture - is the inherent support for self-management features, integral automation and autonomicity capabilities, easier use of management tools and empowering the network with inbuilt cognition and intelligence. Additional benefits include reduction and optimisation in the amount of external management interactions, which is key to the minimization of manual interaction and the sustaining of manageability of large networked systems and moving from a managed object paradigm to one of management by objective.

The design space of INM is spanned along seven axes:

1. Along the degree of embedding: Management processes and functions can be implemented as external, separated, integrated, or inherent management capabilities of the network or services. Integrated is weaker than inherent in that instead of indistinguishable management functionality, it designates visible and modular management capabilities, but which are still closely related to and integrated with specific services. Separated management processes are those that are more decoupled from the service, and include, for example, weakly distributed management approaches. External management processes include traditional network management paradigms widely used today.
2. Along the degree of autonomy, the INM architecture allows for different degrees of autonomous management, from manual to fully autonomous processes. Manual refers to the direct manual manipulation of management parameters, such as manual routing configurations. Automated management can be typically found in the application of management scripts. Autonomic Networking and autonomous degrees include intelligence that allows the system to govern its own behavior in terms of network management.
3. Along the degree of abstraction, different levels of management according to the telecommunications management network (TMN) functional hierarchy can be adopted. This dimension leads to a reduction in the amount of external management interactions, which is key to the minimization of manual interaction and the sustaining of manageability of large networked systems. Specifically, this dimension can be understood as moving from a managed object paradigm to one of management by objective.
4. Along the degree of automation from manual to fully automatic processes and operations: Manual management operations refer to the direct manual manipulation of management parameters, such as manual routing configurations. Automated management operations can be typically found in the application of management scripts.
5. Along the degree of autonomicity: it includes levels of intelligence and cognition that allows the system to govern its own behaviour in terms of network and service management.
6. Along the degree of orchestration: it allows cooperation and interworking of closed control loops specific to different management functions and operations.
7. Along the degree of extensibility: it refers to the ability to extend a system and the level of effort and complexity required to realize an extension. Extensions can be through as the addition of new functionality, new characteristics or through modification of existing functionality and characteristics, while minimizing impact to existing system functions; the degree of extensibility covers Plug_and_Play/Unplug_and_Play approaches, on demand deployment of management functionality and dynamic programmability of management functions.

UMF – Unified Management Framework is being developed by the UniverSelf project, as the means of integrating the design space for INM.

More detailed information about that concept can be found in:
