= Commercialization =

Process of introducing a new product onto the market

Commercialization or commercialisation is the process of introducing a new product, service or production method into commerce—making it available on the market. The term often connotes especially entry into the mass market (as opposed to entry into earlier niche markets), but it also includes a move from the laboratory into (even limited) commerce. Many technologies begin in a research and development laboratory or an inventor's workshop and may not be practical for commercial use in their infancy (as prototypes). The "development" segment of the "research and development" spectrum requires time and money as systems are engineered with a view to making the product or method a paying commercial proposition.

The product launch of a new product is the final stage of new product development – at this point advertising, sales promotion, and other marketing efforts encourage commercial adoption of the product or method. Beyond commercialization (in which technologies enter the business world) can lie consumerization (in which they become consumer goods, as for example when computers went from the laboratory to the enterprise and then to the home, pocket, or body).

== Process ==
Commercialization is sometimes confused with sales, marketing, or business development; however it integrates elements of each while extending beyond them—ranging from identifying commercializable opportunities to achieving long-term commercial success.

The commercialization process has three key features:

1. The funnel: It is essential to evaluate many ideas to identify one or two commercially viable products or businesses.
2. A stage-based process: commercialization is a stage-wise process, and each stage has its own key goals and milestones.
3. Early stakeholder involvement: it is vital to involve key stakeholders early, including customers to validate assumptions, reduce uncertainty, and improve the likelihood of commercial success.

== Issues ==
Proposed commercialization of a product can raise the following questions:

1. When to launch: Factors such as potential cannibalization of the sales of a vendor's other products, any requirement for further improvement of the proposed new product, or unfavorable market conditions may operate to delay a product launch.
2. Where to launch: A potential vendor can start marketing in a single location, in one or several regions, or in a national or international market. Existing resources (in terms of capital, and operational capacities) and the degree of managerial confidence may strongly influence the proposed launch-mode. Smaller vendors usually launch in attractive cities or regions, while larger companies may enter a national market at once.
  Global roll-outs generally remain the preserve of multinational conglomerates, since they have the necessary size and make use of international distribution systems (e.g., Unilever, Procter & Gamble). Other multinationals may use a "lead-country" strategy: introducing the new product in one country/region at a time (e.g. Colgate-Palmolive).
3. Whom to target: Research- and test-marketing may identify a primary consumer group. The ideal primary consumer group should consist of innovators, early adopters, heavy users and/or opinion leaders. This will encourage adoption by other buyers in the market during the product-growth period.
4. How to launch: Prospective vendors should decide on an action plan for introducing a proposed product - a plan shaped by addressing the questions above. The vendor has to develop a viable marketing-mix and to structure a corresponding marketing-budget.

== See also ==
- Commodification
- New product development
- Technology Transfer
- Commercialization of the Internet
- Commercialization of renewable energy
- Commercialization of space
- Commercialisation of sport
