= Surveillance capitalism =

Concept in political economics

Surveillance capitalism is a concept in political economics which denotes the widespread collection and commodification of personal data by corporations. This phenomenon is distinct from government surveillance, although the two can be mutually reinforcing. The concept of surveillance capitalism, as described by Shoshana Zuboff, is driven by a profit-making incentive, and arose as advertising companies, led by Google's AdWords, saw the possibilities of using personal data to target consumers more precisely.

Increased data collection may have various benefits for individuals and society, such as self-optimization (the quantified self), societal optimizations (e.g., by smart cities) and optimized services (including various web applications). However, as capitalism focuses on expanding the proportion of social life that is open to data collection and data processing, this can have significant implications for vulnerability and control of society, as well as for privacy.

The economic pressures of capitalism are driving the intensification of online connection and monitoring, with spaces of social life opening up to saturation by corporate actors, directed at making profits and/or regulating behavior. Personal smart phone data is available by corporate equipment which pretends to be cell telephone towers thus tracking and monitoring private persons in public spaces which is sold to governments or other companies. Therefore, personal data points increase in value after the possibilities of targeted advertising were known. As a result, the increasing price of data has limited access to the purchase of personal data points to the richest in society.

== Background ==
Shoshana Zuboff writes that "analysing massive data sets began as a way to reduce uncertainty by discovering the probabilities of future patterns in the behavior of people and systems". In 2014, Vincent Mosco referred to the marketing of information about customers and subscribers to advertisers as surveillance capitalism and made note of the surveillance state alongside it. Christian Fuchs found that the surveillance state fuses with surveillance capitalism.

Similarly, Zuboff informs that the issue is further complicated by highly invisible collaborative arrangements with state security apparatuses. According to Trebor Scholz, companies recruit people as informants for this type of capitalism. Zuboff contrasts the mass production of industrial capitalism with surveillance capitalism, where the former was interdependent with its populations, who were its consumers and employees, and the latter preys on dependent populations, who are neither its consumers nor its employees and largely ignorant of its procedures.

Their research shows that the capitalist addition to the analysis of massive amounts of data has taken its original purpose in an unexpected direction. Surveillance has been changing power structures in the information economy, potentially shifting the balance of power further from nation-states and towards large corporations employing the surveillance capitalist logic.

Zuboff notes that surveillance capitalism extends beyond the conventional institutional terrain of the private firm, accumulating not only surveillance assets and capital but also rights, and operating without meaningful mechanisms of consent. In other words, analysing massive data sets was at some point not only executed by the state apparatuses but also companies. Zuboff claims that both Google and Facebook have invented surveillance capitalism and translated it into "a new logic of accumulation".

This mutation resulted in both companies collecting very large numbers of data points about their users, with the core purpose of making a profit. By selling these data points to external users (particularly advertisers), it has become an economic mechanism. The combination of the analysis of massive data sets and the use of these data sets as a market mechanism has shaped the concept of surveillance capitalism. Surveillance capitalism has been heralded as the successor to neoliberalism.

Oliver Stone, creator of the film Snowden, pointed to the location-based game Pokémon Go as the "latest sign of the emerging phenomenon and demonstration of surveillance capitalism". Stone criticized that the location of its users was used not only for game purposes, but also to retrieve more information about its players. By tracking users' locations, the game collected far more information than just users' names and locations: "it can access the contents of your USB storage, your accounts, photographs, network connections, and phone activities, and can even activate your phone, when it is in standby mode". This data can then be analysed and commodified by companies such as Google (which significantly invested in the game's development) to improve the effectiveness of targeted advertisement.

Another aspect of surveillance capitalism is its influence on political campaigning. Personal data retrieved by data miners can enable various companies (most notoriously Cambridge Analytica) to improve the targeting of political advertising, a step beyond the commercial aims of previous surveillance capitalist operations. In this way, it is possible that political parties will be able to produce far more targeted political advertising to maximise its impact on voters. However, Cory Doctorow writes that the misuse of these data sets "will lead us towards totalitarianism". This may resemble a corporatocracy, and Joseph Turow writes that "the centrality of corporate power is a direct reality at the very heart of the digital age".

== Theory ==
=== Shoshana Zuboff ===
The terminology "surveillance capitalism" was popularized by Harvard Professor Shoshana Zuboff. In Zuboff's theory, surveillance capitalism is a novel market form and a specific logic of capitalist accumulation. In her 2014 essay A Digital Declaration: Big Data as Surveillance Capitalism, she characterized it as a "radically disembedded and extractive variant of information capitalism" based on the commodification of "reality" and its transformation into behavioral data for analysis and sales.

In a subsequent article in 2015, Zuboff analyzed the societal implications of this mutation of capitalism. She distinguished between "surveillance assets", "surveillance capital", and "surveillance capitalism" and their dependence on a global architecture of computer mediation that she calls "Big Other", a distributed and largely uncontested new expression of power that constitutes hidden mechanisms of extraction, commodification, and control that threatens core values such as freedom, democracy, and privacy.

According to Zuboff, surveillance capitalism was pioneered by Google and later Facebook, just as mass-production and managerial capitalism were pioneered by Ford and General Motors a century earlier, and has now become the dominant form of information capitalism. Zuboff emphasizes that behavioral changes enabled by artificial intelligence have become aligned with the financial goals of American internet companies such as Google, Facebook, and Amazon.

In her Oxford University lecture published in 2016, Zuboff identified the mechanisms and practices of surveillance capitalism, including the production of "prediction products" for sale in new "behavioral futures markets." She introduced the concept "dispossession by surveillance", arguing that it challenges the psychological and political bases of self-determination by concentrating rights in the surveillance regime. This is described as a "coup from above."

==== Key features ====
Zuboff's book The Age of Surveillance Capitalism is a detailed examination of the unprecedented power of surveillance capitalism and the quest by powerful corporations to predict and control human behavior. Zuboff identifies four key features in the logic of surveillance capitalism and explicitly follows the four key features identified by Google's chief economist, Hal Varian:

1. The drive toward more and more data extraction and analysis.
2. The development of new contractual forms using computer-monitoring and automation.
3. The desire to personalize and customize the services offered to users of digital platforms.
4. The use of the technological infrastructure to carry out continual experiments on its users and consumers.

==== Analysis ====
Zuboff compares demanding privacy from surveillance capitalists or lobbying for an end to commercial surveillance on the Internet to asking Henry Ford to make each Model T by hand and states that such demands are existential threats that violate the basic mechanisms of the entity's survival.

Zuboff warns that principles of self-determination might be forfeited due to "ignorance, learned helplessness, inattention, inconvenience, habituation, or drift" and states that "we tend to rely on mental models, vocabularies, and tools distilled from past catastrophes," referring to the twentieth century's totalitarian nightmares or the monopolistic predations of Gilded Age capitalism, with countermeasures that have been developed to fight those earlier threats not being sufficient or even appropriate to meet the novel challenges.

She also poses the question: "will we be the masters of information, or will we be its slaves?" and states that "if the digital future is to be our home, then it is we who must make it so".

In her book, Zuboff discusses the differences between industrial capitalism and surveillance capitalism. Zuboff writes that as industrial capitalism exploited nature, surveillance capitalism exploits human nature.

=== John Bellamy Foster and Robert W. McChesney ===
The term "surveillance capitalism" has also been used by political economists John Bellamy Foster and Robert W. McChesney, although with a different meaning. In an article published in Monthly Review in 2014, they apply it to describe the manifestation of the "insatiable need for data" of financialization, which they explain is "the long-term growth speculation on financial assets relative to GDP" introduced in the United States by industry and government in the 1980s that evolved out of the military-industrial complex and the advertising industry.

== Response ==
Numerous organizations have been struggling for free speech and privacy rights in the new surveillance capitalism and various national governments have enacted privacy laws. It is also conceivable that new capabilities and uses for mass-surveillance require structural changes towards a new system to create accountability and prevent misuse. Government attention towards the dangers of surveillance capitalism especially increased after the exposure of the Facebook–Cambridge Analytica data scandal that occurred in early 2018. In response to the misuse of mass-surveillance multiple states have taken preventive measures. The European Union, for example, has reacted to these events and restricted its rules and regulations on misusing big data. Surveillance capitalism has become a lot harder under these rules, known as the General Data Protection Regulations. However, implementing preventive measures against misuse of mass-surveillance is hard for many countries as it requires structural change of the system.

Bruce Sterling's 2014 lecture at Strelka Institute "The epic struggle of the internet of things" explained how consumer products could become surveillance objects that track people's everyday life. In his talk, Sterling highlights the alliances between multinational corporations who develop Internet of Things-based surveillance systems which feeds surveillance capitalism.

In 2015, Tega Brain and Surya Mattu's satirical artwork Unfit Bits encourages users to subvert fitness data collected by Fitbits. They suggested ways to fake datasets by attaching the device, for example to a metronome or on a bicycle wheel. In 2018, Brain created a project with Sam Lavigne called New Organs which collect people's stories of being monitored online and offline.

The 2019 documentary film The Great Hack tells the story of how a company named Cambridge Analytica used Facebook to manipulate the 2016 U.S. presidential election. Extensive profiling of users and news feeds that are ordered by black box algorithms were presented as the main source of the problem, which is also mentioned in Zuboff's book. The usage of personal data to subject individuals to categorization and potentially politically influence individuals highlights how individuals can become voiceless in the face of data misuse. This highlights the crucial role surveillance capitalism can have on social injustice as it can affect all aspects of life.

== See also ==
- Adware – Software with, often unwanted, adverts
- Commercialization of the Internet – Running online services principally for financial gain
- Criticism of capitalism – Arguments against the economic system of capitalism
- Data capitalism
- Data mining – Process of analyzing large data sets
- Decomputing
- Digital integrity
- Five Eyes – Anglosphere intelligence alliance
- Free and open-source software – Freely licensed software with open code
- Googlization – Neologism
- Mass surveillance industry
- Microtargeting – Usage of online data for individuals advertising
- Surveillance § Corporate
- Surveillance pricing
- Targeted advertising – Form of advertising
- Personalized marketing – Marketing strategy using data analysis to deliver individualized messages and products
- Platform capitalism – Business model of technological platforms
- Privacy concerns with social networking services
- Social profiling – Process of constructing a social media user's profile using his or her social data
