= Gender, Institutions and Development Database =

Tracks gender inequality across laws and norms

The OECD Gender, Institutions and Development (GID) Database, or GID-DB, contains more than 60 data indicators of gender equality. The GID-DB was introduced in 2006 by the OECD Development Centre to provide a data tool to help researchers and policy makers determine and analyze obstacles to women's social and economic development. It provides these gender-related data for up to 162 countries from Afghanistan to Zimbabwe, thereby covering all regions and country-income-categories of the world.

== Database composition ==
The GID Database is structured around key traditional measurements of gender equality, including Education (data such as literacy rates and school enrollments for each gender), Health (such as percentage of births attended by skilled personnel), Economic status and Political status (such as percentage of legislators for each gender). The GID-DB also introduced non-traditional data indicators for "social institutions" such as cultural practices and social norms which affect gender equality. These new measurements are thoroughly presented here, in the next section. By providing new indicator information on these formerly "hidden" instances of gender discrimination, the database complements other data compilations such as the UNDP's Human Development Report, the World Bank Group's GenderStats database, or the World Economic Forum's Global Gender Gap Report.

== Measures of social institutions ==
The GID database groups its 12 social-institution indicators into 5 different categories, below. Each of these 12 indicators is a cultural and traditional practice that impacts upon gender equality. Each indicator is coded between 0 (indicating no discrimination, i.e., equality) and 1 (indicating high discrimination, or high inequality) depending on the extent of discrimination and the percentage of females that suffer from its application, for each specific social institution. As an example, consider Inheritance, the second social institution or indicator below: If 10 percent of the female population in a country report restricted access to inheritance, with daughters inheriting only half the amount granted to sons, the indicator for inheritance would be 10 percent x 0.50 = 0.05, nearly equality. Values above 0 can be too complicated to describe briefly, in which case they are omitted below.

Family Code:

- Parental authority – authority is granted to father and mother equally (yes = 0).
- Inheritance – inheritance practices in favour of male heirs (no = 0).
- Early marriage (women) – share of girls between 15 and 19 who are or have been married.
- Polygamy – acceptance or legality of polygamy (no = 0).

Civil Liberties:

- Freedom of movement – freedom to move freely outside of the house (no discrimination = 0).
- Dress code in public – obligation to wear a veil in public (no = 0).

Physical Integrity:

- Violence against women/Legal indicator – existence of laws against 3 categories (domestic, assault or rape, and sexual harassment; averaged together), with totally illegal = 0.
- Female genital mutilation – share of women with genital mutilation.

Son Preference:

- Son preference (missing women) compares "the number of women that should be alive (assuming no son preference) and the actual number of women in a country." – No women are missing = 0.

Ownership Rights:

- Women's access to land ownership – (value between 0 = full access and 1 = impossible).
- Women's access to bank loans – (between 0 = full access and 1 = impossible).
- Women's access to owning property other than land – (between 0 = full and 1 = no).

The GID database itself is the source for these brief descriptions. Namely, the GID-DB includes a complete description for each data indicator, called its metadata, which stays hidden until one clicks on that indicator's little red "i" – the working definitions for the data indicators are easily available online right with the data.

== Use of the GID-DB tool ==
The GID-DB has been statistically applied toward identifying the factors which determine how women's labour-force participation varies across the database countries. The reported results suggest that the social-institution factors or indicators can outweigh the other traditional indicators such as income per capita. The GID database including its social-institution indicators thus may be useful in solving various economic development problems, by offering a more complete set of indicators from which to choose for answering policy questions or for other research topics.

== Composite index of gender equality ==
The UNDP (UN Development Programme) publishes two composite indexes of gender equality, based on traditional indicators (such as the above-mentioned ones in the GID-DB), namely the Gender Empowerment Measure, or GEM, and the Gender-related Development Index or GDI.

In 2009, similarly the OECD Development Centre introduced the Social Institutions and Gender Index (SIGI), which is described in its own article. The SIGI is exclusively based on the 12 new social institutions above, their 5 groups providing the SIGI's 5 components. Given its exclusive focus on social institutions, the SIGI is a highly specialized measure of gender equality – and should not be confused with the GEM and the GDI.

The SIGI and its 5 components were added in 2009 to the GID-DB, readily accessible (as described below) as a specific part of the latter.

== Accessing the GID-DB data ==
These data can be accessed via the OECD website StatExtracts (GID-DB), whose sidebar has all of the GID database's components selected and ready to click on, with its 12 Social Institution indicators already on display in the main part of the screen. More information such as working definitions of the data, plus the country notes, can be displayed (or hidden again) by clicking on the little red i's.

Many other OECD datasets are listed in the sidebar, in addition to the GID-DB data which are the subject of this article.

== See also ==
- Gender equality
- Human Development Report
- OECD Development Centre
- Social Institutions and Gender Index
- Women's rights
