= Gyde =

Gyde may refer to:

- Gyde Jørgensen, 1911 Danish chess champion
- Gyde Spandemager (died 1543), alleged Danish witch
- Gyda of Sweden (died c. 1048/1049), Swedish princess and Danish queen consort
- Praxille Gydé, French boxer, European Boxing Union flyweight champion, 1932–1935
- Sylvia Gyde (died 2024), British public health doctor and medical researcher

== See also ==
- GYD (disambiguation)
