= Human Development Report =

United Nations Development Programme report

The world map representing Human Development Index categories (based on 2023 data, published in 2025): Very high; High; Medium; Low; No data

The Human Development Report (HDR) is an annual Human Development Index report published by the Human Development Report Office of the United Nations Development Programme (UNDP).

The first HDR was launched in 1990 by the Pakistani economist Mahbub ul Haq and Indian Nobel laureate Amartya Sen. Since then reports have been released most years, and have explored different themes through the human development approach, which places people at the center of the development process.

The reports are ensured of editorial independence by the United Nations General Assembly. They are seen as reports to UNDP, not of UNDP. This allows each report greater freedom to explore ideas and constructively challenge policies. Each report also presents an updated set of indices, including the Human Development Index (HDI), which is a measure of average achievement in the basic dimensions of human development across countries, and a compendium of key development statistics relevant to the report theme.

The Human Development Reports have an extensive influence on the development debate worldwide. They have also inspired national and regional analyses which, by their nature, usually address issues that are more country – or regionally – specific.

== History ==
The report was first launched in 1990 by the Pakistani economist Mahbub ul Haq and Indian Nobel laureate Amartya Sen. Its goal was to place people at the center of the development process in terms of economic debate, policy and advocacy. Development was characterized by the provision of choices and freedoms resulting in widespread outcomes.

"People are the real wealth of a nation," Haq wrote in the opening lines of the first report in 1990. "The basic objective of development is to create an enabling environment for people to enjoy long, healthy and creative lives. This may appear to be a simple truth. But it is often forgotten in the immediate concern with the accumulation of commodities and financial wealth."

The United Nations General Assembly has formally recognized the Report as "an independent intellectual exercise" and "an important tool for raising awareness about human development around the world."

The Human Development Report is an independent report, commissioned by the United Nations Development Programme (UNDP), and is the product of a selected team of leading scholars, development practitioners and members of the Human Development Report Office of UNDP. It is a report independent of the Administrator of the UNDP, as suggested by Mahbub ul Haq. It is translated into numerous languages and launched in more than 100 countries annually.

Since 1990, more than 140 countries have published some 600 national Human Development Reports, with UNDP support. UNDP has also sponsored scores of regional reports, such as the ten-volume Arab Human Development Report series, which have made internationally recognized contributions to the global dialogue on democracy, women's rights, inequality, poverty eradication and other critical issues.

The 2010 Human Development Report's review of human development trends showed that most developing countries made dramatic yet often underestimated progress in health, education and basic living standards since 1970 with many of the poorest countries posting the greatest gains.

In the 2010 Report, the Sultanate of Oman was reported to be the most improved country in the past 40 years out of the 135 countries assessed (the report reported on improvement in the period 1970–2010). Oman's strides in education, women's empowerment and health care under the patronage of the current Sultan of Oman led to it securing the 1st position.

Several new indices have been introduced over the years in different reports, including the Human Development Index, the Gender-related Development Index, the Gender Empowerment Measure, the Human Poverty Index. The Gender-related Development Index, the Gender Empowerment Measure and the Human Poverty Index were removed in 2010. The 2010 Human Development Report introduced three new indices the Inequality-adjusted Human Development Index, the Gender Inequality Index, and the Multidimensional Poverty Index. Each Report has its own focus drawn from contemporary debate.

The 2009 Human Development Report, Overcoming Barriers, focused on migration – both within and beyond borders. It was chosen because it is a prominent theme in domestic and international debates. Its starting point is that the global distribution of capabilities is extraordinarily unequal and that this is a major driver for the movement of people.

== 2010 Human Development Report ==
The 2010 Human Development Report—The Real Wealth of Nations: Pathways to Human Development—showed through a detailed new analysis of long-term Human Development Index (HDI) trends that most developing countries made dramatic yet often underestimated progress in health, education and basic living standards in recent decades, with many of the poorest countries posting the greatest gains.

Yet patterns of achievement vary greatly, with some countries losing ground since 1970, the 2010 Human Development Report shows. Introducing three new indices, the 20th anniversary edition of the report documented wide inequalities within and among countries, deep disparities between women and men on a wide range of development indicators, and the prevalence of extreme multidimensional poverty in South Asia and sub-Saharan Africa. The new report also included a change in the methodology used to calculate the indexes using better statistical methods, as well as new parameters for judging the growth and development.

The first Human Development Report introduced its pioneering HDI and analyzed previous decades of development indicators, concluding that "there is no automatic link between economic growth and human progress." The 2010 Report's rigorous review of longer-term trends—looking back at HDI indicators for most countries from 1970—showed there is no consistent correlation between national economic performance and achievement in the non-income HDI areas of health and education.

Overall, as shown in the Report's analysis of all countries for which complete HDI data are available for the past 40 years, life expectancy climbed from 59 years in 1970 to 70 in 2010, school enrollment rose from just 55 percent of all primary and secondary school-age children to 70 percent, and per capita GDP doubled to more than US$10,000. People in all regions shared in this progress, though to varying degrees. Life expectancy, for example, rose by 18 years in the Arab states between 1970 and 2010, compared to eight years in sub-Saharan Africa. The 135 countries studied include 92 percent of the world's population.

The "Top 10 Movers" highlighted in the 2010 Report—those countries among the 135 that improved most in HDI terms over the past 40 years—were led by Oman, which invested energy earnings over the decades in education and public health.

The other nine "Top Movers" are China, Nepal, Indonesia, Saudi Arabia, Laos, Tunisia, South Korea, Algeria and Morocco. Remarkably, China was the only country that made the "Top 10" list due solely to income performance; the main drivers of HDI achievement were in health and education. The next 10 leaders in HDI improvement over the past 40 years include several low-income but high HID-achieving countries "not typically described as success stories," the Report notes, among them Ethiopia (#11), Cambodia (#15) and Benin (#18)—all of which made big gains in education and public health.

The 2010 Human Development Report continued the HDI tradition of measurement innovation by introducing new indices that address crucial development factors not directly reflected in the HDI:

- The Inequality-adjusted Human Development Index (IHDI): The 2010 Report examined HDI data through the lens of inequality, adjusting HDI achievements to reflect disparities in income, health and education.
- The Gender Inequality Index (GII): The 2010 Report introduced a new measure of gender inequities, including maternal mortality rates and women's representation in parliaments. The GII calculated national HDI losses from gender inequities, from the Netherlands (the most equal in GII terms) to Yemen (the least).
- The Multidimensional Poverty Index (MPI): The 2010 Report featured a new multidimensional poverty measure that complements income-based poverty assessments by looking at multiple factors at the household level, from basic living standards to access to schooling, clean water and health care. About 1.7 billion people—fully a third of the population in the 104 countries included in the MPI—are estimated to live in multidimensional poverty, more than the estimated 1.3 billion who live on $1.25 a day or less.

== 2020 Human Development Report ==
The 2020 report asserts that immense human pressures on the planet have ushered in a new geological epoch, the Anthropocene, or the Age of Humans. As such, the report introduces a new index to account for these pressures, the Planetary-Pressures Adjusted Human Development Index (PHDI), which includes a country's carbon dioxide emissions and material footprint. In his foreword to the report, UNDP Administrator Achim Steiner said that "humans wield more power over the planet than ever before. In the wake of COVID-19, record-breaking temperatures and spiraling inequality, it is time to use that power to redefine what we mean by progress, where our carbon and consumption footprints are no longer hidden."

Numerous highly developed wealthy countries plummeted as a result of their environmental impact, such as the United States, which dropped 45 places. By contrast, countries with lighter footprints such as Costa Rica, Moldova and Panama move up the index by roughly 30 places.

== 2025 Human Development Report ==
The 2025 Human Development Report examined what distinguishes the current era of artificial intelligence from previous digital transformations and what those differences could mean for human development. It considered how AI can enhance or subvert human agency, and how people are already interacting with AI in different ways at different stages of life.

The report emphasized that context and choices shape whether AI creates positive or negative outcomes. It warned that buying into AI hype can come at the expense of human agency, exacerbate exclusion and harm sustainability. The report also highlighted that who produces AI, and for what purposes, matters for everyone.

The report drew on a global survey conducted for the publication, which found that AI use was already substantial across all levels of the Human Development Index. According to the summary, about 20 percent of respondents were already using AI. About two-thirds of respondents in low, medium and high HDI countries expected to use AI in education, health and work within one year.

== List of global reports ==
- 1990: Concept and Measurement of Human Development
- 1991: Financing Human Development
- 1992: Global Dimensions of Human Development
- 1993: People's Participation
- 1994: New Dimensions of Human Security
- 1995: Gender and Human Development
- 1996: Economic Growth and Human Development
- 1997: Human Development to Eradicate Poverty
- 1998: Consumption for Human Development
- 1999: Globalization with a Human Face
- 2000: Human Rights and Human Development
- 2001: Making New Technologies Work for Human Development
- 2002: Deepening Democracy in a Fragmented World
- 2003: Millennium Development Goals: A Compact Among Nations to End Human Poverty
- 2004: Cultural Liberty in Today's Diverse World
- 2005: International cooperation at a crossroads: Aid, trade and security in an unequal world
- 2006: Beyond scarcity: Power, poverty and the global water crisis
- 2007–08: Fighting climate change: Human solidarity in a divided world
- 2009: Overcoming barriers: Human mobility and development
- 2010: The Real Wealth of Nations: Pathways to Human Development
- 2011: Sustainability and Equity: A Better Future for All
- 2013: The Rise of the South: Human Progress in a Diverse World
- 2014: Sustaining Human Progress: Reducing Vulnerabilities and Building Resilience
- 2015: Work for Human Development
- 2016: Human Development the Way ahead.
- 2018: Human Development Indices and Indicators.
- 2019: Beyond income, beyond averages, beyond today: Inequalities in human development in the 21st century
- 2020: The Next Frontier: Human Development and the Anthropocene
- 2021–22: Uncertain times, unsettled lives: Shaping our future in a transforming world
- 2023-24: Breaking the gridlock: Reimagining cooperation in a polarized world
- 2025: A matter of choice: People and possibilities in the age of AI

== See also ==
- Human development
- National Human Development Report
- Human Development Index
- OECD Better Life Index
- List of countries by Human Development Index
