= Social Institutions and Gender Index =

The Social Institutions and Gender Index (SIGI) is an index that measures discrimination against women. It solely focuses on social institutions which are formal and informal laws, social norms and customary practices that impact the roles of women. The SIGI is a multifaceted measure that focuses on four dimensions: Discrimination in the family, Restricted physical integrity, Restricted access to productive and financial resources, and Restricted civil liberties.

== Construction ==
SIGI is based on a selection of indicators from the Gender, Institutions and Development (GID) Database. It specifically draws on the GID's social institutions variables that are grouped into five categories or sub-indices: Family Code, Physical Integrity, Civil Liberties, Son Preference (measured as the incidence of missing women), and Ownership Rights. Family code delineates the social institutions that have an effect on a woman's power to make household decisions regarding their family. Variables of this sub-index include financial inheritance, parental authority and marriage rights. The civil liberties aspect focuses on women's freedom with respects to social participation. Its variables include freedoms such as dress, and ability to move outside of the home for women. Physical integrity includes variables that measure incidence of violence against women. Female genital mutilation, laws banning sexual assault or rape, sexual harassment, and domestic violence, and women who are reported missing are all variables included in this measure. Ownership rights focuses on the access women have to property. Whether or not women are allowed to own land and or houses and their access to bank loans and credit are foci under this sub-index. Son preference, also sometimes referred to as missing women, consists of variables looking at gender bias in mortality including human trafficking and missing person reports. The index is an unweighted average of these 5 sub-indices and measures on a scale from 0 to 1 the level of gender inequality in social institutions (higher levels indicate greater inequality). Each term in the SIGI formula is squared to allow for partial comparison. The indicators that compose the SIGI would yield uniformly high or even perfect scores for OECD member countries, given that legal discrimination against women is not present in most of these countries. However, significant gender inequality may nevertheless exist in OECD member countries; therefore, SIGI scores are only calculated for non-OECD countries to avoid misleading comparisons.

== Applications ==
Econometric analysis using the SIGI have shown the significant impact of social institutions on gender equality outcomes. For example, higher levels of gender inequality in social institutions are strongly correlated to lower participation of women in paid labor. However, higher levels of inequality are not necessarily associated with lower levels of per capita income. Some high-income countries in the Middle East and North Africa region, for example, have high levels of gender inequality. Education, on the other hand, seems to be a strong promoter of women's rights. The higher the percentage of women who can read and write, the lower the discrimination they suffer in social institutions.

== See also ==
- Gender equality
- Gender inequality
- Gender Parity Index
- Gender Empowerment Measure
- Gender Gap Index
- Gender-related Development Index

== Sources ==
- Boris Branisa, Stephan Klasen, Maria Ziegler, Denis Drechsler, and Johannes Jütting (2013): The institutional basis of gender inequality: the Social Institutions and Gender Index (SIGI). Feminist Economics, Published online: 11 Dec 2013.
- Boris Branisa, Stephan Klasen, and Maria Ziegler (2013): Gender Inequality in Social Institutions and Gendered Development Outcomes, World Development, Volume 45, May 2013, Pages 252–268
- Johannes Jütting, Christian Morrisson, Jeff Dayton Johnson, and Denis Drechsler (2008): Measuring Gender (In)Equality: The OECD Gender, Institutions and Development Data Base, Journal of Human Development, Volume 9, Issue 1 March 2008, pages 65 – 86.
