= GID =

GID (or Gid, gid) may refer to:

== Gender-related ==
- Gender identity disorder
- Gender, Institutions and Development Data Base, OECD gender-related data

== People ==
- Gid (Book of Mormon), Nephite military officer
- Gid Gardner (1859–1914), American baseball player
- Gid Tanner (1885–1960), American musician

== Other ==
- Gid, Arkansas, United States, an unincorporated community
- Coenurosis, a parasitic tapeworm infection, primarily of sheep
- General Intelligence Directorate (disambiguation)
- Geneva International Discussions, international negotiations about Georgia (the country)
- Gidar language, spoken in Cameroon and Chad
- Gitega Airport, in Burundi
- Grazing incidence diffraction, use of X-rays etc. to analyse surfaces
- Great icosidodecahedron, a geometrical figure
- Group identifier, on Unix-like systems
- National Weather Service Hastings, Nebraska, a National Weather Service forecast office (WFO ID GID)

== See also ==
- Gide
- GIDS (disambiguation)
- GYD (disambiguation)
