= Gide =

Gide is a French surname. Notable people with the surname include:

- André Gide (1869–1951), French author
- Catherine Gide (1923–2013), French author and daughter of André Gide
- Charles Gide (1847–1932), French economist and uncle of André Gide

== See also ==
- Gide River, river in Sweden
- 11298 Gide, main-belt asteroid
- Guide (disambiguation)
- Gid (disambiguation)
