= Gender Empowerment Measure =

Index to measure gender equality

The Gender Empowerment Measure (GEM) is an index designed to measure gender equality. GEM is the United Nations Development Programme's attempt to measure the extent of gender inequality across the globe's countries, based on estimates of women's relative economic income, participation in high-paying positions with economic power, and access to professional and parliamentary positions. It was introduced at the same time as the Gender-related Development Index (GDI) but measures topics like empowerment that are not covered by that index. Since it was first adopted, the GEM has been employed in several academic studies related to empowerment as a reliable metric for comparing gender empowerment across different countries. It has also faced some harsh criticisms, and many alterations and alternatives have been proposed.

== History ==
The United Nations created the Gender Empowerment Measure as an addition to their Human Development Index in 1995.

In 1995 in the Human Development Report commissioned by the United Nations Development Program set-out to create two new measurement indices for measuring development. Their aim was to add to the Human Development Index by way of including a gender dimension in the measure. They were created in order to rival the traditional income-focused measures of development such as the Gross Domestic Product (GDP) and the Gross National Product (GNP). Mahbub ul Haq, the first director of the Human Development Report Office, established several principles for the newly emerging measure including provisions that it had to be simple, had to be represented as a single number, had to be easily calculated, had to yield numbers that were internationally comparable, had to use numbers available on a yearly basis and had to use numbers that were easily interpretable. The resulting measures that were created were the Gender-related Development Index (GDI) and the Gender Empowerment Measure (GEM). The GEM, the more specialized of the two, is focused on indicating the relative empowerment of women in a given country.

== Definition and calculation ==
The GEM was designed to measure "whether women and men are able to actively participate in economic and political life and take part in decision-making" (UNDP, 1995, p. 73)(Klasen 257). The GEM tends to be more agency-focused (what people are actually able to do) than well-being-focused (how people feel or fare in the grand scheme of things). The GEM is determined using three basic indicators: Proportion of seats held by women in national parliaments, percentage of women in economic decision making positions (incl. administrative, managerial, professional and technical occupations) and female share of income (earned incomes of males vs. females). The GEM is thought to be a valuable policy instrument because it allows certain dimensions that were previously difficult to compare between countries to come into international comparison.

=== Applications of calculations ===
One way the GEM has been employed is as a metric in academic research on comparative gender politics. For example, a study by Dr. Michael M.O. Seipel used the GEM to test the hypothesis that countries with less female representation in government will have spending rates that reflect more traditionally masculine values than do countries with more equal gender representation. Seiple took higher GEM to indicate more female representation in government. The study found that Seipel's hypothesis was correct: the higher a country's GEM score, the higher its rate of spending on domestic programs like education and health care, which are correlated with traditional feminine values. Inversely, countries with low GEM scores had higher rates of military spending, which correlate with traditional masculine values.

Professor Leah E. Ruppanner used the 2004 GEM in to study the relationship between women's empowerment and women's share of housework in countries around the world. "Cross-national reports of housework: An investigation of the gender empowerment measure" concludes that the GEM and the elements that comprise it are key to understanding the proportional breakdown of housework between men and women. However, the total GEM and its compositional elements, Ruppanner warns, are not to be used interchangeably.

In 2011, Professors Sara C. Hitchman and Geoffrey T. Fong used the GEM in a study they conducted at the University of Waterloo entitled "Gender empowerment and female-to-male smoking prevalence ratios". Employing the GEM as their metric for a country's level of gender empowerment, they found that, as countries increase in gender empowerment, the gap in smoking rates between men and women shrinks. While countries with low GEM ratings see far more men than women smoke, higher empowerment is correlated with higher smoking levels among women, much closer to that of the men in their country.

== Debates ==
As time passes, and these measures (the GDI and the GEM) are applied year after year, debate has arisen over whether or not they have been as influential in promoting gender-sensitive development as was hoped when they were first created. Some of the major criticisms of both measures include that they are highly specialized and difficult to interpret, often misinterpreted, suffer from large data gaps, do not provide accurate comparisons across countries, and try to combine too many development factors into a single measure. The concern then arises that if these indices are not well-informed, then their numbers might hide more than they reveal.

In terms of the GEM in particular, it is often said to represent an elite bias. It has been accused of measuring inequality only among the most educated and economically advantaged women and to focus mainly on the higher echelons of society. Women in grassroots organizations or at the local political level are not reflected, as well as work in lower levels of employment or in the informal sector, where many women in poor and developing countries are forced to seek employment. Additionally, the GEM has been criticized for not taking into account the limitations on or differences in women's empowerment within certain religious and cultural contexts. Professor Jawad Syed calls this the GEM's "secular bias."

Furthermore, statistical information (data) is not very readily available for many of the indicators in the GEM. Not many less-developed countries collect reliable data on women's involvement in economic participation or labor involvement. As a result, the GEM is only reliable for very highly developed countries which do collect those statistics. It is also often argued that the number of women in parliament isn't an adequate indication of gender empowerment progress in a given country because many times feminists are considered political liabilities, and as such, female politicians do not always promote female interests. On the other hand, however, information regarding the number of parliamentary seats held by women is very easy to obtain, and very hard to alter, making it one of the more reliable sources of data in the measure. Another criticism of the GEM is its failure to address the issue of female control over their bodies and sexuality, which some argue is an important source of female empowerment and as such should be included in the measure. Additionally, the GEM has also been criticized for being far too dependent on the income component of the measure for determining the overall GEM score.

== Suggestions for improving ==
=== Suggested alterations ===
Many suggestions have been made to alter the GEM. It has been suggested that the GEM be altered to include female representation in local government instead of only national government to make it less elite. Furthermore, it has been recommended that it should be revised to reflect female participation in political activities such as voting. Additionally, it has been recommended that a component regarding women's control over their own bodies and sexuality be added by measuring the availability of birth control and the right to abortion. In fact, some have suggested that there is not enough consideration of women's health as a whole in the current GEM. It has been suggested that including infant mortality rate of females (IMR-F) and maternal mortality rate (MMR) be included in the calculations, as they are better suited to indicate women's health and lifecycle than is the more general life expectancy at birth (LEB) measure. It has also been suggested that the GEM could be altered to include the proportion of females who are in extreme poverty as opposed to the proportion of parliamentary positions held by females. Lastly, it has been suggested that the GEM could be altered to include female levels of unemployment. Other suggestions include coming up with different ways to deal with the earned income part so as to make it a more straightforward mode of measurement.

==== Applications of alterations ====
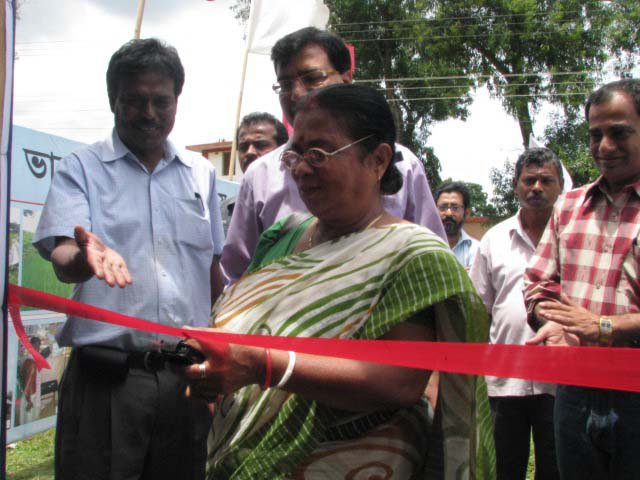
Chhaya Sarkar, a woman chair of a Panchayat Samiti (local Indian legislature), opens a new photo exhibition.

In some developing countries where the aforementioned shortcomings of the GEM are especially pronounced, subnational calculations are made differently in order to produce a more accurate representation of women's empowerment. For example, while the number of women in national Indian parliament may be slim, there are more women in local-level government who would be unaccounted for. Thus many Indian states use local level parliamentary numbers when calculating their GEM and overall Human Development Reports (HDR).

Another example of these local-level alterations is agricultural wages and employment. Agriculture accounts for a large share of women's employment in the developing world. To account for this in the GEM, West Bengal's 2004 HDR, for example, includes rural agricultural employment in its GEM calculations, whereas typically a GEM equation would only include non-agricultural wages. This alteration allows for a more representative and accurate GEM.

=== Suggested alternatives ===
Suggestions have also been made to replace the GEM as a whole. One such suggestion is the calculation of separate Human Development Indexes for males and females which would provide a more straightforward picture of gender inequality (first suggested by Halis Akder in 1994). Another suggestion is to create a Gender-Gap Measure. In 2003 Charmes and Wieringa came up with the Women's Empowerment Matrix which considers six spheres (physical, sociocultural, religious, political, legal and economic) as well as six levels: individual, household, community, state, regional, and global. The GEE is another suggested alternative to the GEM, this measure would include a legal framework and protection of women's rights, as well as other important areas of women's empowerment that are overlooked by the GEM like women's movements, public attitudes, and equal rights. Lastly, in the 2010 Human Development Report, a new measuring mechanism was created entitled the Gender Inequality Index. This new experimental measure considers three dimensions: Reproductive health, empowerment, and labor market participation which aim to ameliorate some of the problems associated with the GEM.

== See also ==
- Gender equality
- Gender inequality
- Gender Parity Index
- Gender-related Development Index
- Human Development Index
- Global Gender Gap Report
- Social Institutions and Gender Index
- Human Poverty Index
- National Human Development Report
- UN Women
