= Composite measure =

Composite measure in statistics and research design refer to composite measures of variables, i.e. measurements based on multiple data items.

An example of a composite measure is an IQ test, which gives a single score based on a series of responses to various questions.

Three common composite measures include:

- indexes - measures that summarize and rank specific observations, usually on the ordinal scale;
- scales - advanced indexes whose observations are further transformed (scaled) due to their logical or empirical relationships;
- typologies - measures that classify observations in terms of their attributes on multiple variables, usually on a nominal scale.

== Indexes versus scales ==
Indexes are often referred to as scales, but in fact not all indexes are scales.

Whereas indexes are usually created by aggregating scores assigned to individual attributes of various variables, scales are more nuanced and take into account differences in intensity among the attribute of the same variable in question. Indexes and scales should provide an ordinal ranking of cases on a given variable, though scales are usually more efficient at this. While indexes are based on a simple aggregation of indicators of a variable, scales are more advanced, and their calculations may be more complex, using for example scaling procedures such as semantic differential.

== Composite measure validation ==
A good composite measure will ensure that the indicators are independent of one another. It should also successfully predict other indicators of the variable.
