= Social Watch =

Non-governmental organization in Uruguay

- Founded: 1995
- Type: Transnational alternative policy group, watchdog organization
- Purpose: Poverty, social inequality, racism, gender justice
- Location: Montevideo, Uruguay
- Website: www.socialwatch.org

Social Watch is a non-governmental organization that was established in 1995. Its secretariat and coordinating personnel is hosted by the Third World Institute, whose international seat is based in Montevideo, Uruguay.

Adopting a critical-liberal stance, Social Watch is focused on:

1. the eradication of poverty and the causes of poverty,
2. an end to all forms of discrimination and racism,
3. an equitable distribution of wealth, and
4. the realization of human rights, emphasizing ‘the right of all people not to be poor’.

On these fronts, Social Watch engages both United Nations-sponsored and related intergovernmental initiatives that address global governance issues, as well as simultaneously coordinating a vast network of grassroots activist—so-called ‘Watchers’ (over 80 in both North and South)--that monitor compliance with international covenants.

The practice of ‘Watching’ involves documenting and reporting on events, or failures to act (a kind of alternative journalism). News generated by Watchers in various countries is regularly updated on the Social Watch website. Each year, their reports are also condensed and compiled into an overall Social Watch Report, widely distributed in intergovernmental and non-governmental organization circles, as well as back to the grassroots communities of Watchers.

== Publications ==
In 2011, Social Watch released the Basic Capabilities Index, a report on global development and human well-being.

In 2012, it published its most recent Gender Equity Index, one of the measures of gender equality.

In 2014, it published its annual Report, "Means and Ends."
