= GIDS =

GIDS or Gids may refer to:

- De Gids, Dutch literary periodical
- German Institute for Defence and Strategic Studies, a think tank of the German Armed Forces
- Global Industrial Defence Solutions, a Pakistani arms company
- Graded Intergenerational Disruption Scale, used for measuring language vitality
- Graduate Institute of Development Studies, educational institute in Switzerland
- NHS Gender Identity Development Service, a UK clinic for children with gender identity issues

== See also ==
- GID (disambiguation)
