= Gender Inequality Index =

United Nations index for gender inequality

Countries by Gender Inequality Index (Data from 2019, published in 2020). Red denotes more gender inequality, and green more equality.

The Gender Inequality Index (GII) is an index for the measurement of gender disparity that was introduced in the 2010 Human Development Report 20th anniversary edition by the United Nations Development Programme (UNDP). According to the UNDP, this index is a composite measure to quantify the loss of achievement within a country due to gender inequality. It uses three dimensions to measure opportunity cost: reproductive health, empowerment, and labor market participation. The new index was introduced as an experimental measure to remedy the shortcomings of the previous indicators, the Gender Development Index (GDI) and the Gender Empowerment Measure (GEM), both of which were introduced in the 1995 Human Development Report.

== Origins ==
As international recognition of the importance of eliminating gender inequality was growing, the Gender Development Index (GDI) and the Gender Empowerment Measure (GEM) were introduced in the 1995 Human Development Report. The GDI and GEM became the primary indices for measuring global gender inequality for the United Nations Human Development Reports. The GDI and GEM faced criticism for their methodological and conceptual limitations.

Lourdes Beneria and Iñaki Permanyer have explained that the GDI and GEM are not measurements of gender inequality in and of themselves. The GDI is a composite index which measures development within a country and then negatively corrects for gender inequality; and the GEM measures the access women have to attaining means of power in economics, politics, and making decisions. Both of which Beneria and Permanyer claim are inaccurate in clearly capturing gender inequality. The GDI fails to include measuring the position of women as compared to men in society, even if it shows the human development costs of gender inequalities in basic human development. Schüler also notes that both the GEM and GDI failed to create any recognition for gender inequality, and the continuance of gender disparities kept going internationally. According to the UNDP, the GDI was criticized for its inability to accurately measure gender inequality for its components being too closely related to the Human Development Index (HDI), a composite measure of human development used by the UNDP.

Thus, the differences between the HDI and GDI were small leading to the implication that gender disparities were irrelevant to human development. The UNDP also claims that both the GDI and GEM were criticized because income levels tended to dominate the earned income component, which resulted in countries with low income levels not being able to get high scores, even in cases where their levels of gender inequality may have been low. The GEM indicators proved to be more relevant to developed countries than less-developed countries. With international growing concern for gender equality, the participants of the World Economic Forum in 2007, among others, recognized that the advancement of women was a significant issue that impacted the growth of nations.

As of 2006, the World Economic Forum has been using the Gender Gap Index (GGI) in its Global Gender Gap Reports, which ranks countries according to their gender gaps, in an attempt to better capture gender disparities. Beneria and Permanyer criticize the GGI for only capturing inequality in certain aspects of women's lives therefore making it an incomplete measure of gender inequality.

Given the amount of criticism the GDI and GEM were facing, the UNDP felt that these indices did not fully capture the differences between gender. In an attempt to reform the GDI and GEM, the UNDP introduced the Gender Inequality Index (GII) in the 2010 Human Development Report. The new index is a composite measure which, according to the UNDP, captures the loss of achievement due to gender inequality using three dimensions: reproductive health, empowerment, and labor market participation. The GII does not include income levels as a component, which was one of the most controversial components of the GDI and GEM. It also does not allow for high achievements in one dimension to compensate for low achievement in another.

== Dimensions ==
There are three critical dimensions to the GII: reproductive health, empowerment, and labor market participation. The dimensions are captured in one synthetic index, as to account for joint significance. According to the UNDP, none of the measures in the dimensions pertain to the country's development and therefore a less-developed country can perform well if gender inequality is low. The UNDP considers the dimensions complementary in that inequality in one dimension tends to affect inequality in another. Therefore, the GII captures association across dimensions, making the index association-sensitive, and ensuring that high achievement in one dimension does not compensate for low achievement in another dimension.

=== Reproductive health ===
Permanyer notes that the GII is a pioneering index, in that it is the first index to include reproductive health indicators as a measurement for gender inequality. The GII's dimension of reproductive health have two indicators: the Maternal Mortality Ratio (MMR), the data for which come UNICEF's State of the World's Children, and the adolescent fertility rate (AFR), the data for which is obtained through the UN Department of Economic and Social Affairs, respectively. With a low MMR, it is implied that pregnant women have access to adequate health needs, therefore the MMR is a good measure of women's access to health care. The UNDP expresses that women's health during pregnancy and childbearing is a clear sign of women's status in society.

A high AFR, which measures early childbearing, results in health risks for mothers and infants as well as a lack of higher education attainment. According to the UNDP data, reproductive health accounts for the largest loss due to gender inequality, among all regions.

=== Empowerment ===
The empowerment dimension is measured by two indicators: the share of parliamentary seats held by each sex, which is obtained from the International Parliamentary Union, and higher education attainment levels, which is obtained through United Nations Educational, Scientific and Cultural Organization (UNESCO) and Barro-Lee data sets. The GII index of higher education evaluates women's attainment to secondary education and above. Access to higher education expands women's freedom by increasing their ability to question and increases their access to information which expands their public involvement.

There is much literature that finds women's access to education may reduce the AFR and child mortality rates within a country. Due to data limitations the parliament representation indicator is limited to national parliament and excludes local government or other community involvement. Although women's representation in parliament has been increasing women have been disadvantaged in representation of parliament with a global average of only 16%.

=== Labor market participation ===
The labor market dimension is measured by women's participation in the workforce. This dimension accounts for paid work, unpaid work, and actively looking for work. The data for this dimension is obtained through the International Labour Organization databases. Due to data limitations women's income and unpaid work are not represented in the labor market dimension of GII. In the absence of reliable earned income data across countries, the UNDP considers labor market participation a suitable substitute for economic aspects of gender inequality.

== Calculations ==
The metrics of the GII are similar in calculations to the Inequality-adjusted Human Development Index (IHDI), which was also introduced in the 2010 Human Development Report, and can be interpreted as a percentage loss of human development due to shortcomings in the included dimensions. The value of GII range between 0 and 1, with 0 being 0% inequality, indicating women fare equally in comparison to men and 1 being 100% inequality, indicating women fare poorly in comparison to men. There is a correlation between GII ranks and human development distribution, according to the UNDP countries that exhibit high gender inequality also show inequality in distribution of development, and vice versa.

The GII is an association-sensitive, responsive to distributional changes across dimension, composite index used to rank the loss of development through gender inequality within a country. The GII measures inequalities by addressing the shortcomings of other measures through aggregate strategy using multiple correspondence analysis (MCA) in order to avoid aggregation problems. There are five steps to computing the gender inequality Index.

Step 1: Treating zeros and extreme values: The maternal mortality rate is truncated systematically at minimum of 10 and maximum of 1,000. The maximum and minimum is based on the normative assumption that all countries with maternal mortality ratios above 1,000 do not differ in their ability to support for maternal health as well as the assumption that all countries below 10 do not differ in their abilities. Countries with parliamentary representation reporting at 0 are counted as 0.1 because of the assumption that women have some level of political influence and that the geometric mean can not have a 0 value.

Step 2: Aggregating across dimensions within each gender group, using geometric means: Aggregating across dimensions for each gender group by the geometric mean makes the GII association-sensitive. The maternal mortality rate and the adolescent fertility rate are only relevant for females the males are only aggregated with the other two dimensions.

Step 3: Aggregating across gender groups, using a harmonic mean: To compute the equally distributed gender index the female and male indices are aggregated by the harmonic mean of the geometric means to capture the inequality between females and males and adjust for association between dimensions.

Step 4: Calculating the geometric mean of the arithmetic means for each indicator: Obtain the reference standard by aggregating female and male indices with equal weight, and then aggregating indices across dimensions.

Reproductive health is not an average of female and male indices but half the distance from the norms established

Step 5: Calculating the Gender Inequality Index: To compute the GII compare the equally distributed gender index from Step 3 to the reference standard from Step 4.

=== Changes in 2011 calculations ===
According to the UNDP there was a minor calculation change to the 2011 Gender Inequality Index from the 2010 index used. The maternal mortality ratio was calculated in the Gender Inequality Index at 10 even though the range of GII values should be between 0 and 1. To correct this the maternal mortality ratio is normalized by 10, which generally reduced the values of the GII.

== Rankings ==
As there is no country with perfect gender equality, all countries suffer some loss of human development due to gender inequality. The difference in dimensions used in the GII and HDI means that the GII is not interpreted as a loss of HDI, but has its own rank and value separate from the HDI. The GII is interpreted as a percentage and indicates the percentage of potential human development lost due to gender inequality. The world average GII score in 2011 was 0.492, which indicates a 49.2% loss in potential human development due to gender inequality. Due to the limitations of data and data quality, the 2010 Human Development Report calculated GII rankings of 138 countries for the year 2008. The 2011 Human Development Report was able to calculate the GII rankings of 146 countries for the reporting year 2011.

The 2019 rankings for all scored countries based on UNDP GII data are:

Table

GII Rank	HDI Rank	Country	GII Value
1	2	Switzerland	0.025
2	1	Norway	0.038
3	11	Finland	0.039
4	8	Netherlands	0.043
4	10	Denmark	0.043
6	7	Sweden	0.045
6	14	Belgium	0.045
7	23	South Korea	0.047
8	26	France	0.049
9	4	Iceland	0.058
10	22	Slovenia	0.063
11	23	Taiwan	0.064
12	23	Luxembourg	0.065
12	11	Singapore	0.065
14	18	Austria	0.069
14	29	Italy	0.069
16	25	Spain	0.070
17	19	Japan	0.075
18	38	Portugal	0.079
19	19	Canada	0.080
20	6	Germany	0.084
21	33	Cyprus	0.086
21	29	Estonia	0.086
23	2	Ireland	0.093
24	16	New Zealand	0.094
25	8	Australia	0.097
26	15	United Kingdom	0.109
26	48	Montenegro	0.109
28	35	Poland	0.115
29	32	Greece	0.116
29	43	Croatia	0.116
31	31	United Arab Emirates	0.118
31	53	Belarus	0.118
33	14	Israel	0.123
34	34	Lithuania	0.124
35	64	Serbia	0.132
36	27	Czech Republic	0.136
37	82	North Macedonia	0.143
38	73	Bosnia and Herzegovina	0.149
39	85	China	0.168
40	28	Malta	0.175
41	37	Latvia	0.176
42	69	Albania	0.181
43	45	Qatar	0.185
44	51	Kazakhstan	0.190
45	39	Slovakia	0.191
46	17	United States	0.204
46	90	Moldova	0.204
48	56	Bulgaria	0.206
49	42	Bahrain	0.212
50	52	Russia	0.225
51	40	Hungary	0.233
52	74	Ukraine	0.234
53	64	Kuwait	0.242
54	81	Armenia	0.245
55	43	Chile	0.247
56	105	Libya	0.252
56	40	Saudi Arabia	0.252
56	58	Barbados	0.252
59	62	Malaysia	0.253
60	47	Brunei	0.255
61	49	Romania	0.276
62	55	Uruguay	0.288
62	106	Uzbekistan	0.288
62	62	Costa Rica	0.288
65	95	Tunisia	0.296
65	117	Vietnam	0.296
67	70	Cuba	0.304
68	60	Oman	0.306
68	54	Turkey	0.306
70	125	Tajikistan	0.314
71	99	Mongolia	0.322
71	74	Mexico	0.322
73	88	Azerbaijan	0.323
73	67	Trinidad and Tobago	0.323
75	46	Argentina	0.328
76	61	Georgia	0.331
77	58	Bahamas	0.341
78	66	Mauritius	0.347
79	104	Tonga	0.354
80	79	Thailand	0.359
81	111	Samoa	0.360
82	95	Maldives	0.369
82	120	Kyrgyzstan	0.369
84	93	Fiji	0.370
85	124	El Salvador	0.383
86	86	Ecuador	0.384
87	79	Peru	0.395
88	101	Jamaica	0.396
89	126	Cape Verde	0.397
90	86	Saint Lucia	0.401
90	72	Sri Lanka	0.401
92	160	Rwanda	0.402
93	114	South Africa	0.406
94	57	Panama	0.407
95	84	Brazil	0.408
96	92	Lebanon	0.411
97	110	Belize	0.415
98	107	Bolivia	0.417
99	129	Bhutan	0.421
100	132	Honduras	0.423
101	83	Colombia	0.428
101	128	Nicaragua	0.428
103	91	Algeria	0.429
104	107	Philippines	0.430
105	97	Suriname	0.436
106	130	Namibia	0.440
107	103	Paraguay	0.446
108	116	Egypt	0.449
109	102	Jordan	0.450
110	142	Nepal	0.452
111	121	Morocco	0.454
112	88	Dominican Republic	0.455
113	137	Laos	0.459
113	70	Iran	0.459
115	122	Guyana	0.462
116	100	Botswana	0.465
117	144	Cambodia	0.474
118	147	Myanmar	0.478
119	113	Venezuela	0.479
119	127	Guatemala	0.479
121	107	Indonesia	0.480
122	151	Syria	0.482
123	131	India	0.488
124	185	Burundi	0.504
125	173	Ethiopia	0.517
126	143	Kenya	0.518
127	181	Mozambique	0.523
128	119	Gabon	0.525
129	150	Zimbabwe	0.527
130	168	Senegal	0.533
131	159	Uganda	0.535
132	148	Angola	0.536
133	135	Sao Tome and Principe	0.537
133	133	Bangladesh	0.537
135	138	Ghana	0.538
135	154	Pakistan	0.538
137	146	Zambia	0.539
138	170	Sudan	0.545
139	165	Lesotho	0.553
140	163	Tanzania	0.556
141	153	Cameroon	0.560
142	174	Malawi	0.565
143	138	Eswatini	0.567
144	149	Republic of the Congo	0.570
145	167	Togo	0.573
146	123	Iraq	0.577
147	182	Burkina Faso	0.594
148	158	Benin	0.612
148	172	Gambia	0.612
150	175	Democratic Republic of the Congo	0.617
151	157	Mauritania	0.634
152	170	Haiti	0.636
153	162	Ivory Coast	0.638
154	189	Niger	0.642
155	182	Sierra Leone	0.644
156	175	Liberia	0.650
157	169	Afghanistan	0.655
158	184	Mali	0.671
159	188	Central African Republic	0.680
160	187	Chad	0.710
161	155	Papua New Guinea	0.725
162	179	Yemen	0.795

=== Top ten countries ===
The ten highest-ranked countries in terms of gender equality according to the GII for 2008, 2011, and 2012.

2018 rank and value, source: http://hdr.undp.org/en/content/table-5-gender-inequality-index-gii.

2018: 9th is Iceland, 10th is Republic of Korea.

Country	GII Rank (GII value) 2018	GII Rank 2012	GII Value 2012	HDI Rank 2012	GII Rank 2011	GII Value 2011	GII Rank 2008	GII Value 2008
Netherlands	4 (0.041)	1	0.045	4	2	0.052	1	0.174
Sweden	2 (0.040)	2	0.055	7	1	0.049	3	0.212
Denmark	2 (0.040)	3	0.057	15	3	0.060	2	0.209
Switzerland	1 (0.037)	4	0.057	9	4	0.067	4	0.228
Norway	5 (0.044)	5	0.065	1	6	0.075	5	0.234
Finland	7 (0.050)	6	0.075	21	5	0.075	8	0.248
Germany	9 (0.084)	7	0.075	5	7	0.085	7	0.240
South Korea	7 (0.048)	8	0.08	7	8	0.078	8	0.198
France	8 (0.051)	10	0.083	20	10	0.106	11	0.260
Belgium	6 (0.045)	9	0.068	*	*	*	*	GHS

==== Regions not included ====
Region	GII Rank 2012	GII Value 2012	HDI Rank 2012	GII Rank 2011	GII Value 2011	GII Rank 2008	GII Value 2008
Republic of China (Taiwan)	2	0.053	23	4	0.061	4	0.223

=== Bottom ten countries ===
The ten lowest ranked countries in terms of gender equality according to the GII for 2008, 2011, and 2012.

2018 rank and value, source: http://hdr.undp.org/en/content/table-5-gender-inequality-index-gii.

Country	GII Rank (GII value) 2018	GII Value 2012	HDI Rank 2012	GII Rank 2011	GII Value 2011	GII Rank 2008	GII Value 2008
Yemen	162 (0.834)	0.823	160	--	--	--	--
Afghanistan	143 (0.575)	0.712	175	141	0.717	134	0.797
Niger	154 (0.647)	0.707	186	144	0.724	136	0.807
Congo	156 (0.655)	0.681	186	142	0.710	169	0.814
Liberia	155 (0.651)	0.658	174	139	0.671	131	0.766
Central African Republic	159 (0.682)	0.654	180	138	0.669	132	0.768
Mali	158 (0.676)	0.649	182	143	0.712	135	0.799
Sierra Leone	153 (0.644)	0.643	177	137	0.662	125	0.756
Mauritania	150 (0.620)	0.643	155	--	--	--	--

== Criticisms ==
The GII is a relatively new index that has only been in use since 2010. Criticisms of the GII as a global measurement of gender inequality include that the GII may inadequately capture gender inequality, leave out important aspects, or include unnecessary dimensions, and the complexity of GII causes difficulty for some to interpret or calculate.

=== Asymmetry ===
The GII measures losses in human development specifically due to disadvantages faced by women, not men. This means that if a country has higher parliamentary representation of woman than men (such as Cuba, Nicaragua, and Rwanda), or poorer secondary education outcomes (such as the United States and Sweden), the GII will measure this as being closer to gender equality. This asymmetrical focus on women's disadvantage has been criticised for making male disadvantage invisible. A focus only on the reproductive health of women, with the assumption that men's health is perfect, also ignores health issues more commonly faced by men.

=== Complexity ===
Klasen and Schüler as well as Permanyer argue that the complexity of the GII will make it difficult to interpret or understand for the professionals who would likely want to make use of it because so many non-linear procedures are applied to the data. Permanyer believes that simplicity is required in order for analysts, policy-makers, or practitioners to convey a clear message to the general public.

Klasen and Schüler claim that the GII is meant to represent a loss of human development, but the standard against which the losses are measured is not stated anywhere, unlike the GDI where the losses were measured against the HDI, making the HDI represent perfect equality. The UNDP explains that the complexity of the calculations are needed in order to maintain an association-sensitive measure, but Permanyer argues that alternative indices that are much less complex have also shown to be association sensitive.

=== Proposal for a Subnational Index ===
While Klasen Schuler and Permanyer argue that the GII is too complex, Shmid, Cook and Jones counter that argument with the notion that the current GII is too broad. Shmid, Cook and Jones analyze the GII and how impactful it is for Great Britain and come to the conclusion that there is no measure of gender disparities at the subnational level, leaving the GII being too broad overall.

Shmid, Cook and Jones claim that there are difficulties when measuring gender disparities through quantitative data, and that there is a lack of measuring what is important when it comes to gender inequality. These authors state that a proposal for a subnational index including the domains of Paid Work, Money, Power & Participation, Education & Skills, and Unpaid Work will bring a more accurate measurement to gender disparities to Great Britain.

=== Mix of indices ===
Both Klasen and Schüler as well as Permanyer argue that the GII mixes indices in a few ways which furthers the complexity and poses other issues. The measurement combines well-being and empowerment which becomes problematic in that it increases the complexity, lacks transparency, and suffers from the problem of using an arithmetic means of ratios. Permanyer argues that it also combines two different, absolute and relative, indicators within the same formula. For example, if the MMR is higher than 10 per 100,000 it is considered inequality. Yet, parliamentary representation is only considered inequality if there is a deviation from 50 percent. Therefore, if women and men fare equally in all dimensions the GII would not equal a zero value as it should. Permanyer gives an example for this problem:

Consider a hypothetical country with PRf = PRm, SEf = SEm, LFPRf = LFPRm and with the lowest MMR and AFR observed in the sample of countries for which data is available (MMR = 10, AFR = 3.8). In that case, that hypothetical country would have a GII value well above 0 (GII approximately 0.15).

=== Formula Shortcomings ===
According to both Mcdonald and Koblitz, the GII formula has some issues that could be improved, the major issue being that it is composed of two indicators, maternal mortalities and teen pregnancies. Mcdonald and Koblitz also claim the product of the formula mainly clusters the values towards zero, which for lower-income countries, can make these countries seem to have more issues with gender inequality than reality. The authors claim the formula weighs too heavily on reproductive health causing disproportionate data towards poorer countries. Both Mcdonald and Koblitz believe the GII's formula has a bias towards richer countries and think that the formula should focus on other factors of gender disparity.

=== Regional relevance ===
Permanyer also criticizes the GII for whether or not its assessment of gender inequality, and uses of the same set of indicators, are equally relevant or meaningful across all regions of the Globe. For less-developed countries the use of the MMR and AFR in the dimension of reproductive health may be penalizing although the loss may not be entirely explained by gender inequality. Less-developed countries performance in the reproductive health dimension may differ regionally or locally. Access to or use of health services can be influenced by socio-economic levels, public health policies, or social and cultural practices. In developed countries, specifically European countries, gender inequality levels are not very "robust to alternative specifications of gender-related indicators" and analysts and policy makers may choose specific methods to yield desired results.

=== Choice of variables ===
Klasen and Schüler briefly criticize the GII for its failure to capture the informal work and unpaid domestic or care work where women are primarily over-represented. In many underdeveloped societies women and girls spend the majority of their time in domestic work whereas men and boys spend far less, if any. Therefore, the if the GII doesn't capture the time women spend in unpaid labor, it is insufficient to capture the true global disparities of women.

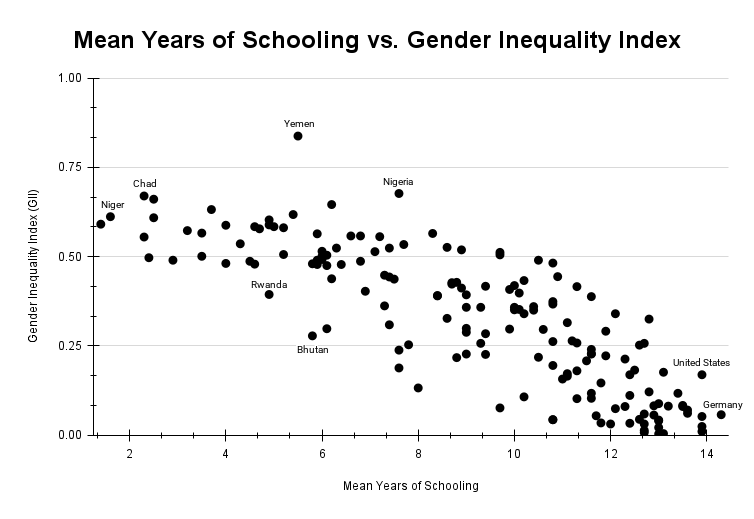
Scatter plot showing the relationship between mean years of schooling and the Gender Inequality Index (GII). Data from the UNDP Human Development Report (2023). Only selected countries are labeled.

== See also ==
- Gender Development Index
- Gender Empowerment Measure
- Global Gender Gap Report
- Gender Inequalities in Liberia
- Human Development Index
- Human Development Report
- Multiple Correspondence Analysis
- United Nations Development Programme
- Women in Africa
- Women in Islam
- Women Peace and Security Index
