= Global Gender Gap Report =

Index designed to measure gender equality

The Global Gender Gap Report is an index designed to measure gender equality. It was first published in 2006 by the World Economic Forum.

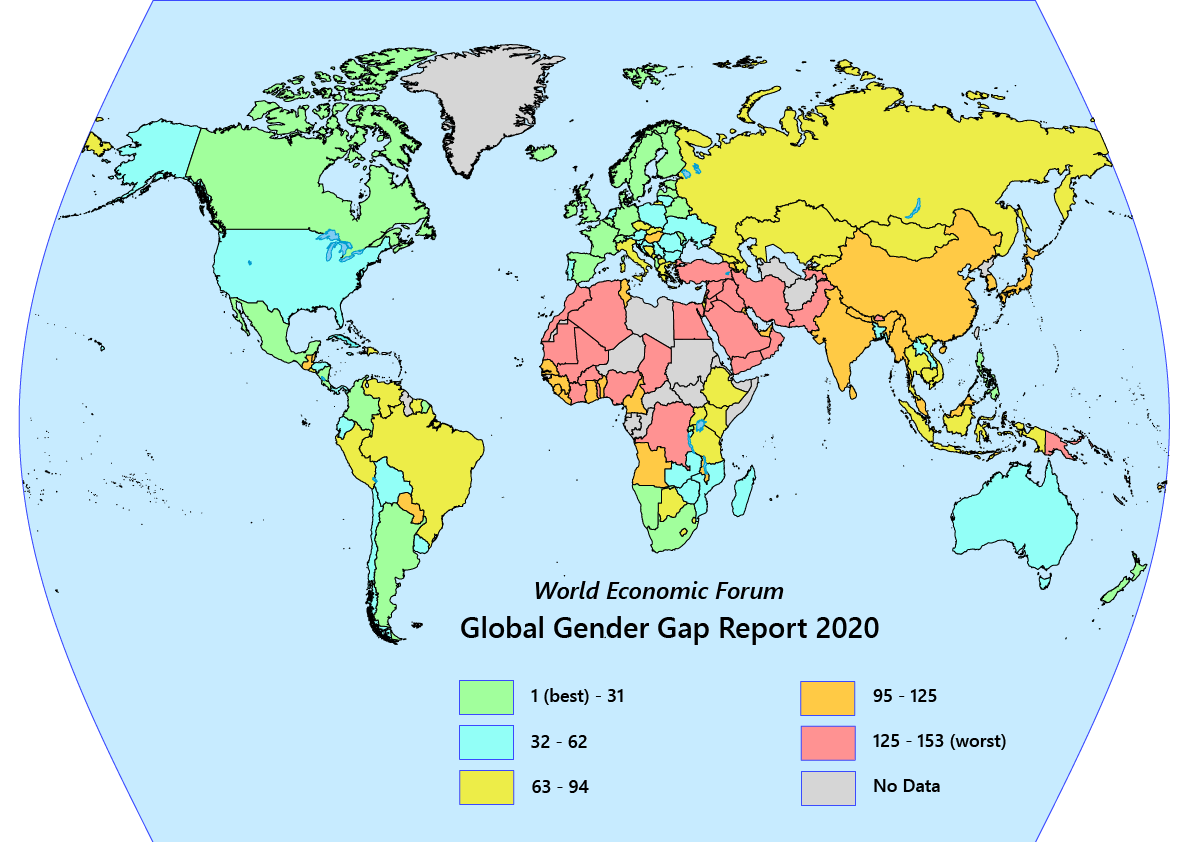
Global Gender Gap Report 2020

It "assesses countries on how well they are dividing their resources and opportunities among their male and female populations, regardless of the overall levels of these resources and opportunities," the Report says. "By providing a comprehensible framework for assessing and comparing global gender gaps and by revealing those countries that are role models in dividing these resources equitably between women and men, the Report serves as a catalyst for greater awareness as well as greater exchange between policymakers."

According to the World Economic Forum's Global Gender Gap Report 2023, it will take 131 years for the gender gap to close.

== Methodology ==
The report's Gender Gap Index ranks countries regarding the gender inequality in four key areas: health, education, economy and politics.

- Economic participation and opportunity – outcomes on salaries, participation levels and access to high-skilled employment
- Educational attainment – outcomes on access to basic and higher-level education
- Political empowerment – outcomes on representation in decision-making structures
- Health and survival – outcomes on life expectancy and sex ratio. In this case parity is not assumed, there are assumed to be fewer female births than male (944 female for every 1,000 males), and men are assumed to die younger. Provided that women live at least six percent longer than men, parity is assumed. But if it is less than six percent it counts as a gender gap.

Thirteen out of the fourteen variables used to create the index are from publicly available "hard data" indicators from international organizations, such as the International Labour Organization, the United Nations Development Programme and the World Health Organization.

== 2025 Report ==
The 2025 report covered 148 economies. Papua New Guinea and Trinidad and Tobago returned to the index, and Gabon was included for the first time. Several countries that were ranked in previous editions, are not covered in the 2025 edition. These include Afghanistan (last ranked in 2023), Bahamas (2021), Cuba (2021), Iraq (2021), Malawi (2023), Mauritania (2021), Myanmar (2023), Qatar (2024), Russia (2021), Syria (2021), Venezuela (2021), and Yemen (2021).

Rank	Economy	Score 2025
1	Iceland	0.926
2	Finland	0.879
3	Norway	0.863
4	United Kingdom	0.838
5	New Zealand	0.827
6	Sweden	0.817
7	Moldova	0.813
8	Namibia	0.811
9	Germany	0.803
10	Ireland	0.801
11	Estonia	0.799
12	Spain	0.797
13	Australia	0.792
14	Denmark	0.791
15	Barbados	0.786
16	Costa Rica	0.786
17	Switzerland	0.785
18	Nicaragua	0.783
19	Lithuania	0.783
20	Philippines	0.781
21	Latvia	0.778
22	Chile	0.777
23	Mexico	0.776
24	Bangladesh	0.775
25	Ecuador	0.774
26	Serbia	0.774
27	Belgium	0.773
28	Trinidad and Tobago	0.772
29	Slovenia	0.770
30	Cape Verde	0.769
31	Guyana	0.768
32	Canada	0.767
33	South Africa	0.767
34	Portugal	0.767
35	France	0.765
36	Albania	0.763
37	Argentina	0.762
38	Jamaica	0.762
39	Rwanda	0.762
40	Liberia	0.760
41	Colombia	0.758
42	United States	0.756
43	Netherlands	0.756
44	Burundi	0.756
45	Poland	0.750
46	Eswatini	0.748
47	Singapore	0.748
48	Bolivia	0.747
49	Zimbabwe	0.747
50	Luxembourg	0.745
51	Panama	0.741
52	Suriname	0.738
53	Mozambique	0.738
54	Belarus	0.736
55	Tanzania	0.736
56	Austria	0.735
57	Peru	0.735
58	Madagascar	0.734
59	Armenia	0.731
60	Botswana	0.731
61	Dominican Republic	0.730
62	Ukraine	0.730
63	Georgia	0.729
64	Croatia	0.728
65	Mongolia	0.728
66	Thailand	0.728
67	Honduras	0.727
68	Malta	0.727
69	United Arab Emirates	0.724
70	Slovakia	0.723
71	Uruguay	0.720
72	Brazil	0.720
73	Bosnia and Herzegovina	0.717
74	Vietnam	0.713
75	Ethiopia	0.710
76	Israel	0.709
77	Greece	0.709
78	El Salvador	0.709
79	Zambia	0.707
80	Uganda	0.707
81	Guatemala	0.706
82	Cyprus	0.706
83	Bulgaria	0.706
84	Montenegro	0.705
85	Italy	0.704
86	Timor-Leste	0.704
87	Paraguay	0.703
88	Ghana	0.703
89	Belize	0.702
90	North Macedonia	0.699
91	Gabon	0.699
92	Kazakhstan	0.698
93	Cameroon	0.697
94	Romania	0.697
95	Kyrgyzstan	0.696
96	Laos	0.692
97	Indonesia	0.692
98	Kenya	0.689
99	Lesotho	0.688
100	Azerbaijan	0.688
101	South Korea	0.687
102	Czech Republic	0.686
103	China	0.686
104	Bahrain	0.684
105	Hungary	0.684
106	Cambodia	0.682
107	Brunei	0.681
108	Malaysia	0.681
109	Vanuatu	0.679
110	Uzbekistan	0.678
111	Mauritius	0.677
112	Sierra Leone	0.677
113	Benin	0.676
114	Gambia	0.674
115	Comoros	0.672
116	Senegal	0.670
117	Angola	0.668
118	Japan	0.666
119	Bhutan	0.663
120	Burkina Faso	0.659
121	Togo	0.657
122	Jordan	0.655
123	Tunisia	0.654
124	Nigeria	0.649
125	Nepal	0.648
126	Fiji	0.647
127	Côte d'Ivoire	0.647
128	Kuwait	0.646
129	Tajikistan	0.646
130	Sri Lanka	0.645
131	India	0.644
132	Saudi Arabia	0.643
133	Papua New Guinea	0.638
134	Oman	0.637
135	Turkey	0.633
136	Lebanon	0.632
137	Morocco	0.628
138	Maldives	0.626
139	Egypt	0.625
140	Mali	0.617
141	Algeria	0.614
142	Niger	0.613
143	Democratic Republic of the Congo	0.601
144	Guinea	0.595
145	Iran	0.583
146	Chad	0.571
147	Sudan	0.570
148	Pakistan	0.567

== Global Gender Gap Index 2006-2025 ==
The highest possible score is 1.0 (equality or better for women, except for lifespan (106% or better for women) and gender parity at birth (94.4% or better for women) and the lowest possible score is 0. Data for some countries are unavailable.

Location		Year																		
Country	Region	2025	2024	2023	2022	2021	2020	2018	2017	2016	2015	2014	2013	2012	2011	2010	2009	2008	2007	2006
Afghanistan	South Asia	N/A	N/A	0.405	0.435	0.444	N/A	N/A	N/A	N/A	N/A	N/A	N/A	N/A	N/A	N/A	N/A	N/A	N/A	N/A
Albania	Europe	0.763	0.780	0.791	0.787	0.770	0.769	0.734	0.728	0.704	0.701	0.6869	0.6412	0.6655	0.6748	0.6726	0.6601	0.6591	0.6685	0.6607
Algeria	Africa	0.614	0.612	0.573	0.602	0.633	0.634	0.629	0.629	0.642	0.632	0.6182	0.5966	0.6112	0.5991	0.6052	0.6119	0.6111	0.6068	0.6018
Angola	Africa	0.668	0.668	0.656	0.638	0.657	0.660	0.633	0.640	0.643	0.637	0.6311	0.6659	N/A	0.6624	0.6712	0.6353	0.6032	0.6034	0.6039
Argentina	South America	0.762	0.772	0.762	0.756	0.752	0.746	0.733	0.732	0.735	0.734	0.7317	0.7195	0.7212	0.7236	0.7187	0.7211	0.7209	0.6982	0.6829
Armenia	West Asia	0.731	0.721	0.721	0.698	0.673	0.684	0.678	0.677	0.669	0.668	0.6622	0.6634	0.6636	0.6654	0.6669	0.6619	0.6677	0.6651	N/A
Australia	Oceania	0.792	0.78	0.778	0.738	0.731	0.731	0.730	0.731	0.721	0.733	0.7409	0.7390	0.7294	0.7291	0.7271	0.7282	0.7241	0.7204	0.7163
Austria	Europe	0.735	0.743	0.740	0.781	0.777	0.744	0.718	0.709	0.716	0.733	0.7266	0.7437	0.7391	0.7165	0.7091	0.7031	0.7153	0.7060	0.6986
Azerbaijan	West Asia	0.688	0.685	0.692	0.687	0.688	0.687	0.680	0.676	0.684	0.675	0.6753	0.6582	0.6546	0.6577	0.6446	0.6626	0.6856	0.6781	N/A
Bahamas	Central America	N/A	N/A	N/A	N/A	0.725	0.720	0.741	0.743	0.729	0.728	0.7269	0.7128	0.7156	0.7340	0.7128	0.7179	N/A	N/A	N/A
Bahrain	West Asia	0.684	0.666	0.666	0.632	0.632	0.629	0.627	0.632	0.615	0.644	0.6261	0.6334	0.6298	0.6232	0.6217	0.6136	0.5927	0.5931	0.5894
Bangladesh	South Asia	0.775	0.689	0.722	0.714	0.719	0.726	0.721	0.719	0.698	0.704	0.6973	0.6848	0.6684	0.6812	0.6702	0.6526	0.6531	0.6314	0.6270
Barbados	Central America	0.786	0.773	0.769	0.765	0.769	0.749	0.753	0.750	0.739	0.744	0.7289	0.7301	0.7232	0.7170	0.7176	0.7236	0.7188	N/A	N/A
Belarus	Europe	0.736	0.733	0.752	0.750	0.758	0.746	0.747	0.744	0.737	0.734	N/A	N/A	N/A	N/A	N/A	N/A	N/A	N/A	N/A
Belgium	Europe	0.773	0.793	0.796	0.793	0.789	0.750	0.738	0.739	0.745	0.753	0.7809	0.7684	0.7652	0.7531	0.7509	0.7165	0.7163	0.7198	0.7078
Belize	Central America	0.702	0.696	0.696	0.695	0.699	0.671	0.662	0.692	0.676	0.668	0.6701	0.6449	0.6465	0.6489	0.6536	0.6636	0.6610	0.6426	N/A
Benin	Africa	0.676	0.629	0.616	0.612	0.653	0.658	0.654	0.652	0.636	0.625	N/A	0.5885	0.6258	0.5832	0.5719	0.5643	0.5582	0.5656	0.5780
Bhutan	South Asia	0.663	0.651	0.682	0.637	0.639	0.635	0.638	0.638	0.642	0.646	0.6364	0.6651	N/A	N/A	N/A	N/A	N/A	N/A	N/A
Bolivia	South America	0.747	0.746	0.730	0.734	0.722	0.734	0.748	0.758	0.746	0.749	0.7049	0.7340	0.7222	0.6862	0.6751	0.6693	0.6667	0.6574	0.6335
Bosnia and Herzegovina	Europe	0.717	0.710	0.698	0.710	0.713	N/A	N/A	N/A	N/A	N/A	N/A	N/A	N/A	N/A	N/A	N/A	N/A	N/A	N/A
Botswana	Africa	0.731	0.73	0.719	0.719	0.716	0.709	0.715	0.720	0.715	0.710	0.7129	0.6752	0.6744	0.6832	0.6876	0.7071	0.6839	0.6797	0.6897
Brazil	South America	0.720	0.716	0.726	0.696	0.695	0.691	0.681	0.684	0.687	0.686	0.6941	0.6949	0.6909	0.6679	0.6655	0.6695	0.6737	0.6637	0.6543
Brunei Darussalam	Southeast Asia	0.681	0.684	0.693	0.680	0.678	0.686	0.686	0.671	0.669	0.684	0.6719	0.6730	0.6750	0.6787	0.6748	0.6524	0.6392	N/A	N/A
Bulgaria	Europe	0.706	0.723	0.715	0.740	0.746	0.727	0.756	0.756	0.726	0.722	0.7444	0.7097	0.7021	0.6987	0.6983	0.7072	0.7077	0.7085	0.6870
Burkina Faso	Africa	0.659	0.661	0.676	0.659	0.651	0.635	0.629	0.646	0.64	0.651	0.6500	0.6513	0.6455	0.6153	0.6162	0.6081	0.6029	0.5912	0.5854
Burundi	Africa	0.756	0.757	0.763	0.777	0.769	0.745	0.741	0.755	0.768	0.748	0.7565	0.7397	0.7338	0.7270	N/A	N/A	N/A	N/A	N/A
Cambodia	Southeast Asia	0.682	0.685	0.695	0.690	0.685	0.694	0.683	0.676	0.658	0.662	0.6520	0.6509	0.6457	0.6464	0.6482	0.6410	0.6469	0.6353	0.6291
Cameroon	Africa	0.697	0.693	0.693	0.692	0.692	0.686	0.714	0.689	0.684	0.682	N/A	0.6560	0.6291	0.6073	0.6110	0.6108	0.6017	0.5919	0.5865
Canada	North America	0.767	0.761	0.77	0.772	0.772	0.772	0.771	0.769	0.731	0.740	0.7464	0.7425	0.7381	0.7407	0.7372	0.7196	0.7136	0.7198	0.7165
Cape Verde	Africa	0.769	0.755	0.761	0.736	0.716	0.725	0.702	0.686	0.729	0.717	0.7133	0.7122	0.7180	N/A	N/A	N/A	N/A	N/A	N/A
Chad	Africa	0.571	0.576	0.570	0.579	0.593	0.596	0.580	0.575	0.587	0.580	0.5764	0.5588	0.5594	0.5334	0.5330	0.5417	0.5290	0.5381	0.5247
Chile	South America	0.777	0.781	0.777	0.736	0.716	0.723	0.717	0.704	0.699	0.698	0.6975	0.6670	0.6676	0.7030	0.7013	0.6884	0.6818	0.6482	0.6455
China	East Asia	0.686	0.684	0.678	0.682	0.682	0.676	0.673	0.674	0.676	0.682	0.6830	0.6908	0.6853	0.6866	0.6881	0.6907	0.6878	0.6643	0.6561
Colombia	South America	0.758	0.745	0.751	0.710	0.725	0.758	0.729	0.731	0.727	0.725	0.7122	0.7171	0.6901	0.6714	0.6927	0.6939	0.6944	0.7090	0.7049
Comoros	Africa	0.672	0.663	0.664	0.631	N/A	N/A	N/A	N/A	N/A	N/A	N/A	N/A	N/A	N/A	N/A	N/A	N/A	N/A	N/A
Costa Rica	Central America	0.786	0.785	0.793	0.796	0.786	0.782	0.749	0.727	0.736	0.732	0.7165	0.7241	0.7225	0.7266	0.7194	0.7180	0.7111	0.7014	0.6936
Côte d'Ivoire	Africa	0.647	N/A	N/A	0.632	0.637	0.606	0.627	0.611	0.597	0.606	0.5874	0.5814	0.5785	0.5773	0.5691	N/A	N/A	N/A	N/A
Croatia	Europe	0.728	0.723	0.730	N/A	0.733	0.720	0.712	0.711	0.7	0.708	0.7075	0.7069	0.7053	0.7006	0.6939	0.6944	0.6967	0.7210	0.7145
Cuba	Central America	N/A	N/A	N/A	N/A	0.746	0.746	0.749	0.745	0.74	0.740	0.7317	0.7540	0.7417	0.7394	0.7253	0.7176	0.7195	0.7169	N/A
Cyprus	West Asia	0.706	0.705	0.678	0.696	0.707	0.692	0.684	0.684	0.684	0.671	0.6741	0.6801	0.6732	0.6567	0.6642	0.6706	0.6694	0.6522	0.6430
Czech Republic	Europe	0.686	0.684	0.685	0.710	0.711	0.706	0.693	0.688	0.69	0.687	0.6737	0.6770	0.6767	0.6789	0.6850	0.6789	0.6770	0.6718	0.6712
Democratic Republic of the Congo	Africa	0.601	0.609	0.612	0.575	0.576	N/A	N/A	N/A	N/A	N/A	N/A	N/A	N/A	N/A	N/A	N/A	N/A	N/A	N/A
Denmark	Europe	0.791	0.789	0.78	0.764	0.768	0.782	0.778	0.776	0.754	0.767	0.8025	0.7779	0.7777	0.7778	0.7719	0.7628	0.7538	0.7519	0.7462
Dominican Republic	Central America	0.730	0.706	0.704	0.703	0.699	0.700	0.701	0.697	0.676	0.686	0.6906	0.6867	0.6659	0.6682	0.6774	0.6859	0.6744	0.6705	0.6639
Ecuador	South America	0.774	0.788	0.737	0.743	0.739	0.729	0.729	0.724	0.726	0.738	0.7455	0.7389	0.7206	0.7035	0.7072	0.7220	0.7091	0.6881	0.6433
Egypt	Africa	0.625	0.629	0.626	0.635	0.639	0.629	0.614	0.608	0.614	0.599	0.6064	0.5935	0.5975	0.5933	0.5899	0.5862	0.5832	0.5809	0.5786
El Salvador	Central America	0.709	0.695	0.714	0.727	0.738	0.706	0.690	0.705	0.702	0.706	0.6863	0.6609	0.6630	0.6567	0.6596	0.6939	0.6875	0.6853	0.6837
Estonia	Europe	0.799	0.774	0.782	0.733	0.733	0.751	0.734	0.731	0.747	0.749	0.7017	0.6997	0.6977	0.6983	0.7018	0.7094	0.7076	0.7008	0.6944
Eswatini	Africa	0.748	0.744	0.745	0.728	0.729	N/A	N/A	0.670	0.665	0.670	N/A	N/A	N/A	N/A	N/A	N/A	N/A	N/A	N/A
Ethiopia	Africa	0.710	0.709	0.711	0.710	0.691	0.705	0.656	0.656	0.662	0.640	0.6144	0.6198	0.6200	0.6136	0.6019	0.5948	0.5867	0.5991	0.5946
Fiji	Oceania	0.647	0.642	0.65	0.676	0.674	0.678	0.669	N/A	N/A	0.645	0.6286	0.6286	0.6285	0.6255	0.6256	0.6414	N/A	N/A	N/A
Finland	Europe	0.879	0.875	0.863	0.860	0.861	0.832	0.821	0.823	0.845	0.850	0.8453	0.8421	0.8451	0.8383	0.8260	0.8252	0.8195	0.8044	0.7958
France	Europe	0.765	0.781	0.756	0.791	0.784	0.781	0.779	0.778	0.755	0.761	0.7588	0.7089	0.6984	0.7018	0.7025	0.7331	0.7341	0.6824	0.6520
Gambia, The	Africa	0.674	0.679	0.651	0.641	0.644	0.628	0.642	0.649	0.667	0.674	N/A	N/A	0.6630	0.6763	0.6762	0.6752	0.6622	0.6421	0.6448
Georgia	West Asia	0.729	0.716	0.708	0.731	0.732	0.708	0.677	0.679	0.681	0.687	0.6855	0.6750	0.6691	0.6624	0.6598	0.6680	0.6654	0.6665	0.6700
Germany	Europe	0.803	0.81	0.815	0.801	0.796	0.787	0.776	0.778	0.766	0.779	0.7780	0.7583	0.7629	0.7590	0.7530	0.7449	0.7394	0.7618	0.7524
Ghana	Africa	0.703	0.701	0.688	0.672	0.666	0.673	0.688	0.695	0.705	0.704	0.6661	0.6811	0.6778	0.6811	0.6782	0.6704	0.6679	0.6725	0.6653
Greece	Europe	0.709	0.714	0.693	0.689	0.689	0.701	0.696	0.692	0.68	0.685	0.6784	0.6782	0.6716	0.6916	0.6908	0.6662	0.6727	0.6648	0.6540
Guatemala	Central America	0.706	0.697	0.659	0.664	0.655	0.666	0.668	0.667	0.666	0.667	0.6821	0.6304	0.6260	0.6229	0.6238	0.6209	0.6072	0.6144	0.6067
Guinea	Africa	0.595	0.601	0.617	0.647	0.660	0.642	0.656	0.659	0.64	0.618	N/A	N/A	N/A	N/A	N/A	N/A	N/A	N/A	N/A
Guyana	South America	0.768	0.765	N/A	0.752	0.728	N/A	N/A	N/A	N/A	0.702	0.7010	0.7085	0.7119	0.7084	0.7090	0.7108	N/A	N/A	N/A
Honduras	Central America	0.727	0.726	0.735	0.705	0.716	0.722	0.706	0.711	0.69	0.688	0.6935	0.6773	0.6763	0.6945	0.6927	0.6893	0.6960	0.6661	0.6483
Hungary	Europe	0.684	0.686	0.689	0.699	0.688	0.677	0.674	0.670	0.669	0.672	0.6759	0.6742	0.6718	0.6642	0.6720	0.6879	0.6867	0.6731	0.6698
Iceland	Europe	0.926	0.935	0.912	0.908	0.892	0.877	0.858	0.878	0.874	0.881	0.8594	0.8731	0.8640	0.8530	0.8496	0.8276	0.7999	0.7836	0.7813
India	South Asia	0.644	0.641	0.643	0.629	0.625	0.668	0.665	0.669	0.683	0.664	0.6455	0.6551	0.6442	0.6190	0.6155	0.6151	0.6060	0.5936	0.6011
Indonesia	Southeast Asia	0.692	0.686	0.697	0.697	0.688	0.700	0.691	0.691	0.682	0.681	0.6725	0.6613	0.6591	0.6594	0.6615	0.6580	0.6473	0.6550	0.6541
Iran	West Asia	0.583	0.579	0.575	0.576	0.582	0.584	0.589	0.583	0.587	0.580	0.5811	0.5842	0.5927	0.5894	0.5933	0.5839	0.6021	0.5903	0.5803
Iraq	West Asia	N/A	N/A	N/A	N/A	0.535	N/A	N/A	N/A	N/A	N/A	N/A	N/A	N/A	N/A	N/A	N/A	N/A	N/A	N/A
Ireland	Europe	0.801	0.802	0.795	0.804	0.800	0.798	0.796	0.794	0.797	0.807	0.7850	0.7823	0.7839	0.7830	0.7773	0.7597	0.7518	0.7457	0.7335
Israel	West Asia	0.709	0.699	0.701	0.727	0.724	0.718	0.722	0.721	0.719	0.712	0.7005	0.7032	0.6989	0.6926	0.6957	0.7019	0.6900	0.6965	0.6889
Italy	Europe	0.704	0.703	0.705	0.720	0.721	0.707	0.706	0.692	0.719	0.726	0.6973	0.6885	0.6729	0.6796	0.6765	0.6798	0.6788	0.6498	0.6456
Jamaica	Central America	0.762	0.655	0.650	0.749	0.741	0.735	0.724	0.717	0.724	0.703	0.7128	0.7085	0.7035	0.7028	0.7037	0.7013	0.6980	0.6925	0.7014
Japan	East Asia	0.666	0.758	0.779	0.650	0.656	0.652	0.662	0.657	0.66	0.670	0.6584	0.6498	0.6530	0.6514	0.6524	0.6447	0.6434	0.6455	0.6447
Jordan	West Asia	0.655	0.663	0.647	0.639	0.683	0.623	0.605	0.604	0.603	0.593	0.5968	0.6093	0.6103	0.6117	0.6048	0.6182	0.6275	0.6203	0.6109
Kazakhstan	Central Asia	0.698	0.652	0.646	0.719	0.710	0.710	0.712	0.713	0.718	0.719	0.7210	0.7218	0.7213	0.7010	0.7055	0.7013	0.6976	0.6983	0.6928
Kenya	Africa	0.689	0.710	0.721	0.729	0.692	0.671	0.700	0.694	0.702	0.719	0.7258	0.6803	0.6768	0.6493	0.6499	0.6512	0.6547	0.6508	0.6486
Korea, Rep.	East Asia	0.687	0.712	0.708	0.689	0.687	0.672	0.657	0.650	0.649	0.651	0.6403	0.6351	0.6356	0.6281	0.6342	0.6146	0.6154	0.6409	0.6157
Kuwait	West Asia	0.646	0.636	0.651	0.632	0.621	0.650	0.630	0.679	0.624	0.646	0.6457	0.6292	0.6320	0.6322	0.6318	0.6356	0.6358	0.6409	0.6341
Kyrgyz Republic	Central Asia	0.696	0.700	0.700	0.700	0.681	0.689	0.691	0.691	0.687	0.693	0.6974	0.6948	0.7013	0.7036	0.6973	0.7058	0.7045	0.6653	0.6742
Laos	Southeast Asia	0.692	0.700	0.733	0.733	0.750	0.731	0.748	0.703	N/A	0.713	0.7044	0.6993	N/A	N/A	N/A	N/A	N/A	N/A	N/A
Latvia	Europe	0.778	0.773	0.794	0.771	0.778	0.785	0.758	0.756	0.755	0.752	0.7691	0.7610	0.7572	0.7399	0.7429	0.7416	0.7397	0.7333	0.7091
Lebanon	West Asia	0.632	0.632	0.628	0.644	0.638	0.599	0.595	0.596	0.598	0.598	0.5923	0.6028	0.6030	0.6083	0.6084	N/A	N/A	N/A	N/A
Lesotho	Africa	0.688	0.691	0.702	0.700	0.698	0.695	0.693	0.695	0.706	0.706	0.7255	0.7530	0.7608	0.7666	0.7678	0.7495	0.7320	0.7078	0.6807
Liberia	Africa	0.760	0.754	0.76	0.709	0.693	0.685	0.681	0.669	0.652	0.652	N/A	N/A	N/A	N/A	N/A	N/A	N/A	N/A	N/A
Lithuania	Europe	0.783	0.793	0.800	0.799	0.804	0.745	0.749	0.742	0.744	0.740	0.7208	0.7308	0.7191	0.7131	0.7132	0.7175	0.7222	0.7234	0.7077
Luxembourg	Europe	0.745	0.744	0.747	0.736	0.726	0.725	0.712	0.706	0.734	0.738	0.7333	0.7410	0.7439	0.7216	0.7231	0.6889	0.6802	0.6786	0.6671
North Macedonia	Europe	0.699	0.727	0.711	0.716	0.715	0.711	0.707	0.702	0.696	0.701	0.6943	0.7013	0.6968	0.6966	0.6996	0.6950	0.6914	0.6967	0.6983
Madagascar	Africa	0.734	0.720	0.737	0.735	0.725	0.719	0.691	0.692	0.704	0.698	0.7214	0.7016	0.6982	0.6797	0.6713	0.6732	0.6736	0.6461	0.6385
Malawi	Africa	N/A	N/A	0.676	0.632	0.671	0.664	0.662	0.672	0.7	0.701	0.7281	0.7139	0.7166	0.6850	0.6824	0.6738	0.6664	0.6480	0.6437
Malaysia	Southeast Asia	0.681	0.668	0.682	0.681	0.676	0.677	0.676	0.670	0.666	0.655	0.6520	0.6518	0.6539	0.6525	0.6479	0.6467	0.6442	0.6444	0.6509
Maldives	South Asia	0.626	0.633	0.649	0.648	0.642	0.646	0.662	0.669	.65	0.652	0.6557	0.6604	0.6616	0.6480	0.6452	0.6482	0.6501	0.6350	N/A
Mali	Africa	0.617	0.604	0.605	0.601	0.591	0.621	0.582	0.583	0.591	0.599	0.5779	0.5872	0.5842	0.5752	0.5680	0.5860	0.6117	0.6019	0.5996
Malta	Europe	0.727	0.723	0.713	0.703	0.703	0.693	0.686	0.682	0.664	0.668	0.6707	0.6761	0.6666	0.6658	0.6695	0.6635	0.6634	0.6615	0.6518
Mauritania	Africa	N/A	N/A	N/A	N/A	0.606	0.614	0.607	0.614	0.624	0.613	0.6029	0.5810	0.6129	0.6164	0.6152	0.6103	0.6117	0.6022	0.5835
Mauritius	Africa	0.677	0.683	0.689	0.679	0.679	0.665	0.663	0.664	0.652	0.646	0.6541	0.6599	0.6547	0.6529	0.6520	0.6513	0.6466	0.6487	0.6328
Mexico	North America	0.776	0.768	0.765	0.764	0.757	0.754	0.721	0.692	0.7	0.699	0.6900	0.6917	0.6712	0.6604	0.6577	0.6503	0.6441	0.6441	0.6462
Moldova	Europe	0.813	0.791	0.788	0.788	0.768	0.757	0.733	0.740	0.741	0.742	0.7405	0.7037	0.7101	0.7083	0.7160	0.7104	0.7244	0.7172	0.7128
Mongolia	East Asia	0.728	0.705	0.704	0.715	0.716	0.706	0.714	0.713	0.705	0.709	0.7212	0.7204	0.7111	0.7140	0.7194	0.7221	0.7049	0.6731	0.6821
Montenegro	Europe	0.705	0.718	0.714	0.732	0.732	0.710	0.706	0.693	0.681	0.689	N/A	N/A	N/A	N/A	N/A	N/A	N/A	N/A	N/A
Morocco	Africa	0.628	0.628	0.621	0.624	0.612	0.605	0.607	0.598	0.597	0.593	0.5988	0.5845	0.5833	0.5804	0.5767	0.5926	0.5757	0.5676	0.5827
Mozambique	Africa	0.738	0.776	0.778	0.752	0.758	0.723	0.721	0.741	0.75	0.741	0.7370	0.7349	0.7350	0.7251	0.7329	0.7195	0.7266	0.6883	N/A
Myanmar	Southeast Asia	N/A	N/A	0.650	0.677	0.681	0.665	0.690	0.691	N/A	N/A	N/A	N/A	N/A	N/A	N/A	N/A	N/A	N/A	N/A
Namibia	Africa	0.811	0.805	0.802	0.807	0.809	0.784	0.789	0.777	0.765	0.760	0.7219	0.7094	0.7121	0.7177	0.7238	0.7167	0.7141	0.7012	0.6864
Nepal	South Asia	0.648	0.664	0.659	0.692	0.683	0.680	0.671	0.664	0.661	0.658	0.6458	0.6053	0.6026	0.5888	0.6084	0.6213	0.5942	0.5575	0.5478
Netherlands	Europe	0.756	0.775	0.777	0.767	0.762	0.736	0.747	0.737	0.756	0.776	0.7730	0.7608	0.7659	0.7470	0.7444	0.7490	0.7399	0.7383	0.7250
New Zealand	Oceania	0.827	0.835	0.856	0.841	0.840	0.799	0.801	0.791	0.781	0.782	0.7772	0.7799	0.7805	0.7810	0.7808	0.7880	0.7859	0.7649	0.7509
Nicaragua	Central America	0.783	0.811	0.811	0.810	0.796	0.804	0.809	0.814	0.78	0.776	0.7894	0.7715	0.7697	0.7245	0.7176	0.7002	0.6747	0.6458	0.6566
Niger	Africa	0.613	0.628	0.622	0.635	0.629	N/A	N/A	N/A	N/A	N/A	N/A	N/A	N/A	N/A	N/A	N/A	N/A	N/A	N/A
Nigeria	Africa	0.649	0.65	0.637	0.639	0.627	0.635	0.621	0.641	0.643	0.638	0.6391	0.6469	0.6315	0.6011	0.6055	0.6280	0.6339	0.6122	0.6104
Norway	Europe	0.863	0.875	0.879	0.845	0.849	0.842	0.835	0.830	0.842	0.850	0.8374	0.8417	0.8403	0.8404	0.8404	0.8227	0.8239	0.8059	0.7994
Oman	West Asia	0.637	0.628	0.614	0.609	0.608	0.602	0.605	N/A	0.612	0.604	0.6091	0.6053	0.5986	0.5873	0.5950	0.5938	0.5960	0.5903	N/A
Pakistan	South Asia	0.567	0.570	0.575	0.564	0.556	0.564	0.550	0.546	0.556	0.559	0.5522	0.5459	0.5478	0.5583	0.5465	0.5458	0.5549	0.5509	0.5434
Panama	Central America	0.741	0.742	0.724	0.743	0.737	0.730	0.722	0.722	0.721	0.772	0.7195	0.7164	0.7122	0.7042	0.7072	0.7024	0.7095	0.6954	0.6935
Papua New Guinea	Oceania	0.638	N/A	N/A	N/A	0.635	N/A	N/A	N/A	N/A	N/A	N/A	N/A	N/A	N/A	N/A	N/A	N/A	N/A	N/A
Paraguay	South America	0.703	0.707	0.695	0.707	0.702	0.683	0.672	0.678	0.676	0.666	0.6890	0.6724	0.6714	0.6818	0.6804	0.6868	0.6379	0.6659	0.6556
Peru	South America	0.735	0.755	0.764	0.749	0.721	0.714	0.720	0.719	0.687	0.683	0.7198	0.6787	0.6742	0.6796	0.6895	0.7024	0.6959	0.6624	0.6619
Philippines	Southeast Asia	0.781	0.779	0.791	0.783	0.784	0.781	0.799	0.790	0.786	0.790	0.7814	0.7832	0.7757	0.7685	0.7654	0.7579	0.7568	0.7629	0.7516
Poland	Europe	0.750	0.740	0.722	0.709	0.713	0.736	0.728	0.728	0.727	0.715	0.7051	0.7031	0.7015	0.7038	0.7037	0.6998	0.6951	0.6756	0.6802
Portugal	Europe	0.767	0.787	0.765	0.766	0.775	0.744	0.732	0.734	0.737	0.731	0.7243	0.7056	0.7071	0.7144	0.7171	0.7013	0.7051	0.6959	0.6922
Qatar	West Asia	N/A	0.640	0.627	0.617	0.624	0.629	0.629	0.626	0.643	0.645	0.6403	0.6299	0.6264	0.6230	0.6059	0.5907	0.5948	0.6041	N/A
Romania	Europe	0.697	0.717	0.697	0.698	0.700	0.724	0.711	0.708	0.69	0.693	0.6936	0.6908	0.6859	0.6812	0.6826	0.6805	0.6763	0.6859	0.6797
Russia	Europe	N/A	N/A	N/A	N/A	0.708	0.706	0.701	0.696	0.691	0.694	0.6927	0.6983	0.6980	0.7037	0.7036	0.6987	0.6994	0.6866	0.6770
Rwanda	Africa	0.762	0.757	0.794	0.811	0.805	0.791	0.804	0.822	0.8	0.794	N/A	N/A	N/A	N/A	N/A	N/A	N/A	N/A	N/A
Saudi Arabia	West Asia	0.643	0.647	0.637	0.636	0.603	0.599	0.590	0.584	0.583	0.605	0.6059	0.5879	0.5731	0.5753	0.5713	0.5651	0.5537	0.5647	0.5242
Senegal	Africa	0.670	0.679	0.680	0.668	0.684	0.684	0.682	0.684	0.685	0.698	0.6912	0.6923	0.6657	0.6573	0.6414	0.6427	N/A	N/A	N/A
Serbia	Europe	0.774	0.779	0.76	0.779	0.780	0.736	0.730	0.727	0.72	0.720	0.7086	0.7116	0.7037	N/A	N/A	N/A	N/A	N/A	N/A
Sierra Leone	Africa	0.677	0.708	0.667	0.672	0.655	N/A	N/A	N/A	N/A	N/A	N/A	N/A	N/A	N/A	N/A	N/A	N/A	N/A	N/A
Singapore	Southeast Asia	0.748	0.744	0.739	0.734	0.727	0.724	0.707	0.702	0.712	0.711	0.7046	0.7000	0.6989	0.6914	0.6914	0.6664	0.6625	0.6609	0.6550
Slovakia	Europe	0.723	0.731	0.72	0.717	0.712	0.718	0.693	0.694	0.679	0.675	0.6806	0.6857	0.6824	0.6797	0.6778	0.6845	0.6824	0.6797	0.6757
Slovenia	Europe	0.770	0.766	0.773	0.744	0.741	0.743	0.784	0.805	0.786	0.784	0.7443	0.7155	0.7132	0.7041	0.7047	0.6982	0.6937	0.6842	0.6745
South Africa	Africa	0.767	0.785	0.787	0.782	0.781	0.780	0.755	0.756	0.764	0.759	0.7527	0.7510	0.7496	0.7478	0.7535	0.7709	0.7232	0.7194	0.7125
Spain	Europe	0.797	0.797	0.791	0.788	0.788	0.795	0.746	0.746	0.738	0.742	0.7325	0.7266	0.7266	0.7580	0.7554	0.7345	0.7281	0.7444	0.7319
Sri Lanka	South Asia	0.645	0.653	0.663	0.670	0.670	0.680	0.676	0.669	0.673	0.686	0.6903	0.7019	0.7122	0.7212	0.7458	0.7402	0.7371	0.7230	0.7199
Suriname	South America	0.738	0.739	0.736	0.737	0.729	0.707	0.695	0.689	0.679	0.670	0.6504	0.6369	0.6409	0.6395	0.6407	0.6726	0.6674	0.6794	N/A
Sweden	Europe	0.817	0.816	0.815	0.822	0.823	0.820	0.822	0.816	0.815	0.823	0.8165	0.8129	0.8159	0.8044	0.8024	0.8139	0.8139	0.8146	0.8133
Switzerland	Europe	0.785	0.785	0.783	0.795	0.798	0.779	0.755	0.755	0.776	0.785	0.7798	0.7736	0.7672	0.7627	0.7562	0.7426	0.7360	0.6924	0.6997
Syria	West Asia	N/A	N/A	N/A	N/A	0.568	0.567	0.568	0.568	0.567	0.568	0.5775	0.5661	0.5626	0.5896	0.5926	0.6072	0.6181	0.6216	N/A
Tajikistan	Central Asia	0.646	0.673	0.672	0.663	0.650	0.626	0.638	0.678	0.679	0.675	0.6654	0.6682	0.6608	0.6526	0.6598	0.6661	0.6541	0.6578	N/A
Tanzania	Africa	0.736	0.734	0.740	0.719	0.707	0.713	0.704	0.700	0.716	0.718	0.7182	0.6928	0.7091	0.6904	0.6829	0.6797	0.7068	0.6969	0.7038
Thailand	Southeast Asia	0.728	0.72	0.711	0.709	0.710	0.708	0.702	0.694	0.699	0.706	0.7027	0.6928	0.6893	0.6892	0.6910	0.6907	0.6917	0.6815	0.6831
Timor-Leste	Southeast Asia	0.704	0.704	0.693	0.730	0.720	0.662	0.638	0.628	0.637	N/A	N/A	N/A	0.6855	N/A	N/A	N/A	N/A	N/A	N/A
Togo	Africa	0.657	0.71	0.696	0.697	0.683	N/A	N/A	N/A	N/A	N/A	N/A	N/A	N/A	N/A	N/A	N/A	N/A	N/A	N/A
Trinidad and Tobago	Central America	0.772	N/A	N/A	N/A	0.749	0.756	N/A	N/A	0.723	0.720	0.7154	0.7166	0.7116	0.7372	0.7353	0.7298	0.7245	0.6859	0.6797
Tunisia	Africa	0.654	0.668	0.642	0.643	0.649	0.644	0.648	0.651	0.636	0.634	0.6272	N/A	N/A	0.6255	0.6266	0.6233	0.6295	0.6283	0.6288
Turkey	West Asia	0.633	0.645	0.638	0.639	0.638	0.635	0.628	0.625	0.623	0.624	0.6183	0.6081	0.6015	0.5954	0.5876	0.5828	0.5853	0.5768	0.5850
Uganda	Africa	0.707	0.706	0.706	0.724	0.717	0.717	0.724	0.721	0.704	0.708	0.6821	0.7086	0.7228	0.7220	0.7169	0.7067	0.6981	0.6833	0.6797
Ukraine	Europe	0.730	0.722	0.714	0.707	0.714	0.721	0.708	0.705	0.7	0.702	0.7056	0.6935	0.6894	0.6861	0.6869	0.6896	0.6856	0.6790	0.6797
United Arab Emirates	West Asia	0.724	0.713	0.712	0.716	0.716	0.655	0.642	0.649	0.639	0.646	0.6436	0.6372	0.6392	0.6454	0.6397	0.6198	0.6220	0.6184	0.5919
United Kingdom	Europe	0.838	0.789	0.792	0.780	0.775	0.767	0.744	0.770	0.752	0.758	0.7383	0.7440	0.7433	0.7462	0.7460	0.7402	0.7366	0.7441	0.7365
United States	North America	0.756	0.747	0.748	0.769	0.763	0.724	0.720	0.718	0.722	0.740	0.7463	0.7392	0.7373	0.7412	0.7411	0.7173	0.7179	0.7002	0.7042
Uruguay	South America	0.720	0.715	0.714	0.711	0.702	0.737	0.715	0.710	0.681	0.679	0.6871	0.6803	0.6745	0.6907	0.6897	0.6936	0.6907	0.6608	0.6549
Vanuatu	Oceania	0.679	0.673	0.678	0.670	0.625	N/A	N/A	N/A	N/A	N/A	N/A	N/A	N/A	N/A	N/A	N/A	N/A	N/A	N/A
Venezuela	South America	N/A	N/A	N/A	N/A	0.699	0.713	0.709	0.706	0.694	0.691	0.6851	0.7060	0.7060	0.6861	0.6863	0.6839	0.6875	0.6797	0.6664
Vietnam	Southeast Asia	0.713	0.715	0.711	0.705	0.701	0.700	0.698	0.698	0.7	0.687	0.6915	0.6863	0.6867	0.6732	0.6776	0.6802	0.6778	0.6889	N/A
Yemen	West Asia	N/A	N/A	N/A	N/A	0.492	0.494	0.499	0.516	0.516	0.484	0.5145	0.5128	0.5054	0.4873	0.4603	0.4609	0.4664	0.4510	0.4595
Zambia	Africa	0.707	0.697	0.699	0.723	0.726	0.731	N/A	N/A	N/A	0.650	0.6364	0.6312	0.6279	0.6300	0.6293	0.6310	0.6205	0.6288	0.6360
Zimbabwe	Africa	0.747	0.740	0.746	0.734	0.732	0.730	0.721	0.717	0.71	0.709	0.7013	N/A	N/A	0.6607	0.6574	0.6518	0.6485	0.6464	0.6461

== Upper limiting value of the Gender Gap Index ==
1. Economic participation and opportunity
Ratio	Limit	Weight	Value
Labour force participation	1.0	0.199	0.199
Wage equality for similar work	1.0	0.310	0.310
Estimated earned income	1.0	0.221	0.221
Legislators, senior officials and managers	1.0	0.149	0.149
Professional and technical workers	1.0	0.121	0.121
	Sum	1.0	1.0
2. Educational attainment
Ratio	Limit	Weight	Value
Literacy rate	1.0	0.191	0.191
Enrolment in primary education	1.0	0.459	0.459
Enrolment in secondary education	1.0	0.229	0.229
Enrolment in tertiary education	1.0	0.121	0.121
	Sum	1.0	1.0
3. Health and survival
Ratio	Limit	Weight	Value
Sex ratio at birth	0.944	0.693	0.654
Healthy life expectancy	1.060	0.307	0.325
	Sum	1.0	0.980
4. Political empowerment
Ratio	Limit	Weight	Value
Women in parliament	1.0	0.310	0.310
Women in ministerial positions	1.0	0.247	0.247
Years with female head of state	1.0	0.443	0.443
	Sum	1.0	1.0

Compilation
1. Economic participation and opportunity	1.000
2. Educational attainment	1.000
3. Health and survival	0.980
4. Political empowerment	1.000
Sum	3.980

Gender Gap Index: 3.98 / 4 = 0.9949

This is the upper limiting value of the Gender Gap Index for the female-to-male ratio and for the male-to-female ratio.

== Criticisms and challenges ==
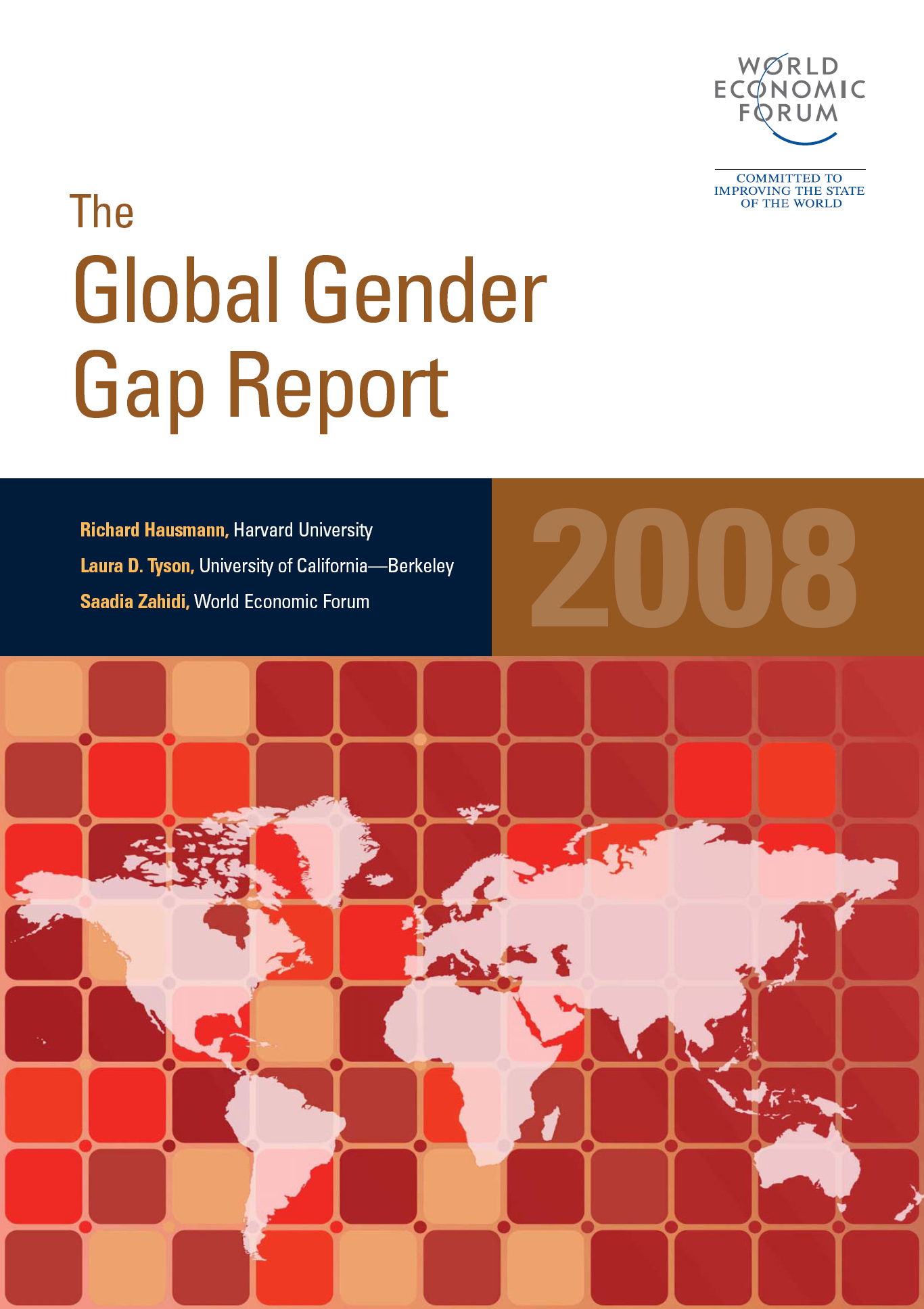
Cover of the 2008 report

The index is designed to "measure gender-based gaps in access to resources and opportunities in countries rather than the actual level of the available resources and opportunities in those countries."

In an academic publication from 2010, Beneria and Permanyer criticized the Global Gender Gap Index for only capturing inequality in certain aspects of women's lives therefore making it an incomplete measure of gender inequality.

In an academic publication from 2019, Stoet and Geary discussed several limitations of the index. For example, in the current ranking methodology, no country can, by definition, be more favorable for women than for men. This causes the index to undervalue issues that disproportionately affect men. According to the Global Gender Gap Report 2021, the index does not penalize a country where women outperform men in certain aspects, and it considers that parity is achieved in life expectancy only if women live five years longer than men.

== See also ==
- Gender Empowerment Measure
- Gender Inequality Index
- Gender-Related Development Index
- Social Institutions and Gender Index
- Female labour force in the Muslim world
- Gender pay gap
- Women's rights in 2014
- Women Peace and Security Index
