= Typology (social science research method) =

Typology is a composite measure that involves the classification of observations in terms of their attributes on multiple variables. Such classification is usually done on a nominal scale. Typologies are used in both qualitative and quantitative research.

An example of a typology would be classification such as by age and health: young-healthy, young-sick, old-healthy, old-sick.

Typological theorizing is the development of theories about configurations of variables that constitute theoretical types. According to Andrew Bennett and Alexander George, typological theories are useful "to address complex phenomena without oversimplifying, clarify similarities and differences among cases to facilitate comparisons, provide a comprehensive inventory of all possible kinds of cases, incorporate interactions effects, and draw attention to... kinds of cases that have not occurred."
