= Instituto del Tercer Mundo =

Instituto del Tercer Mundo (ITeM, or the Third World Institute) is a Non-Governmental Organization that performs information, communication and education activities. ITeM, which was established in 1989, shares the same secretariat and coordinating personnel as Social Watch and is based in Montevideo, Uruguay.

== Goals and Activities ==
The organization describes itself as a civil society organization that encourages citizen involvement in global decision-making processes. Among its principle aims are to:

- contribute to the construction and enhancement of democracy
- promote a respect for human rights,
- promote national and international networking among citizens' organizations, and
- contribute to the study and solutions of problems affecting the Third World

The organization places civil society organizations as key agents in the process of social transformation and focuses on information, communication, and education activities on an international level. It has produced original research and critical policy analysis, and has built electronic communication networks through Chasque.

The organization has been known for the publication of The World Guide (formerly called the Third World Guide), which acted as a reference book focusing on diverse global issues and concerns, as seen from the perspective of the Global South.
