= Paul-Marie Boulanger =

Belgian sociologist

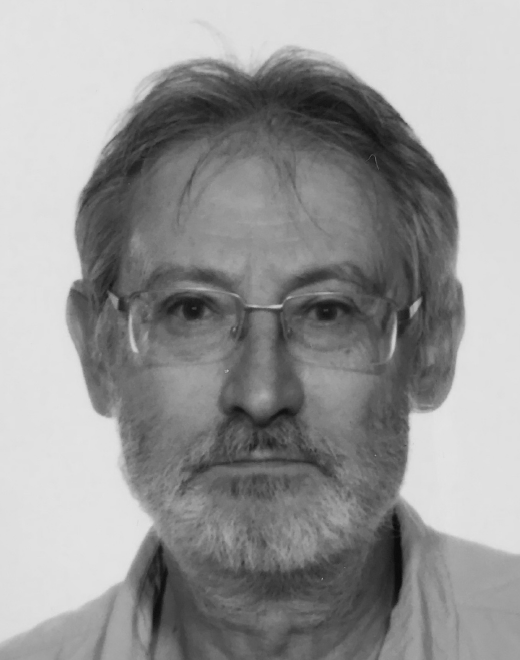
- Born: March 19, 1950 (age 75)
- Education: University of Strasbourg, Leuven

Paul-Marie Boulanger is a Belgian sociologist active in the study of sustainable development and consumption.

== Works ==
Paul-Marie Boulanger received his degrees in sociology from the University of Strasbourg and that of Leuven. His work at the Demography Department of the Catholic University of Leuven focused on demographic, social security and labour market, while when working at the European Agency for Development and Health he was concerned – also as responsible of the Agency’s information system – with food security and famine prevention in Africa. Paul-Marie Boulanger is one of the founders of the Institute for Sustainable Development (Belgium) where he worked since 1996 on sustainable development and transitions. Between 1999 and 2016 he was president of the Institute. Several of his papers are in the theory of sustainable development and consumption. His work on models for sustainable development has been used by several authors. Boulanger also worked on social indicators of human well-being, models and methods for decision support, and climate change. As discussed in, Boulanger gave a contribution to the theory of composite indicators, including an analysis of the scarce traction of indicators of development meant to unseat GDP as a measures of progress.

He also studies the application of the theories on Niklas Luhmann, such as to science’s reproducibility crisis and to interpreting the present pandemic.
