= Sylvia Gyde =

British medical doctor

- Born: Sylvia Nancy Clayton; 27 March 1936; Llanidloes, Wales
- Died: 23 April 2024 (aged 88)
- Education: Somerville College, Oxford
- Occupations: Public health doctor; Medical researcher; Medical administrator
- Years active: 1960s–1990s
- Medical career
- Profession: Doctor
- Institutions: Birmingham General Hospital; North Birmingham Health Authority

Sylvia Nancy Gyde (née Clayton; 27 March 1936 – 23 April 2024) was a British public health doctor, medical researcher and National Health Service administrator. She founded a family planning clinic for women on a deprived council estate in Woolwich, southeast London and worked in general practice in Hall Green, Birmingham. Gyde was medical director of the West Midlands Regional Perinatal Survey, district medical officer and director of public health at North Birmingham Health Authority, medical director of clinical audit for the West Midlands and medical director of the Evidence Supported Medicine Union.

== Biography ==
Gyde was born in Llanidloes, mid-Wales on 27 March 1936. She was the daughter of the tannery manager Robert Clayton and his wife Violet (née Marshall), who was a chartered secretary. Gyde had two younger brothers. When she was one year old, the family moved to the rural Suffolk village of Combs. Gyde attended the Saint Felix School in Southwold as a scholarship border, having attained a perfect score on her eleven-plus examination, raising suspicions of cheating until a supervised resit vindicated her. She attended Somerville College, Oxford to study a Bachelor of Medicine, Bachelor of Surgery degree on a Nuffield scholarship from 1954 to 1957. Gyde was tutored by the physiologist Jean Banister and the Nobel prize winning chemist Dorothy Hodgkin and sung in choirs.

She took her clinical training at the London Hospital Medical College and was asked to establish a family planning clinic for women on a deprived council estate in Woolwich, southeast London, providing contraceptives at the town community hall. Following her move to Birmingham in 1972, Gyde began working in general practice in Hall Green for four years before being offered the chance by a gastroenterology consultant to join Birmingham General Hospital as a researcher of the inflammatory bowel disease Crohn's disease and ulcerative colitis for seven years. Her work resulted in the publication of a series of papers on inflammatory bowel disease. In 1983, she joined the public health medicine training scheme as its oldest student. In January 1986, she was appointed by the West Midlands Regional Health Authority to be medical director of the West Midlands Regional Perinatal Survey for three years because the West Midlands had the worst perinatal rate of stillbirths and deaths within the first week of life in England and Wales. Gyde examined the deaths of 250 babies and interviewed doctors, midwives and mothers.

The findings led to her being appointed district medical officer and director of public health at North Birmingham Health Authority in 1988 and remained in the post until 1994. Gyde took up the role in January 1989 and was based at Good Hope Hospital in Sutton Coldfield. She oversaw preventative health measures, the promotion of health and advised health authority managers on how their decisions will make a clinical impact. She presented a report to the North Birmingham Health Authority in 1991 that there were no cases of HIV/AIDS in the area but 10 in the region, arguing for funding into preventative medicine and the retention of experts. The following year, Gyde revisited perinatal mortality in her annual report, drawing attention to the fact that the rate of stillbirths and deaths of newborn babies were still above the national and regional averages. She went on to be the medical director of clinical audit for the West Midlands from 1994 to 1996 and was then medical director of the Evidence Supported Medicine Union between 1996 and 1997 as she sought ways to better the care of patients. She was a member of the British Medical Association.

Gyde retired from public health in the late 1990s, moving to the East of England. She conducted locum duties in London, performed as a singer in various choirs, and completed a City and Guilds qualification in ceramics. Gyde also played the piano and was a member of the Bach Society. In December 2001, she became non-executive director of the Essex Rivers Healthcare National Health Service Trust, focusing on putting in place clinical governance.

== Personal life ==
She was married to the haematology consultant Oscar Humphrey Gyde in 1961. They had four children. Gyde died of colon cancer and dementia on 23 April 2024. A commemoration service for her and other alumni took place at the college chapel of Somerville College, Oxford on 8 June 2024.
