= Gide River =

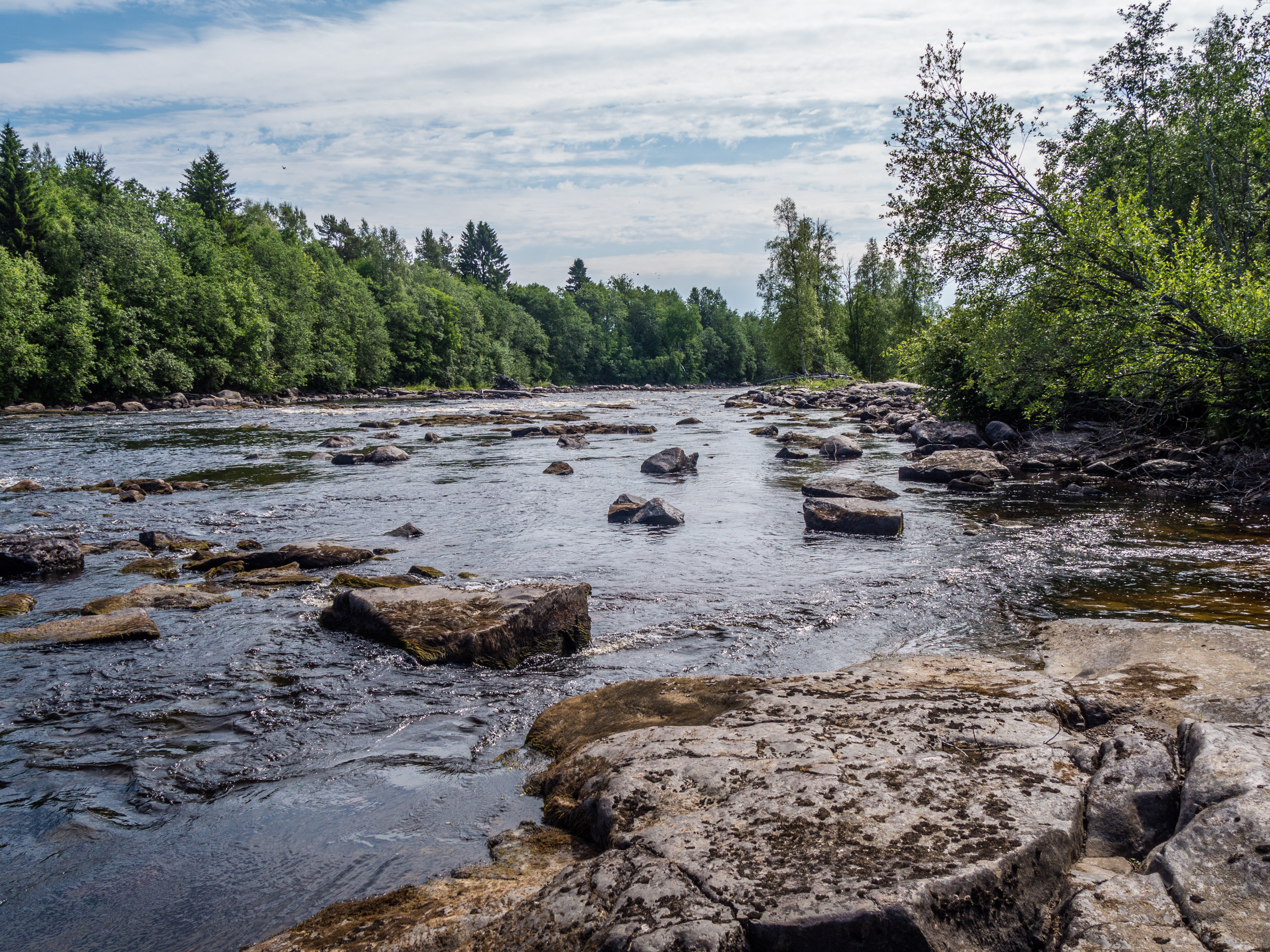
- Native name: Gideälven (Swedish)

Location
- Country: Sweden

Physical characteristics
- Mouth: Bothnian Sea
  - location: Husum, Örnsköldsvik Municipality
  - coordinates: 63°19′45″N 19°08′15″E
  - elevation: 0 m (0 ft)
- Length: 225 km (140 mi)
- Basin size: 3,441.8 km^{2} (1,328.9 sq mi)
- Discharge
  - average: 38 m^{3}/s (1,300 cu ft/s)

Gide River (Swedish: Gideälven) is a river in Sweden.
