= GYD =

GYD may refer to:

- Guyanese dollar, the currency of Guyana
- Heydar Aliyev International Airport, in Baku, Azerbaijan
- Kayardild language, spoken in Australia
- Global Youth Day, a spiritual/religious event
- Grab your Deal (also: GrabyourDeal, sometimes found with suffix "24" or purely Grab24), a trading brand for toys, child products, sports equipment, home decoration objects and garden accessories
- Get Yourself Dressed, a company that provides colorful party costumes via internet to end customers

== See also ==
- GID (disambiguation)
