= National Human Development Report =

UN national reports on the status of human development

The 2006 NHDR for Laos

The National Human Development Reports (NHDR) are national reports produced by countries on the status of human development. The reports adopt a similar approach as the United Nations Development Programme (UNDP)'s Global Human Development Report but at a national level. The reports are produced by national teams. More than 540 national and sub-national HDRs have been produced so far by 135 countries, in addition to 31 regional reports.

== Purpose ==
National reports have been used to introduce the concept of human development into national policy dialogue.

More than any other product of the United Nations, the Human Development Report series has shaped the global development debate. It championed the now-unremarkable idea that better lives for people should be the aim of the international community's efforts. Starting in 1992, developing countries began to adopt this approach, using national human development reports to explore how people were faring in their own countries and to confront sensitive issues-including corruption

Data that is published in the reports is often not published elsewhere, such as statistics by geographic location or ethnic group. The data helps to pinpoint development gaps, measure progress, and can even flag early signs of possible conflict. Designed to appeal to a wide audience, the reports also often spur lively public debates and mobilize support for change.

The UNDP has a unit, the National Human Development Report Unit, that helps to review and provide advice to countries on their own national reports.

== Country-specific reports ==
=== Brazil ===
Brazil's national report is often used by national, state, and local government to determine resource allocation.

=== China ===
The first national report for China was produced in 1999.

=== Laos ===
The first national report for Lao PDR entitled “National Human Development Report 1998”, explained the concept and importance of human development. Its most significant contribution was to capture the state of human development as at 1996, thus providing a baseline for future measurements. The report was launched in March 1999, during a seminar that was attended by a high level delegation of government, international organizations and independent experts.

The second NHDR (2002), "Advancing Rural Development", took an in-depth look at the different aspects of rural society where 80% of the population lives. The third NHDR on "International Trade and Human Development"(2006) was released by the National Statistics Centre, with the financial support of the UNDP, at a roundtable meeting held on 28-29 November 2006.

=== Mexico ===
In the past, the national development report has looked at indigenous issues and poverty.

=== Uganda ===
In the past, the national development report has focussed on factors that contributed to the country's AIDs crisis.

=== United States ===
The US is one of the only developed countries for which a national development report has been produced. The first US National Human Development Report was produced in 2008 appended with additional content in 2009.
