= OECD Development Centre =

Knowledge sharing forum for OECD members

- Coat of arms
- Secretariat: Paris, France
- Membership: 56 countries

Leaders
  - Director: Ragnheiður Elín Árnadóttir
- Establishment: 1961
- Website www.oecd.org/dev/

The OECD Development Centre was established in 1961 as an independent platform for knowledge sharing and policy dialogue between Organisation for Economic Co-operation and Development (OECD) member countries and developing economies, allowing these countries to interact on an equal footing.

Today, 25 OECD member countries and 29 non-OECD member countries are members of the Centre.

== Membership ==
The Development Centre of the Organisation for Economic Co-operation and Development was established in 1961 and ‌comprises 56 countries, of which 25 are OECD members: Belgium, Chile, Colombia, the Czech Republic, Costa Rica, Denmark, Finland, France, Greece, Iceland, Ireland, Israel, Italy, Japan, Korea, Mexico, the Netherlands, Norway, Portugal, Slovak Republic, Slovenia, Spain, Sweden, Switzerland and Turkey. In addition, 29 non-OECD countries are full members of the Development Centre: Albania (since June 2023), Brazil (since March 1994); Guinea (since October 2026); India (February 2001); Romania (October 2004); Thailand (March 2005); South Africa (May 2006); Egypt and Viet Nam (March 2008); Indonesia (February 2009); Mauritius, Morocco and Peru (March 2009); the Dominican Republic (November 2009); Senegal (February 2011); Argentina and Cabo Verde (March 2011); Panama (July 2013); Côte d'Ivoire, Kazakhstan and Tunisia (January 2015); the People's Republic of China (July 2015); Ghana and Uruguay (October 2015); Paraguay (March 2017), El Salvador and Guatemala (February 2019), Togo, Rwanda and Ecuador (May 2019). The European Union also takes part in the work of the Governing Board.

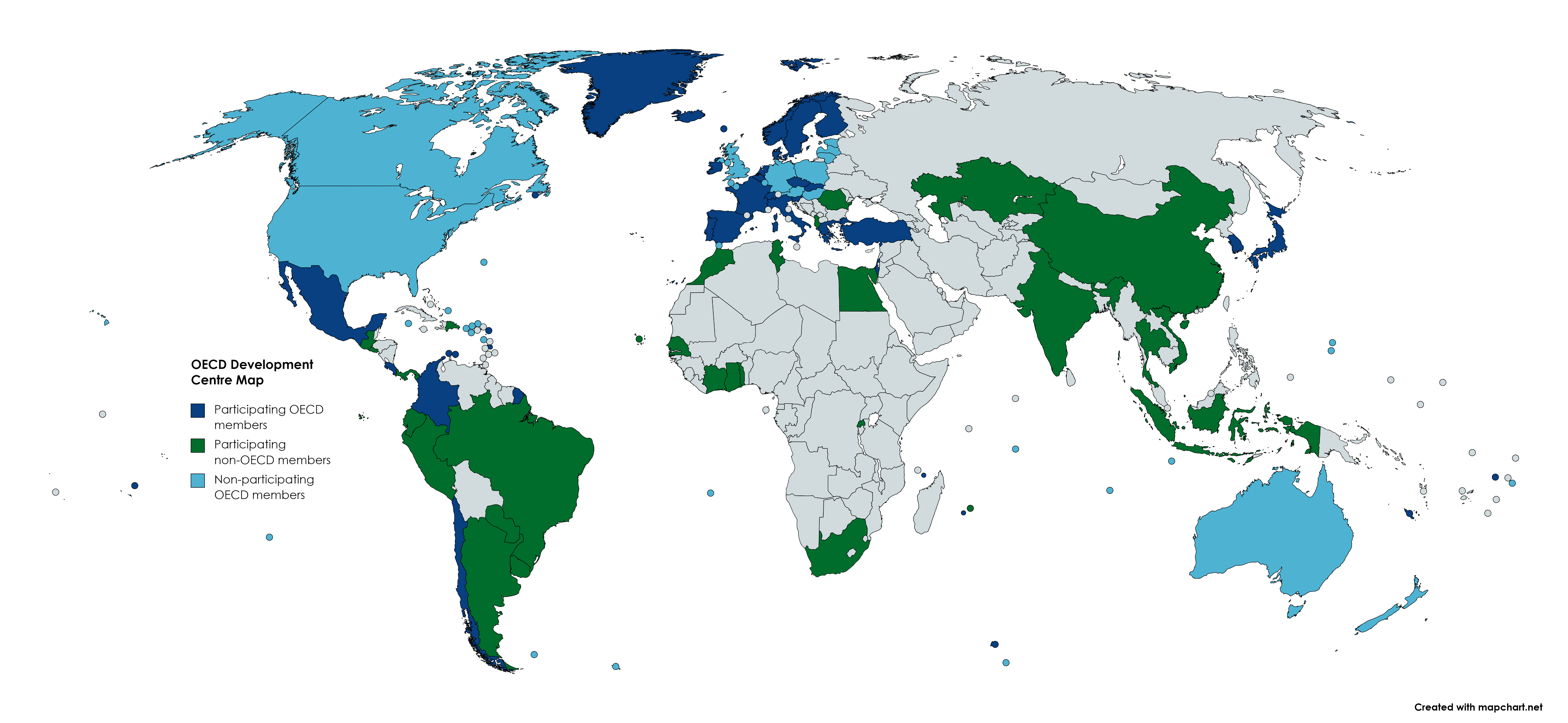
OECD Development Centre Map (latest version)

Member states

- Albania
- Argentina
- Belgium
- Brazil
- Cape Verde
- Chile
- China
- Colombia
- Costa Rica
- Ivory Coast
- Czech Republic
- Denmark
- Dominican Republic
- Ecuador
- Egypt
- El Salvador
- Finland
- France
- Ghana
- Greece
- Guatemala
- Iceland
- India
- Indonesia
- Ireland
- Israel
- Italy
- Japan
- Kazakhstan
- South Korea
- Mauritius
- Mexico
- Morocco
- Netherlands
- Norway
- Panama
- Paraguay
- Peru
- Portugal
- Romania
- Rwanda
- Senegal
- Slovakia
- Slovenia
- South Africa
- Spain
- Sweden
- Switzerland
- Thailand
- Togo
- Tunisia
- Turkey
- Uruguay
- Vietnam

Participating OECD members: Belgium, Chile, Colombia, Czech Republic, Costa Rica, Denmark, Finland, France, Greece, Iceland, Ireland, Israel, Italy, Japan, Korea, Mexico, Netherlands, Norway, Portugal, Slovak Republic, Slovenia, Spain, Sweden, Switzerland and Turkey.

Participating non-OECD members: Albania, Argentina, Brazil, Cabo Verde, China, Côte d'Ivoire, Dominican Republic, Ecuador, Egypt, El Salvador, Ghana, Guatemala, Guinea, India, Indonesia, Kazakhstan, Mauritius, Morocco, Panama, Paraguay, Peru, Romania, Rwanda, Senegal, South Africa, Thailand, Togo, Tunisia, Uruguay, Viet Nam.

Non-participating OECD members: Australia, Austria, Canada, Estonia, Germany, Hungary, United Kingdom, the United States and New Zealand.

== Activities ==
=== Policy dialogue and knowledge-sharing ===
- The Global Forum on Development (GFD). The GFD (focusing on “Preparing for the Post-2015 World” in 2013, 14 and 15) provides a venue for high-level policy makers and civil society to exchange perspectives, explore challenges, opportunities and learn lessons about current poverty reduction policies and methods for fostering social cohesion and progress.
- Regional International Economic Forums for Africa, Latin America and the Caribbean, and forthcoming for Asia attract participation by governments, international organisations, civil society, foundations, think tanks, the media, corporations and academia.
- As part of the Development Centre’s contribution to the OECD Strategy for Development, the Centre is leading efforts across the OECD Secretariat to establish a multi-year process of knowledge sharing and policy dialogue between OECD and partner countries facing similar development challenges, commencing with the:

- OECD Network for Policy dialogue on Natural-resource Driven Development, and
- OECD Network for Policy Dialogue on Global Value Chains

- The Development Centre has Networks of key stakeholders engaged in policy dialogue, producing relevant analysis, and sharing experience on policy reform for development. Some of these Networks attract experts as members but also offer opportunities for the Governing Board to participate in open sessions:

- Network of Multinationals: Emerging markets network (EmNet)
- Network of Foundations working on development netFWD)
- Network of Heads of Communication and Information in DAC Development Agencies to share good practices and engage in peer learning and on how effectively to raise public awareness and communicate about development cooperation (DevCom).

=== Cross sectoral analysis ===
- Multi-dimensional Country Reviews (MDCRs): a tool that contributes to the implementation of the OECD Strategy for Development and directly engages non-Members. The MDCRs provide national policy makers and their partners with the inputs needed for a nationally owned and implemented development strategy; underlining the set of concrete steps that will address the key constraints across all dimensions of national development. The national development strategy will help the country maintain momentum for the social and economic development needed, as well as identify and build effective strategies to achieve inclusive, sustainable and equitable growth that can improve the well-being of all citizens. The effectiveness of the MDCR's process cements the quality of the national development strategy.

=== Global, regional and country analysis ===
- Annual thematic flagship publication: OECD Perspectives on Global Development
- Regional Economic Outlooks in partnership with international organisations in each region:

- African Development Dynamics
- Latin American Economic Outlook
- Economic Outlook for Southeast Asia, China and India

- Regional/country studies: social cohesion policy reviews, gender, migration, youth inclusion, competitiveness, global value chains, taxation and middle-classes; innovation and territorial development, capital markets, etc.

=== Statistics and indicators ===
- Revenue Statistics: Africa; Latin America and Asia
- The OECD Social Institutions and Gender (SIGI) Index
- OECD-ASEAN Narrowing Development Gap Indicators (NDGIs)

== See also ==
- OECD Better Life Index
