= Indicator (statistics) =

Observed value of a variable in statistics

In statistics and research design, an indicator is an observed value of a variable, or in other words "a sign of a presence or absence of the concept being studied". Just like each color indicates in a traffic lights the change in the movement.

For example, if a variable is religiosity, and a unit of analysis is an individual, then that one of potentially more numerous indicators of that individual's religiosity would be whether they attend religious services; others - how often, or whether they donate money to religious organizations.

Numerous indicators can be aggregated into an index.

The complexity of biological systems makes evaluating them a challenge. Bioindicators, such as indicator bacteria, are ecological indicators, sometimes requiring further consideration of environmental indicators. In public health study, one relies on health indicators. In a given locality, community indicators inform planners, while the design quality indicator can be the basis of building permits. Assessment of social conditions relies on sustainability indicators or the genuine progress indicator. Standard measurements are given in the OECD Main Economic Indicators. A famous popular science individual psychological assessment is the Myers–Briggs Type Indicator.
