= Gender-related Development Index =

Statistical Index formerly used to measure Gender Equality

The Gender-related Development Index (GDI) is a composite index, introduced in the 1995 Human Development Report by the United Nations Development Programme (UNDP).

Along with Gender Empowerment Measure (GEM), these two indices are the first set of gender measures to rank countries based on their performance on gender equality and women's empowerment. GDI adjusts the Human Development Index (HDI) for gender disparities in life expectancy, educational attainment and income. This index could be seen as a penalty to HDI due to gender inequalities between women and men. It is never meant to directly measure gender gaps. GDI was published until the 2009 Human Development Report. The current GDI is the Gender Development Index, introduced since the 2014 Human Development Report by UNDP Human Development Report Office.
