= Deaths in January 2023 =

The following is a list of notable deaths in January 2023.

Entries for each day are listed alphabetically by surname. A typical entry lists information in the following sequence:

- Name, age, country of citizenship at birth, subsequent country of citizenship (if applicable), reason for notability, cause of death (if known), and reference.

== January 2023 ==
=== 1 ===
- Mario Artali, 84, Italian businessman and politician, deputy (1972–1976).
- Gangsta Boo, 43, American rapper (Three 6 Mafia), accidental drug overdose.
- Francisco Bozinovic, 63, Chilean-Croatian biologist and academic, cancer.
- Derek Clark, 89, British politician, MEP (2004–2014).
- Martin Davis, 94, American mathematician (Davis–Putnam algorithm).
- N. C. Debbarma, 80, Indian politician, Tripura MLA (since 2018), stroke.
- Georg Eberl, 86, German Olympic ice hockey player (1960).
- Fan Weitang, 87, Chinese mining engineer, member of the Chinese Academy of Engineering.
- Tetsuo Hasegawa, 84, Japanese actor (Mito Kōmon).
- Viktor Ivanenko, 75, Russian security officer.
- Bob Jongen, 95, German-born Dutch footballer (Alemannia Aachen, Fortuna 54, Roda Sport).
- R. K. Krishna Kumar, 84, Indian entrepreneur (Tata Sons, Sir Dorabji Tata and Allied Trusts), heart attack.
- Ron Labinski, 85, American architect (Oracle Park, Raymond James Stadium, M&T Bank Stadium).
- Edith Lank, 96, American author and advice columnist.
- Elizabeth Livingstone, 93, English Anglican theologian.
- Kadri Mälk, 64, Estonian visual artist and jewellery designer.
- Frank McGarvey, 66, Scottish footballer (St Mirren, Celtic, national team), pancreatic cancer.
- Art McNally, 97, American Hall of Fame football official, director of officiating for the NFL (1968–1991).
- Kelly Monteith, 80, American comedian.
- Meenakshi Narain, 58, Indian-born American experimental physicist.
- Lise Nørgaard, 105, Danish journalist and writer (Matador).
- James Ogiste, Tobagonian politician, MP (1981–1986).
- Edith Pearlman, 86, American short story writer.
- Apostolos Pitsos, 104, Greek industrialist and businessman.
- Sir Michael Rawlins, 81, British clinical pharmacologist, chair of the MHRA (2014–2020).
- Bohdan Rebryk, 84, Ukrainian political prisoner and politician, MP (1990–1994).
- Bobby Rivard, 83, Canadian ice hockey player (Pittsburgh Penguins), complications from Alzheimer's disease.
- Mako Sajko, 95, Slovenian director and screenwriter.
- Dave Schubert, 49, American street photographer.
- Jacques Sereys, 94, French actor (On Guard, Chouchou, Towards Zero).
- Anjali Singh, 20, Indian motorist, traffic collision.
- Donald Snyder, 86, American lieutenant general.
- Horrie Toole, 91, Australian rugby footballer.
- Lázaro Valdés, 82, Cuban son and jazz musician.
- Wang Hao, 92, Chinese military officer.
- Fred White, 67, American Hall of Fame drummer (Earth, Wind & Fire).
- Zhu Zushou, 77, Chinese diplomat, ambassador to Hungary (2003–2007) and the Netherlands (2001–2003), COVID-19.

=== 2 ===
- Alain Acart, 71, French Olympic sprint canoer (1972, 1976), heart attack.
- Lincoln Almond, 86, American politician and lawyer, governor of Rhode Island (1995–2003), U.S. attorney for the district of Rhode Island (1969–1978, 1981–1993).
- Ken Block, 55, American rally driver (Rally America, Global Rallycross), co-founder of DC Shoes, snowmobile rollover.
- Molly Corbett Broad, 81, American academic administrator, president of University of North Carolina (1997–2006) and the American Council on Education (2008–2017).
- Frank Cameron, 90, New Zealand cricketer (Otago, national team).
- Suzy McKee Charnas, 83, American novelist (The Kingdom of Kevin Malone, The Holdfast Chronicles) and short story writer ("Boobs").
- Alford Corriette, 74, Montserratian cricketer (Combined Islands, Leeward Islands, national team).
- Catherine David, 73, French-American literary critic and novelist.
- Roxanne Donnery, 79, American politician, cancer.
- Andrew Downes, 72, British classical composer.
- Cai Emmons, 71, American author and blogger, complications from amyotrophic lateral sclerosis.
- Viktor Fainberg, 91, Russian philologist and Soviet dissident.
- Frank Galati, 79, American theatre director (The Grapes of Wrath, Ragtime) and screenwriter (The Accidental Tourist), Tony winner (1990), cancer.
- Cliff Gustafson, 91, American Hall of Fame baseball coach (Texas Longhorns), heart failure.
- Richard H. Hanson, 91, American politician, member of the Minnesota House of Representatives (1967–1968).
- Nikos Hatzigiakoumis, 93, Greek Olympic rower (1956).
- Bobby Hogue, 83, American politician, member of the Arkansas House of Representatives (1979–1998).
- Kurt Horres, 90, German theatre director (Deutsche Oper am Rhein).
- Hu Fuming, 87, Chinese philosopher and politician, COVID-19.
- Thomas L. Hughes, 97, American government official, director of the Bureau of Intelligence and Research (1963–1969).
- John Huo Cheng, 96, Chinese Roman Catholic prelate, bishop of Fenyang (since 1991).
- Mubasshar Hussein, 79, Bangladeshi architect and independence activist.
- Peter Kelly, 87, British motorcycle speedway rider.
- Amélie Kuhrt, 78, British historian.
- Thomas Mace-Archer-Mills, 43, American monarchist.
- Jean Nehr, 93, French actor (Summer of '62, Plus belle la vie).
- King Phojanakong, 54, American chef, granulomatous amoebic encephalitis.
- Dumitru Radu Popescu, 87, Romanian novelist and poet.
- Marilyn Stafford, 97, American-born British photographer.
- Robert Stephan, 89, American lawyer and politician, Kansas attorney general (1979–1995).
- Siddeshwar Swami, 82, Indian Hindu religious leader.
- Kajsa Thoor, 51, Swedish television presenter, apartment fire.
- Vasil Timkovič, 99, Czechoslovak soldier.
- Abderrahim Tounsi, 86, Moroccan comedian.
- Wang Zhiliang, 94, Chinese translator.

=== 3 ===
- Keenan Anderson, 31, American hit-and-run suspect, complications from tasering.
- Jean-Marie André, 78, Belgian scientist.
- Armand Joel Banaken Bassoken, 39, Cameroonian footballer (Persewangi Banyuwangi, Persijap Jepara, PSPS Pekanbaru), traffic collision.
- Karim Bennani, 87, Moroccan painter.
- Alberto Borin, 82, Belgian politician, senator (1987–1991, 1994–1995) and MP (1995–1999).
- James D. Brubaker, 85, American film producer (Rocky, Bruce Almighty, Gia), multiple strokes.
- Danièle Brun, 84, French academic and psychologist.
- Ib Christensen, 92, Danish politician, MP (1973–1975, 1977–1981), MEP (1984–1994).
- Theo Coetzee, 74, South African politician, MP (2009–2014), cancer.
- Walter Cunningham, 90, American astronaut (Apollo 7), complications from a fall.
- Mohamed Enani, 83, Egyptian writer and translator.
- Kathy Hite, 74, American professional golfer.
- Elena Huelva, 20, Spanish influencer and writer, Ewing sarcoma.
- Laxman Pandurang Jagtap, 59, Indian politician, Maharashtra MLA (since 2009), cancer.
- Ruslan Khasbulatov, 80, Russian economist and politician, chairman of the Supreme Soviet (1991–1993).
- Greta Kiernan, 89, American politician, member of the New Jersey General Assembly (1978–1980).
- Joseph Koo, 91, Hong Kong film composer (The Way of the Dragon, Fist of Fury, A Terra-Cotta Warrior).
- Eric Low, 75, Singaporean politician.
- James Lowenstein, 95, American diplomat, ambassador to Luxembourg (1977–1981).
- Abdelsalam Majali, 97, Jordanian physician and politician, prime minister (1993–1995, 1997–1998).
- Aleksey Malashenko, 71, Russian academic and political scientist.
- Frederick J. Marshall, 71, American judge, justice of the New York Supreme Court (2000–2022), non-Hodgkin lymphoma.
- Notis Mavroudis, 77, Greek guitarist and composer, fall.
- Amber McLaughlin, 49, American convicted murderer, execution by lethal injection.
- Mimosa, 62, French magician.
- Silvio Parnis, 57, Maltese politician, MP (1998–2022), cancer.
- Petr Pavlásek, 75, Czech Olympic weightlifter (1972, 1976).
- Robbie Pierce, 63, American off-road racing driver, scuba diving accident.
- Mitică Popescu, 86, Romanian actor (The Earth's Most Beloved Son, The Moromete Family, The Moment).
- Theresa A. Powell, 70, American academic administrator.
- Alan Rankine, 64, Scottish musician (The Associates), heart failure.
- Nicolás Redondo, 95, Spanish union leader and politician, secretary general of the UGT (1976–1994) and deputy (1977–1987).
- Jeremy Salmond, 79, New Zealand heritage architect, NZIA Gold Medal winner (2018).
- Sergi Schaaff, 85, Spanish television producer (Saber y ganar, Ruta Quetzal).
- Seble Desta, 91, Ethiopian princess.
- Nate Thayer, 62, American journalist (Far Eastern Economic Review, Jane's Defence Weekly, Soldier of Fortune).
- Giorgio Tombesi, 96, Italian politician, deputy (1976–1983).
- Páll Vang, 73, Faroese politician, minister of agriculture, health, transport and justice (1981–1985).
- Norbert Werbs, 82, German Roman Catholic prelate and theologian, auxiliary bishop of Schwerin (1981–1994) and Hamburg (1994–2015).
- Zhao Qiguo, 92, Chinese soil scientist, member of the Chinese Academy of Sciences.
- Zhou Lingzhao, 103, Chinese painter.
- Lyuben Zidarov, 99, Bulgarian visual artist.

=== 4 ===
- Richard Bernal, 73, Jamaican diplomat and economist, ambassador to the United States (1991–2001).
- Jean Bertho, 94, French actor (La Marie du port, The Doctor's Horrible Experiment) and film director.
- Nabil Bukhalid, 65, Lebanese computer scientist, member of the Internet Hall of Fame, heart attack.
- Thomas Stonor, 7th Baron Camoys, 82, British banker and peer, lord chamberlain (1998–2000).
- Edwin Chiloba, 24–25, Kenyan fashion designer and LGBTQ activist, asphyxiation. (body discovered on this date)
- Kawika Crowley, 71, American politician, suicide by jumping.
- Arthur Duncan, 97, American tap dancer (The Lawrence Welk Show, The Betty White Show).
- Rei Jack Enoka, 83, Cook Islands politician, MP (1983, 1989–1994).
- Thirumagan Evera, 46, Indian politician, Tamil Nadu MLA (since 2021), cardiac arrest.
- Michel Ferté, 64, French racing driver (Formula 3000).
- Norman Fruchter, 85, American writer and academic, injuries sustained in a traffic collision.
- Renée Gailhoustet, 93, French architect.
- Ge Xiurun, 88, Chinese engineer, member of the Chinese Academy of Engineering.
- David Gold, 86, British retailer, publisher (Gold Star Publications), and football executive, chairman of West Ham United (since 2010).
- Casey Hayden, 85, American civil rights activist.
- Kléber Haye, 85, French engineer and politician, deputy (1981–1986).
- Elwood Hillis, 96, American politician, member of the U.S. House of Representatives (1971–1987).
- Stan Hitchcock, 86, American country singer, cancer.
- Pierre Joassin, 74, Belgian film director and screenwriter (Maigret, Josephine, Guardian Angel).
- Zoran Kalezić, 72, Serbian-Montenegrin singer, lung cancer.
- Erich Korbel, 81, Austrian Olympic speed skater (1964, 1968).
- Marie Kovářová, 95, Czech gymnast, Olympic champion (1948).
- Evelyn Lawler, 93, American hurdler.
- Wyllie Longmore, 82, Jamaican-born British actor (Love Actually), cancer.
- John Francis Lovering, 92, Australian geologist.
- Sławomir Maciejowski, 71, Polish Olympic rower (1972).
- Alan Mackay-Sim, 71, Australian biomedical scientist.
- Benedict Majekodunmi, 82, Nigerian Olympic sprinter (1968, 1972). (death announced on this date)
- Elizabeth Midlarsky, 81, American psychologist.
- Rosi Mittermaier, 72, German alpine skier, double Olympic champion (1976).
- Géza Morcsányi, 70, Hungarian playwright and actor (On Body and Soul).
- Calvin Muhammad, 64, American football player (Los Angeles Raiders, Washington Redskins, San Diego Chargers).
- Marino Penna, 93, Chilean chemical engineer and politician, deputy (1965–1973).
- Beeyar Prasad, 61, Indian lyricist (Kilichundan Mampazham, Njan Salperu Ramankutty, Vamanapuram Bus Route), complications from a stroke.
- Volodymyr Radchenko, 74, Ukrainian politician and intelligence officer, vice prime minister (2007), minister of internal affairs (1994–1995) and twice head of the SBU.
- David A. Rausch, 75, American historian and author.
- Hans Rebele, 79, German footballer (1860 Munich West Germany national team).
- Sim Wong Hoo, 67, Singaporean entrepreneur, founder of Creative Technology.
- Anton Schnider, 86, Swiss footballer (BSC Young Boys, FC Grenchen, national team).
- Miiko Taka, 97, American actress (Sayonara; The Art of Love; Walk, Don't Run).
- Maarten van Emden, 85, Dutch-Canadian mathematician and computer scientist.
- Fay Weldon, 91, British author (The Life and Loves of a She-Devil, Puffball, The Cloning of Joanna May), essayist and playwright.
- Wu Sheng, 88, Chinese nuclear engineer, member of the Chinese Academy of Engineering.
- Xu Mi, 85, Chinese nuclear engineer, member of the Chinese Academy of Engineering.

=== 5 ===
- Magomed Abdulaev, 61, Russian lawyer and politician, prime minister of Dagestan (2010–2013), traffic collision.
- Ruth Adler Schnee, 99, German-born American textile and interior designer.
- Gaspar Ariño Ortiz, 86, Spanish lawyer, professor and politician, deputy (1989–1993).
- Joseph Biederman, 75, American academic psychiatrist.
- Earl Boen, 81, American actor (The Terminator, Bonkers, World of Warcraft), lung cancer.
- Renate Boy, 83, German shot putter, Olympic silver medallist (1964).
- Mark Capps, 54, American sound engineer, shot.
- Jim Carmody, 89, American football coach (Southern Miss).
- Ernesto Castano, 83, Italian footballer (Triestina, Juventus, national team).
- Jean Clémentin, 98, French journalist (Le Canard enchaîné), writer, and spy.
- Nate Colbert, 76, American baseball player (San Diego Padres, Houston Astros, Detroit Tigers).
- Sarah Doherty, 63, American amputee mountaineer, ski racer, and motivational speaker.
- Carl Duser, 90, American baseball player (Kansas City Athletics).
- Martin Fabi, 80, Canadian football player (Saskatchewan Roughriders, Montreal Alouettes).
- Eugene Geesey, 91, American politician, member of the Pennsylvania House of Representatives (1969–1980).
- Herbert Gintis, 82, American economist, behavioral scientist and author (Schooling in Capitalist America).
- Mike Hill, 73, American film editor (Apollo 13, Rush, Frost/Nixon), Oscar winner (1996), cryptogenic organizing pneumonia.
- Kim Deok-ju, 89, South Korean lawyer and judge, chief justice (1990–1993).
- Mondeño, 88, Spanish torero.
- Mahir Muradov, 66, Azerbaijani judge, member of the Constitutional Court (since 2012).
- Giorgio Otranto, 82, Italian historian, cerebral hemorrhage.
- John Joseph Thomas Owen, 88, English immunologist.
- Fred Parkinson, 93, American pharmacist and politician, member of the Oregon House of Representatives (1981–1993).
- Russell Pearce, 75, American politician, member (2006–2011) and president (2011) of the Arizona Senate.
- Ernesto Alfredo Piñón de la Cruz, 33, Mexican criminal (Los Mexicles), shot.
- Albert Rachkov, 95, Russian diplomat and politician, second secretary of the Communist Party of Turkmenistan (1980–1986).
- Michael Snow, 94, Canadian filmmaker (Wavelength, Back and Forth) and artist (Flight Stop).
- Dušan Veličković, 75–76, Serbian writer, journalist and filmmaker.
- Buddhi Wickrama, 83, Sri Lankan actor (Anthima Reya, Water, Lantin Singho).
- Quentin Williams, 39, American politician, member of the Connecticut House of Representatives (since 2019), traffic collision.
- Yang Fuyu, 95, Chinese biochemist, member of the Chinese Academy of Sciences.

=== 6 ===
- Sadiq al-Ahmar, 66, Yemeni politician and tribal leader, MP (1993–2011), cancer.
- Benjamin Almoneda, 92, Filipino Roman Catholic prelate, auxiliary bishop (1990–1991) and bishop (1991–2007) of Daet.
- Benjamin Bederson, 101, American physicist (Manhattan Project).
- Fred Benners, 92, American football player (New York Giants).
- Omar Berdiýew, 43, Turkmen footballer (Esil Bogatyr, Dinamo Samarqand, national team).
- George W. Bryan, 78, American businessman.
- Bill Campbell, 74, American baseball player (Minnesota Twins, Boston Red Sox, Chicago Cubs), cancer.
- Marc-Kanyan Case, 80, French Olympic footballer (1968).
- Slaheddine Cherif, 85, Tunisian government official.
- Gervasio Gestori, 86, Italian Roman Catholic prelate, bishop of San Benedetto del Tronto-Ripatransone-Montalto (1996–2013).
- Jacques Grattarola, 92, French footballer (Cannes, Saint-Étienne).
- Ernst Grissemann, 88, Austrian radio host.
- Peter Hoffmann, 92, German-Canadian historian.
- Sir Patrick Hogan, 83, New Zealand Hall of Fame racehorse breeder.
- Lew Hunter, 87, American screenwriter and screenwriting teacher, COVID-19.
- Steve James, 72, American blues musician.
- John Warren Johnson, 93, American businessman and politician, member of the Minnesota House of Representatives (1966–1974).
- Danny Kaleikini, 85, American Hawaiian entertainer and singer.
- David S. Laustsen, 75, American politician, member of the South Dakota House of Representatives (1977–1984) and senate (1985–1987).
- Lorna Lee, 91, British Olympic long jumper (1948).
- Vincent Lindo, 86, Jamaican cricketer (Nottinghamshire, Somerset).
- Annette McCarthy, 64, American actress (Twin Peaks, Creature, Baywatch).
- Stuart McCutcheon, 68, New Zealand academic administrator, vice-chancellor of the University of Auckland (2005–2020) and Victoria University of Wellington (2000–2004).
- Frank Molden, 80, American football player (Los Angeles Rams, Philadelphia Eagles, New York Giants).
- Carlos Monín, 83, Paraguayan football player (Toulouse, Red Star, national team) and manager.
- Theodore R. Newman Jr., 88, American jurist, judge (1976–2016) and chief judge (1976–1984) of the D.C. Court of Appeals, judge of the Superior Court of D.C. (1970–1976).
- Nguyễn Thọ Chân, 100, Vietnamese politician, minister of labor (1974–1981).
- Sigifredo Ochoa, 80, Salvadoran military officer and politician, deputy (2012–2015), traffic collision.
- David Penington, 92, Australian physician and academic administrator, vice-chancellor of the University of Melbourne (1988–1995).
- Karl Pfeifer, 94, Austrian journalist (Jungle World).
- Paula Quintana, 66, Chilean sociologist and politician, minister of planning (2008–2010).
- Owen Roizman, 86, American cinematographer (The Exorcist, Network, The French Connection).
- Renzo Sacco, 78, Italian politician, president of the Province of Padua (1995–1998).
- Dick Savitt, 95, American Hall of Fame tennis player.
- Shen Lyu-shun, 73, Taiwanese diplomat, representative to the United States (2014–2016) and the United Kingdom (2011–2014).
- Victoria de Stefano, 82, Italian-Venezuelan novelist.
- Axel Troost, 68, German politician, MP (2005–2017, 2021).
- Jānis Vagris, 92, Latvian politician, chairman of the Presidium of the Supreme Soviet of the Latvian Soviet Socialist Republic (1985–1988).
- Gianluca Vialli, 58, Italian football player (Juventus, national team) and manager (Chelsea), pancreatic cancer.
- Vivian Tomlinson Williams, 84, American fiddler and composer, complications from amyotropic lateral sclerosis.

=== 7 ===
- Russell Banks, 82, American novelist (Continental Drift, The Sweet Hereafter, Cloudsplitter), cancer.
- Toni Batllori, 71–72, Spanish cartoonist.
- Karon Blake, 13, American child, shot.
- Miroslav Celler, 31, Slovak squash player, fall.
- Djão, 64, Mozambican-born Portuguese footballer (Belenenses, Penafiel, national team).
- Marcelle Engelen Faber, 99, French resistance fighter.
- Marilyn R. Goldwater, 95, American politician, member of the Maryland House of Delegates (1995–2007).
- Joseph A. Hardy III, 100, American lumber industry executive, founder of 84 Lumber.
- Mary Ellen Hawkins, 99, American politician, member of the Florida House of Representatives (1974–1994).
- Rob Heming, 90, Australian rugby union player (New South Wales, national team).
- Henri Heurtebise, 86, French poet and editor.
- Mohammad Hosseini, 39, Iranian dissident, execution by hanging.
- Walter Intemann, 78, Swiss-born Austrian businessman and politician, member of the Landtag of Vorarlberg (1979–1989).
- Nazrul Islam, 73, Indian politician, Assam MLA (1996–2021).
- Zeke Jabbour, 94, American bridge player, complications from Parkinson's disease.
- Mohammad Mehdi Karami, 21, Iranian dissident, execution by hanging.
- Habib Ullah Khan, 87, Bangladeshi politician and diplomat, MP (1979–1982), minister of information and broadcasting (1977–1981) and textiles and jute (1981–1982).
- Aleksandr Kharchikov, 73, Russian folk singer-songwriter.
- Sufia Khatun, 100, Bangladeshi author and social activist.
- William S. W. Lim, 90, Singaporean architect (Marine Parade Community Building, People's Park Complex, Golden Mile Complex).
- Modeste M'bami, 40, Cameroonian footballer (Sedan, PSG, national team), Olympic champion (2000), heart attack.
- Yuri Manin, 85, Russian mathematician (Gauss–Manin connection).
- John L. Meisenheimer, 89, American chemist.
- Zinaid Memišević, 72, Bosnian-Serbian actor (2012, Miracle, Bolji život).
- Charley Morgan, 93, Australian sailboat racer and designer.
- Sinikiwe Mpofu, 37, Zimbabwean cricket player (national team) and coach (Southerns).
- Philemon Mulala, 59–60, Zambian footballer (Mufulira Wanderers, Cape Town Spurs, national team), injuries sustained from a dog attack.
- Tony Pantano, 74, Italian-born Australian singer and entertainer, cancer.
- Naomi Replansky, 104, American poet.
- Adam Rich, 54, American actor (Eight Is Enough, Dungeons & Dragons, The Devil and Max Devlin), accidental fentanyl overdose.
- Karl Schüßler, 98, German Olympic cross-country skier (1952).
- Ken Scotland, 86, Scottish rugby union player (Leicester Tigers, national team) and cricketer (national team), cancer.
- Manfred Steiner, 91, Austrian-born American hematologist and physicist.
- Dorothy Tristan, 88, American actress (Klute, Scarecrow) and screenwriter (Weeds), complications from Alzheimer's disease.
- Tehemton Erach Udwadia, 88, Indian surgeon and gastroenterologist.

=== 8 ===
- Charles David Allis, 71, American molecular biologist, cancer.
- Delma S. Arrigoitia, 77, Puerto Rican historian and author.
- Gundars Bērziņš, 63, Latvian accountant and politician, minister of finance (2000–2002) and deputy (since 1993).
- Sietse Bosgra, 87, Dutch political activist.
- Arnie Coro, 80, Cuban radio presenter, co-founder of Radio Havana Cuba.
- Borislav Dević, 59, Serbian Olympic marathoner (1996).
- Roberto Dinamite, 68, Brazilian footballer (Vasco da Gama, national team) and politician, deputy (1995–2015), colon cancer.
- Willem Doise, 87, Belgian academic and psychologist.
- Mduduzi Fuzwayo, 36, Zimbabwean cricketer (Matabeleland Tuskers), traffic collision.
- Juan Francisco García, 69, Mexican Olympic boxer (1972).
- Patrick Grimlund, 50, Swedish television presenter, traffic collision.
- Georgina Hammick, 83, English author.
- Lynnette Hardaway, 51, American conservative activist (Diamond and Silk), heart disease.
- Jack W. Hayford, 88, American Pentecostal minister and hymn writer, founder of The King's University.
- Bernard Kalb, 100, American journalist (Reliable Sources, The New York Times) and civil servant, assistant secretary of state for public affairs (1985–1986), complications from a fall.
- Siegfried Kurz, 92, German conductor and composer.
- Michel Laurencin, 78, French academic and historian.
- Barry Lines, 80, English footballer (Northampton Town).
- Harold Martens, 81, Canadian rancher and politician, Saskatchewan MLA (1982–1995).
- Ray Middleton, 86, British Olympic racewalker (1964), respiratory failure.
- Slim Newton, 90, Australian country music singer-songwriter (The Redback on the Toilet Seat).
- Christiane Papon, 98, French politician, MEP (1987–1989) and deputy (1988–1993).
- Luis Gabriel Ramírez Díaz, 57, Colombian Roman Catholic prelate, bishop of El Banco (2014–2021) and Ocaña (since 2021).
- Antonio Rucco, 91, Italian Olympic sprint canoer (1960).
- Aleksandr Shabanov, 87, Russian chemist and politician, deputy (1995–2003).
- Georgy Shayduko, 60, Russian sailor, Olympic silver medallist (1996), cardiac arrest.
- Aleksey Slapovsky, 65, Russian novelist, playwright and screenwriter (The Irony of Fate 2), pneumonia.
- William N. Still Jr., 90, American maritime historian.
- Walter Tosta, 66, Brazilian politician, deputy (2011–2015).
- Keshari Nath Tripathi, 88, Indian politician, Uttar Pradesh MLA (1977–1980, 1989–2007), governor of West Bengal (2014–2019) and twice of Bihar.
- Adriaan Vlok, 85, South African politician, minister of correctional services (1991–1994).
- C. Anne Wilson, 95, British food historian.
- Wu Tao, 82, Chinese diplomat, ambassador to Portugal (1992–1994), Russia (1998–2001) and Australia (2001–2003), COVID-19.

=== 9 ===
- Peace Anyiam-Osigwe, 53, Nigerian filmmaker and entertainment executive.
- Ali Reza Ashrafi, 58, Iranian mathematician, traffic collision.
- Yahya Baş, 71, Turkish politician, MP (2002–2007) and mayor of Güngören (1992–2002).
- Séamus Begley, 73, Irish musician.
- Hermann-Josef Blanke, 65, German academic and legal scholar.
- Stefan Brzózka, 91, Polish chess player.
- Max Chantal, 64, French rugby league player (Villeneuve XIII, national team).
- William Consovoy, 48, American attorney, brain cancer.
- James Crotty, 82, American macroeconomist, complications from Parkinson's disease.
- Zhanna Arshanskaya Dawson, 95, Russian-American pianist and Holocaust survivor.
- Melinda Dillon, 83, American actress (Close Encounters of the Third Kind, Absence of Malice, A Christmas Story).
- David Duckham, 76, English rugby union player (Coventry, national team).
- Dick Flood, 90, American country singer and environmentalist.
- Ahmaad Galloway, 42, American football player (Denver Broncos, San Diego Chargers, Frankfurt Galaxy).
- Adolfo Kaminsky, 97, Argentine-born French forger and resistant.
- Yoshito Kishi, 85, Japanese chemist (Nozaki–Hiyama–Kishi reaction), stroke.
- Simone Kramer, 83, Dutch author.
- Thomas Kretschmer, 68, German politician, member of the Landtag of Thuringia (1990–2008).
- Hans Krieger, 89, German journalist, essayist and poet.
- Magnar Mangersnes, 84, Norwegian organist and choral conductor.
- Yoriaki Matsudaira, 91, Japanese composer, pneumonia.
- Raymond Mertens, 89, Belgian football player (Royal Uccle Sport) and coach.
- Ferenc Mészáros, 72, Hungarian footballer (Vasas SC, Vitória de Setúbal, national team).
- Lesego Motsumi, 58, Botswana politician, minister of health (2003–2004, 2008–2009) and works and transport (2004–2008), high commissioner to India (2011–2020), burns.
- K. Alex Müller, 95, Swiss physicist, Nobel Prize laureate (1987).
- Timothy Nga, 49, Singaporean actor (First Class).
- Gerry O'Hara, 98, British film and television director (That Kind of Girl, The Bitch, The Professionals).
- Virginia Kraft Payson, 92, American thoroughbred horse breeder and sports journalist (Sports Illustrated), complications from Parkinson's disease.
- Cincy Powell, 80, American basketball player (Dallas Chaparrals, Kentucky Colonels, Virginia Squires).
- Rehman Rahi, 97, Indian poet.
- Edgar Samuel, 94, British museum director, director of the London Jewish Museum (1983–1995).
- Mikio Sato, 94, Japanese mathematician (Sato–Tate conjecture, Bernstein–Sato polynomial).
- Tim Schadla-Hall, 75, British archaeologist.
- Charles Simic, 84, Serbian-born American poet, complications from dementia.
- Vladimir Timochkin, 86, Russian politician, member of the Supreme Soviet (1979–1989).
- Rainer Ulrich, 73, German football player (Karlsruher SC) and coach (SSV Ulm, VfR Mannheim).
- Uyen Sinwa Nhpan Ja Ra, 91, Burmese Kachin singer.
- Norma Whiteman, 95, Australian cricketer (New South Wales, national team).
- Zhang Jinlin, 86, Chinese engineer, member of the Chinese Academy of Engineering.
- George S. Zimbel, 93, American-Canadian documentary photographer.

=== 10 ===
- Sara Aboobacker, 86, Indian writer and translator.
- Jorge Ballesteros, 39, Spanish sports shooter, shot.
- Jeff Beck, 78, British Hall of Fame guitarist (The Yardbirds, The Jeff Beck Group), six-time Grammy winner, bacterial meningitis.
- Hans Belting, 87, German art historian.
- Gaudenzio Bernasconi, 90, Italian footballer (Atalanta, Sampdoria, national team).
- Black Warrior, 54, Mexican professional wrestler (CMLL).
- Gregory Blackstock, 77, American artist.
- Donald Blom, 73, American murderer.
- Lothar Blumhagen, 95, German actor (Sommerliebe).
- Dennis Budimir, 84, American jazz and rock guitarist (The Wrecking Crew).
- Jorge O. Calvo, 61, Argentine geologist and paleontologist.
- Hermenegildo Candeias, 88, Portuguese Olympic gymnast (1960).
- Constantine II, 82, Greek monarch and sailor, king (1964–1973) and Olympic champion (1960), stroke.
- Alain da Costa, 87, Gabonese football manager (USM Libreville, Vantour Mangoungou, national team).
- István Deák, 96, Hungarian-born American historian, member of the Hungarian Academy of Sciences.
- Pierre Dorsini, 88, French footballer (Toulouse, Nancy).
- Shirley Dynevor, 89, Welsh actress (Charlesworth, Rogue Male, The Wednesday Play).
- Kalle Eller, 82, Estonian publisher, cultural researcher and poet.
- José Evangelista, 79, Spanish composer.
- Jean Gevenois, 91, Belgian politician, senator (1983–1996).
- Jeff Hamilton, 56, American Olympic speed skier (1992), pancreatic cancer.
- He Ping, 65, Chinese film director (Swordsmen in Double Flag Town, Sun Valley, Warriors of Heaven and Earth), heart attack.
- Traudl Hecher, 79, Austrian ski racer, Olympic bronze medallist (1960, 1964).
- Kevin Higgins, 55, Irish poet, leukaemia.
- Blake Hounshell, 44, American journalist (The New York Times, Politico, Foreign Policy), suicide by jumping.
- Irenaios, 83, Greek Orthodox prelate, patriarch of the Greek Orthodox Patriarchate of Jerusalem (2001–2005).
- Majid Jahangir, 74, Pakistani comedian (Fifty Fifty).
- Jeanne Kangas, 82, American lawyer and politician, interim chair of the Massachusetts Republican Party (2011).
- Jean Leccia, 84, French composer, conductor, and pianist.
- Sezi Mbaguta, 76, Ugandan politician, MP (2011–2016).
- Bruce Murray, 82, New Zealand cricketer (Wellington, national team).
- Tyre Nichols, 29, American motorist, subject of Tyre Nichols protests.
- George Pell, 81, Australian Roman Catholic cardinal, archbishop of Melbourne (1996–2001) and Sydney (2001–2014), prefect of the Secretariat for the Economy (2014–2019), complications from hip surgery.
- Natalya Ryazantseva, 84, Russian screenwriter (Wings, The Long Farewell, The Voice).
- Roy Schwitters, 78, American physicist, cancer.
- Christopher T. Walsh, 78, American biochemist, member of the National Academy of Sciences, fall.
- Daniel Lewis Williams, 79, American operatic basso profondo, complications from Alzheimer's disease.

=== 11 ===
- Agnes Flight, 25, Japanese Thoroughbred racehorse, euthanized.
- Eduardo Amorós, 79, Spanish Olympic equestrian (1976).
- Shimon Baadani, 94, Israeli Orthodox rabbi, pneumonia.
- Francis L. Bodine, 87, American politician, member of the New Jersey General Assembly (1994–2008).
- Peter Campbell, 62, American water polo player, Olympic silver medallist (1984, 1988).
- Carole Cook, 98, American actress (The Lucy Show, The Incredible Mr. Limpet, Sixteen Candles), heart failure.
- Günther Deschner, 81, German author and historian.
- Piers Haggard, 83, British director (Pennies From Heaven).
- Harriet Hall, 77, American Air Force flight surgeon.
- Enamul Haque, 83, Bangladeshi politician, MP (1986–1988).
- Bob Harrison, 92, American baseball player (Baltimore Orioles).
- Hussein el-Husseini, 85, Lebanese politician, speaker of parliament (1984–1992).
- Charles Kimbrough, 86, American actor (Murphy Brown, The Hunchback of Notre Dame, The Wedding Planner).
- Doming Lam, 96, Macanese-born Hong Kong classical composer.
- Ben Masters, 75, American actor (Passions, All That Jazz, HeartBeat), COVID-19.
- Antonio Muratore, 95, Italian politician, senator (1983–1994).
- Pavlo Naumenko, 57, Ukrainian aerospace engineer.
- Nian Guangjiu, 82, Chinese entrepreneur and melon seed producer.
- Rafiq Nishonov, 96, Uzbek politician, chairman of the Soviet Nationalities (1989–1991) and first secretary of the Communist Party (1988–1989).
- Eli Ostreicher, 39, British-born American serial entrepreneur, traffic collision.
- Tatjana Patitz, 56, German model and actress (Rising Sun), breast cancer.
- Murtaza Rakhimov, 88, Russian politician, president of Bashkortostan (1993–2010).
- François Roussely, 78, French government official and magistrate, president of Électricité de France (1998–2004).
- Christian Sauvé, 79, French painter.
- Kamel Tahir, 78, Algerian footballer (USM Alger, JS Kabylie, national team).
- Yukihiro Takahashi, 70, Japanese drummer and singer (Yellow Magic Orchestra, Sadistic Mika Band, Metafive), pneumonia.
- Charles White, 64, American football player (Cleveland Browns, Los Angeles Rams), Heisman Trophy winner (1979), liver cancer.
- Vera Yurasova, 94, Russian physicist.

=== 12 ===
- Cecilia Gyan Amoah, 75, Ghanaian politician and diplomat, MP (2001–2005).
- Robbie Bachman, 69, Canadian drummer (Bachman–Turner Overdrive).
- Drucilla K. Barker, 73, American feminist economist.
- Els Bendheim, 99, Dutch-Israeli theologian and philanthropist.
- Harold Brown, 98, American Air Force officer (Tuskegee Airmen).
- Mike Cardinal, 81, Canadian politician, Alberta MLA (1989–2008).
- Sanjay Chauhan, 60, Indian screenwriter (I Am Kalam, Paan Singh Tomar, Saheb, Biwi Aur Gangster Returns), liver disease.
- Gerrie Coetzee, 67, South African boxer, WBA heavyweight champion (1983–1984), lung cancer.
- Bob Cunnell, 80, English cricketer (Suffolk), pneumonia.
- Henri De Wolf, 86, Belgian racing cyclist.
- David Doctorian, 88, American politician, member of the Missouri Senate (1977–1991).
- Vittorio Garatti, 95, Italian architect.
- Frene Ginwala, 90, South African politician and academic administrator, speaker of the National Assembly (1994–2004), chancellor of the UKZN (2005–2007), complications from a stroke.
- Toos Grol-Overling, 91, Dutch teacher and politician, senator (1982–1999).
- Mozammel Haque, 67, Bangladeshi politician, MP (2001–2006).
- Delwar Hossain, 67, Bangladeshi politician, MP (2001–2006), kidney disease.
- John Ingersoll, 93, American police officer.
- Paul Johnson, 94, British journalist and historian (Modern Times: A History of the World from the 1920s to the 1980s, A History of the American People, A History of Christianity).
- Otohiko Kaga, 93, Japanese author.
- Felix Karasev, 93, Russian KGB general and Soviet diplomat.
- Elka Konstantinova, 90, Bulgarian literary critic and politician, MP (1991–1994), minister of culture (1991–1992).
- Jean Laurent, 78, French banker and businessman, managing director of Crédit Agricole (1999–2005).
- Valentyna Lutayeva, 66, Ukrainian handball player, Olympic champion (1980).
- Sulambek Mamilov, 84, Russian film director (Ladies' Tango, Day of Wrath, The Murder at Zhdanovskaya).
- Roy Pierpoint, 93, British racing driver, saloon car champion (1965).
- Lisa Marie Presley, 54, American singer-songwriter ("Lights Out", "You Ain't Seen Nothin' Yet"), small bowel obstruction.
- Mary Rawcliffe, 80, American soprano.
- Daniel Richard, 78, French entrepreneur.
- Ted Savage, 85, American baseball player (St. Louis Cardinals, Chicago Cubs, Los Angeles Dodgers).
- Sidharth Sharma, 28, Indian cricketer (Himachal Pradesh).
- Bruce Sharp, 91, Australian Olympic gymnast (1956).
- Carl-Gustaf Styrenius, 93, Swedish classical archaeologist.
- Maggie Telfer, 63, British health activist.
- Lee Tinsley, 53, American baseball player (Boston Red Sox, Seattle Mariners, Philadelphia Phillies).
- Charles Treger, 87, American violinist.
- Brian Tufano, 83, English cinematographer (Trainspotting, Billy Elliot, Shallow Grave).
- Charlotte Vale-Allen, 81, Canadian-born American contemporary fiction writer.
- Elliot Valenstein, 99, American neuroscientist and psychologist.
- Bobby Wood, 87, American politician, member of the Tennessee House of Representatives (1976–2004).
- Sharad Yadav, 75, Indian politician, MP (1974–1980, 1986–2017), minister of consumer affairs, food and public distribution (2002–2004).

=== 13 ===
- Madeleine Attal, 101, French actress and theatre director.
- Odd Bergh, 85, Norwegian athlete.
- Sir Alan Budd, 85, British economist, chairman of the Office for Budget Responsibility (2010), heart attack.
- Reginald Cooray, 75, Sri Lankan politician, three-time MP, chief minister of Western Province (2000–2009) and governor of Northern Province (2016–2018), heart attack.
- Ray Cordeiro, 98, Hong Kong disc jockey (RTHK Radio 3) and actor (Games Gamblers Play, Security Unlimited).
- Country Boy Eddie, 92, American country musician and television host.
- Bill Davis, 80, American baseball player (Cleveland Indians, San Diego Padres).
- Narsingh Deo, 87, American computer scientist.
- Peter W. Hutchins, 77, Canadian legal scholar.
- Kai Kalima, 77, Finnish lawyer and politician, MP (1989–1991).
- Dick M. Kelly, 81, American politician.
- Robbie Knievel, 60, American daredevil and stuntman, pancreatic cancer.
- Klas Lestander, 91, Swedish biathlete, Olympic champion (1960).
- Mao Zhi, 90, Chinese engineer, member of the Chinese Academy of Engineering.
- Laila Mikkelsen, 82, Norwegian film director (Little Ida, Oss) and producer (Nedtur).
- James L. Morse, 82, American jurist, justice of the Vermont Supreme Court (1988–2003).
- Eve Pearce, 93, Scottish actress (Coronation Street, Please Sir!).
- Fañch Peru, 82, French teacher, writer and politician, mayor of Berhet (1983–2001).
- Zenon Pigoń, 82, Polish trade unionist and politician, MP (1989–1991).
- Mani Prasad, 93, Indian singer.
- Michael Reid, 78, English evangelist, founder of the Peniel Pentecostal Church.
- Julian Sands, 65, British actor (A Room with a View, The Killing Fields, Leaving Las Vegas), hiking accident.
- Enaxon Siddiqova, 68, Uzbek poet and politician, senator (since 2015).
- Ted Whitehead, 89, English playwright and television writer (The Life and Loves of a She-Devil, First Born).
- Claudio Willer, 82, Brazilian poet and translator, bladder cancer.
- Thomasina Winslow, 57, American blues musician, stroke.
- Marc Worth, 61, British fashion executive, co-founder of WGSN, heart attack.
- Yoshio Yoda, 88, Japanese-born American actor (McHale's Navy, The Horizontal Lieutenant).

=== 14 ===
- Alireza Akbari, 61, Iranian-British politician and convicted spy, deputy minister of defence (1998–2003), execution by hanging. (death announced on this date)
- Brenda Almond, 85, British philosopher.
- Les Barker, 75, English poet.
- Gianfranco Baruchello, 98, Italian painter.
- Ronald Blythe, 100, English writer and columnist (Church Times).
- Wally Campo, 99, American actor (Machine-Gun Kelly, The Little Shop of Horrors, Master of the World).
- Matthias Carras, 58, German pop singer, cancer.
- Zdeněk Češka, 93, Czech lawyer, academic and politician, member of the Chamber of People of Czechoslovakia (1976–1981).
- Santokh Singh Chaudhary, 76, Indian politician, MP (since 2014), heart attack.
- Inna Churikova, 79, Russian actress (Jack Frost, The Very Same Munchhausen, Walking the Streets of Moscow).
- Bernard Delemotte, 83, French diver and cameraman.
- Sunder Lal Dixit, 80, Indian politician, three-time Uttar Pradesh MLA, fall.
- Don Easterling, 90, American swimming coach.
- Georgy Gagloev, 25, Russian mixed martial artist, strangled.
- Ruby Ghaznavi, 88, Bangladeshi businesswoman and activist.
- Juhan af Grann, 78, Finnish film director and unidentified flying object documentary filmmaker.
- Carl Hahn, 96, German automotive industry executive, chairman of Volkswagen Group (1982–1993).
- Genie Z. Laborde, 94, American author.
- Craig Lowe, 65, American politician, mayor of Gainesville (2010–2013).
- Barbara Migeon, 91, American geneticist.
- Poul-Erik Nielsen, 91, Danish badminton player.
- Femi Ogunrombi, Nigerian actor and ethnomusicologist.
- David Onley, 72, Canadian journalist, writer and politician, lieutenant governor of Ontario (2007–2014).
- Qian Yitai, 82, Chinese chemist, member of the Chinese Academy of Sciences.
- Mansa Ram, 82, Indian politician, Himachal Pradesh MLA (1967–1977, 1982–1985, 1998–2003), kidney failure.
- Trifonio Salazar, 74, Filipino military officer.
- Hermann A. Schlögl, 85, German actor and Egyptologist.
- Ted Thomas, 95, English Anglican clergyman, archdeacon of Wells (1983–1993).
- Miyuki Ueta, 49, Japanese murderer, asphyxiation.
- Lieuwe Westra, 40, Dutch Olympic cyclist (2012), heart failure.

=== 15 ===
- John Alcock, 80, American behavioral ecologist and author.
- Alexis Arette, 95, French farmer, writer, and politician, member of the Regional Council of Aquitaine (1986–1998).
- Leonid Barbier, 85, Ukrainian Olympic swimmer (1960).
- Ed Beard, 83, American football player (San Francisco 49ers), complications from Alzheimer's disease.
- Jane Cederqvist, 77, Swedish swimmer, Olympic silver medallist (1960), complications from amyotrophic lateral sclerosis.
- Chen Qizhi, 97, Chinese military officer and academic administrator, deputy (1975–1983) and president of NUDT (1990–1994).
- Victoria Chick, 86, American economist.
- Noël Coulet, 90, French academic and historian.
- Doris, 75, Swedish pop singer.
- Bruce Gowers, 82, British television and music video director ("Bohemian Rhapsody", "Stayin' Alive", "1999"), Emmy winner (2009).
- C. J. Harris, 31, American singer (American Idol), heart attack.
- Piet van Heusden, 93, Dutch track cyclist.
- Mukarram Jah, 89, Indian royal, titular Nizam of Hyderabad (since 1967).
- Sven Johansson, 94, Swedish politician, governor of Västerbotten County (1978–1991).
- Andrew Jones, 39, Welsh film director and screenwriter (The Amityville Asylum, Robert, Werewolves of the Third Reich).
- Vakhtang Kikabidze, 84, Georgian singer, actor (Mimino, Don't Grieve) and politician, MP (since 2020), brain cancer.
- Jan Krol, 60, Dutch actor.
- Gordana Kuić, 80, Serbian novelist (The Scent of Rain in the Balkans).
- J. Paul Marion, 95, Canadian politician, Manitoba MLA (1973–1974).
- George McLeod, 92, American basketball player (Baltimore Bullets).
- Lloyd Morrisett, 93, American psychologist and television producer (Sesame Street).
- Mursal Nabizada, 32, Afghan politician, member of the National Assembly (2019–2021), shot.
- Shaye Al-Nafisah, 60, Saudi Arabian footballer (Al-Kawab, national team).
- Gino Odjick, 52, Canadian ice hockey player (Vancouver Canucks, New York Islanders, Montreal Canadiens), heart attack.
- Ruslan Otverchenko, 33, Ukrainian basketball player (BC Budivelnyk, BC Prometey, national team), heart disease.
- Guadalupe Rivera Marín, 98, Mexican lawyer and politician, deputy (1961–1964, 1979–1982) and senator (1984–1988).
- Dilip Sardjoe, 73, Surinamese businessman and politician, chairman of the Basic Party for Renewal and Democracy (2007–2014).
- Lewis Stevens, 86, British politician, MP (1983–1992).
- Gáspár Miklós Tamás, 74, Hungarian columnist (openDemocracy) and politician, MP (1989–1994).
- Jean Veloz, 98, American dancer and actress (Swing Fever, Where Are Your Children?, Jive Junction).
- Yoshimitsu Yamada, 84, Japanese aikido practitioner.

=== 16 ===
- Kamal Aboki, 26, Nigerian comedian, traffic collision.
- Carrie Acheson, 88, Irish politician, TD (1981–1982).
- Lateef Afridi, 79, Pakistani lawyer and politician, president of the Supreme Court Bar Association (2020–2021) and MNA (1997–1999), shot.
- John Bicourt, 77, British Olympic middle-distance runner (1972, 1976).
- Manfred Böcker, 82, German politician, member of the Landtag of North Rhine-Westphalia (1980–2005).
- Mousse Boulanger, 96, Swiss writer and journalist.
- Inna Bychenkova, 81, Ukrainian theater and film artist, Merited Artist of Ukraine.
- Ann Thomas Callahan, 87, Canadian Cree nurse.
- Vladas Česiūnas, 82, Lithuanian sprint canoeist, Olympic champion (1972).
- Jean-Claude Coquet, 94, French linguist and semiotician.
- Tom Corcoran, 79, American novelist and photographer, cancer.
- Pierre Danos, 93, French rugby union player (RC Toulonnais, AS Béziers Hérault, national team).
- Mansour el-Essawy, 85, Egyptian politician, minister of interior (2011).
- Alan Glass, 90, Canadian artist.
- Guo Hong'an, 79, Chinese translator.
- Bjarne Hansen, 93, Norwegian footballer (Vålerenga, national team).
- Luisa Josefina Hernández, 94, Mexican writer, playwright and translator.
- Jann Hoffmann, 65, Danish darts player.
- Darysabel Isales, 88, Puerto Rican opera singer and actress ("Linda Sara").
- Humphry Knipe, 81, South African-born American sociologist, author, and adult film director.
- Gina Lollobrigida, 95, Italian actress (Bread, Love and Dreams, Come September, The Hunchback of Notre Dame).
- Giorgio Mariuzzo, 83, Italian screenwriter (The House by the Cemetery, The Beyond) and director (Apache Woman).
- Alice McPherson, 96, Canadian-born American physician.
- Jim Molan, 72, Australian general and politician, senator (2017–2019, since 2019), cancer.
- Mats Nordberg, 64, Swedish politician, MP (since 2018).
- Reino Nyyssönen, 87, Finnish tennis player. (death announced on this date)
- Brian Perry, 78, British-born Canadian ice hockey player (Oakland Seals, New York Islanders, Buffalo Sabres).
- Johnny Powers, 84, American rockabilly singer and guitarist.
- Arthur Ravenel Jr., 95, American politician, member of the South Carolina House of Representatives (1953–1959) and twice of the Senate, member of the U.S. House of Representatives (1987–1995).
- John Rubino, 77, Italian-born Australian businessman.
- Jason Saleeby, 74, American geologist.
- Lupe Serrano, 92, Chilean-born American ballerina, complications from Alzheimer's disease.
- Rasul Siddik, 73, American jazz trumpeter.
- Gary Smith, 64, American record producer, cancer.
- Jean-Pierre Swings, 79, American-born Belgian astronomer.
- Frank Thomas, 93, American baseball player (Pittsburgh Pirates, New York Mets, Chicago Cubs).

=== 17 ===
- Cecile Gray Bazelon, 95, American painter.
- Jay Briscoe, 38, American professional wrestler (ROH, CZW, NJPW), traffic collision.
- John Bura, 78, American Ukrainian Greek Catholic hierarch, auxiliary bishop of Philadelphia (2006–2019).
- Van Conner, 55, American bass guitarist (Screaming Trees), pneumonia.
- Teodor Corban, 65, Romanian actor (12:08 East of Bucharest, 4 Months, 3 Weeks and 2 Days, Tales from the Golden Age).
- Jerome R. Cox Jr., 97, American computer scientist and entrepreneur.
- Graham James Davies, 87, Welsh Anglican priest, archdeacon of St Davids (1997–2002).
- Manana Doijashvili, 75, Georgian pianist.
- Leon Dubinsky, 81, Canadian actor (Life Classes, Pit Pony), theatre director and composer ("Rise Again").
- Maria Dworzecka, 81, Polish-American physicist and Holocaust survivor.
- George Ellis, 90, English athlete.
- Bjarne Eltang, 62, Danish Olympic rower (1988).
- Chris Ford, 74, American basketball player and coach (Detroit Pistons, Boston Celtics), NBA champion (1981, 1984, 1986).
- Chon Gallegos, 83, American football player (Oakland Raiders).
- Renée Geyer, 69, Australian singer ("Say I Love You", "Heading in the Right Direction", "Stares and Whispers"), complications from hip surgery.
- William Thomas Hart, 93, American jurist, judge of the U.S. District Court for Northern Illinois (since 1982).
- Heinz-Dieter Hasebrink, 81, German footballer (Rot-Weiss Essen, 1. FC Kaiserslautern, Werder Bremen).
- Marko Janković, 75, Serbian journalist and politician.
- Badara Joof, 65, Gambian politician, vice-president (since 2022).
- Annie Brown Kennedy, 98, American politician.
- Mamoru Kobayashi, 78, Japanese politician, MP (1990–2003).
- Gino Landi, 89, Italian choreographer and television and theatre director.
- Mark Leader, 63, American-Australian basketball player and coach, cancer.
- Dolores R. Leckey, 89, American Roman Catholic administrator.
- Liang Jincai, 95, Chinese aerospace engineer, member of the Chinese Academy of Engineering.
- Joe Martin, 91, Irish footballer (Dundalk).
- Jean-Claude Marty, 79, French rugby league player (FC Lézignan XIII, Racing Club Albi XIII, national team).
- Nicola Molè, 91, Italian lawyer and politician, president of the Province of Terni (1995–1999).
- Komba Mondeh, 56, Sierra Leonean army officer, deputy chairman of the National Provisional Ruling Council (1996). (death announced on this date)
- Namig Nasrullayev, 77, Azerbaijani politician, minister of economy (1996–2001), chairman of the Chamber of Accounts (2001–2007).
- Richard Oesterreicher, 90, Austrian guitarist and conductor.
- Arjan Paans, 53, Dutch journalist, cancer.
- Phil Pister, 84, American fishery biologist.
- Muhammad Prakosa, 62, Indonesian bureaucrat, diplomat, and politician, MP (2009–2021).
- Edward R. Pressman, 79, American film producer (Wall Street, Conan the Barbarian, Badlands).
- Jonathan Raban, 80, British travel writer, critic, and novelist (Soft City, Waxwings, For Love & Money).
- Josep Rahola i d'Espona, 104, Spanish engineer and politician, senator (1979–1986).
- Lucile Randon, 118, French supercentenarian, world's oldest living person (since 2022).
- Cornelius Rogge, 90, Dutch artist.
- Vladimir Rusalov, 83, Russian psychologist and anthropologist.
- Ralph L. Sacco, 65, American neurologist, glioblastoma.
- Margaret J. Safrit, 87, American kinesiologist.
- Rickin Sánchez, Puerto Rican wrestling, boxing and baseball television broadcaster.
- Sandra Seacat, 86, American acting coach (Andrew Garfield, Laura Dern) and actress (Under the Banner of Heaven).
- Edi Shukriu, 72, Kosovan politician, archaeologist, and writer. (death announced on this date)
- Robert Simmonds, 96, Canadian police officer, commissioner of the Royal Canadian Mounted Police (1977–1987).
- Paul Soulikias, 96, Greek-Canadian painter, pneumonia.
- Stanislav Tereba, 85, Czech photojournalist.
- Ferenc Varga, 97, Hungarian sprint canoer, Olympic bronze medallist (1952).
- Donald A. Walker, 88, American economist.
- Pnina Werbner, 78, British social anthropologist, pulmonary embolism.
- Sir Samuel Whitbread, 85, British businessman and public servant.
- Nicola Zamboni, 79, Italian sculptor.
- Martinez Zogo, 51, Cameroonian journalist.

=== 18 ===
- Catalino Arevalo, 97, Filipino priest and theologian.
- Helen Arnold, 95, American politician, member of the Oklahoma House of Representatives (1976–1982).
- Henry Caicedo, 71, Colombian footballer (Independiente Medellín, Deportivo Cali, national team), complications from a stroke.
- Donn Cambern, 93, American film editor (Easy Rider, Romancing the Stone, Ghostbusters II), complications from a fall.
- Per Christiansson, 61, Swedish Olympic cyclist (1984), cancer.
- Herman Coessens, 79, Belgian actor (Ons geluk).
- David Crosby, 81, American Hall of Fame singer (The Byrds, Crosby, Stills, Nash & Young) and songwriter ("Guinnevere"), complications from COVID-19.
- William Frank, 99, Canadian politician, MP (1972–1974).
- Clytus Gottwald, 97, German composer, conductor and musicologist.
- Win Headley, 73, American football player (Montreal Alouettes).
- Robert Hersh, 82, American lawyer.
- Jacques Jarry, 93, French linguist and archeologist.
- Gale D. Jones, 66, American artist.
- Roger Kirk, 92, American diplomat, pneumonia.
- Tanya Leise, American biomathematician.
- Valiulla Maksutov, 68, Russian politician, senator (1996).
- John L. Murray, 79, Irish jurist, chief justice (2004–2011), judge of the Supreme Court (1999–2015) and the European Court of Justice (1992–1999).
- Melitta Muszely, 95, Austrian operatic soprano and voice teacher.
- Jagdish Nehra, 79, Indian politician, Haryana MLA (1982–1987).
- John Williams Ntwali, 43, Rwandan journalist.
- Manuel Esteban Paez Terán, 26, Venezuelan environmental activist, shot.
- Roslyn Pope, 84, American civil rights activist and writer (An Appeal for Human Rights).
- Leopold Potesil, 89, Austrian Olympic boxer (1952, 1956).
- Eileen Ramsay, 82, British author, pneumonia.
- Victor Rasgado, 63, Mexican pianist and composer.
- Bill Relph, 94, Scottish rugby union player (Edinburgh District, national team).
- Peter Scheiber, 87, American musician and audio engineer.
- Ted Schwarzman, 76, Australian footballer (St Kilda).
- Prabhaben Shah, 92, Indian social worker, heart disease.
- Zigi Shipper, 93, Polish Holocaust survivor.
- Charlie Twissell, 90, English Olympic footballer (1956, Plymouth Argyle F.C., York City F.C.).
- Paul Vecchiali, 92, French film director (At the Top of the Stairs, Rosa la rose, fille publique, Once More) and author.
- Marcel Zanini, 99, Turkish-born French jazz musician.
- Hakim Zaripov, 98, Uzbek circus performer, trick rider and horse trainer.
- Marius Zibolis, 48, Lithuanian goalball player, Paralympic silver medallist (2000, 2008).
- Notable Ukrainians killed in the Brovary helicopter crash:
  - Yurii Lubkovych, 33, diplomat
  - Denys Monastyrsky, 42, politician, minister of internal affairs (since 2021) and MP (2019–2021)
  - Yevhen Yenin, 42, politician, deputy minister of internal affairs (since 2021)

=== 19 ===
- Andi Rasdiyanah Amir, 87, Indonesian scholar, rector of the Alauddin Islamic State Institute (1985–1994).
- Abdul Ghani Azhari, 101, Indian Islamic scholar.
- Gilles Beyer, 66, French figure skater and skating coach.
- Jim Bradbury, 85, British historian.
- Bertie Cunningham, 81, Irish Gaelic footballer (Meath).
- Kuldip Singh Dhillon, 72, Indian-British property developer and polo player.
- Carin Goldberg, 69, American graphic designer, glioblastoma.
- Claude Guillon, 70, French writer and philosopher.
- Nadir Latif İslam, 92–93, Turkish lawyer and politician, MP (1973–1977).
- Walter Jiménez, 83, Argentine footballer (Independiente, Colo-Colo, national team).
- Isuf Kalo, 80, Albanian physician.
- Frank Lange, 88, German Olympic bobsledder (1968).
- Jean-Claude Lemagny, 91, French library curator and photography historian.
- Tanja Linderborg, 79, Swedish politician, MP (1994–2002).
- Imre Mécs, 89, Hungarian politician, MP (1990–2010).
- Oladipo Ogunlesi, 99, Nigerian professor of medicine.
- Bert Peña, 63, Puerto Rican baseball player (Houston Astros), esophageal cancer.
- Sumitra Peries, 88, Sri Lankan film director (Gehenu Lamai, Ganga Addara, Yahaluvo).
- Nilmani Phookan Jr, 89, Indian poet.
- Andrey Popov, 59, Russian politician, MP (1993–1995).
- George Rose, 81, American football player (Minnesota Vikings, New Orleans Saints).
- Norbert Sattler, 71, Austrian slalom canoeist, Olympic silver medallist (1972).
- Volodymyr Shcherbyna, 87, Ukrainian mathematician and politician, people's deputy (1990–1994).
- Ginger Stanley, 91, American model, actress and stunt woman (Creature from the Black Lagoon, Jupiter's Darling, Revenge of the Creature).
- Betty Lee Sung, 98, American activist, author and academic.
- David Sutherland, 89, Scottish illustrator and comics artist (The Beano, Dennis the Menace and Gnasher, The Bash Street Kids).
- Aranka Szentpétery, 89, Slovak actress.
- Peter Thomas, 78, English-Irish footballer (Waterford, Ireland national team).
- John Towner, 89, Australian footballer (Essendon, West Perth).
- Jos Van Riel, 79, Belgian footballer (Antwerp).
- Anton Walkes, 25, English footballer (Portsmouth, Atlanta United, Charlotte FC), boat collision.
- Illya Woloshyn, 44, Canadian actor (The Odyssey).
- Yoon Jeong-hee, 78, South Korean actress (Poetry, The Three-Day Reign, Oyster Village), complications from Alzheimer's disease.

=== 20 ===
- Xavier Albó, 88, Spanish Jesuit priest, linguist and anthropologist.
- Sal Bando, 78, American Hall of Fame baseball player (Arizona State Sun Devils, Kansas City/Oakland Athletics, Milwaukee Brewers), World Series champion (1972, 1973, 1974), cancer.
- Tim Barlow, 87, English actor (Derek, Les Misérables, Hot Fuzz).
- Ted Bell, 76, American novelist, intracerebral hemorrhage.
- Tom Birmingham, 73, American politician, member (1991–2002) and president (1996–2002) of the Massachusetts Senate.
- Jerry Blavat, 82, American DJ and radio presenter, complications from myasthenia gravis.
- Stella Chiweshe, 76, Zimbabwean mbira player.
- John Clifton, 92, British medical physicist.
- James R. Eddy, 91, American politician, member of the Florida House of Representatives (1963–1968), leukemia.
- Albin Eser, 87, German jurist, director of the Max Planck Institute for Foreign and International Criminal Law (1991–1994).
- Fang Zhiyuan, 83, Chinese engineer, member of the Chinese Academy of Engineering.
- Roy Garden, 61, Zimbabwean lawn bowler.
- Olivia Geerolf, 72, Belgian choreographer.
- Peter Gierasch, 82, American astronomer.
- Julien Goekint, 93, Belgian politician, mayor of Ostend (1980–1997).
- Loïc Guguen, 50, French dramatic baritone.
- Harunata, 69, Indonesian bureaucrat and politician, regent of Lahat (1998–2008).
- He Haoju, 100, Chinese politician, deputy (1983–1998).
- Pierce Higgins, 45, Irish hurler (Tooreen, Ballyhaunis, Mayo county), complications from motor neurone disease.
- Grigorijus Kanovičius, 93, Lithuanian writer.
- Hans Kasper, 84, German politician, member of the Landtag of Saarland (1970–1999).
- Gwen Knapp, 61, American sports journalist (The Philadelphia Inquirer, San Francisco Chronicle, The New York Times), lymphoma.
- Paul La Farge, 52, American novelist, essayist and academic, cancer.
- Chris Leitch, 69, New Zealand politician, leader of the Social Credit Party (since 2018), cancer.
- Jiří Macháně, 82, Czech cinematographer (Beauty and the Beast, The Ninth Heart, Černí baroni).
- Michael Moussa Adamo, 62, Gabonese politician, minister of foreign affairs (since 2022), heart attack.
- Marvin Nash, 69, Jamaican-born Canadian Olympic sprinter (1976).
- Michaela Paetsch, 61, American violinist, cancer.
- Oleh Petrov, 62, Ukrainian politician, MP (1998–2006).
- Nano Riantiarno, 73, Indonesian playwright.
- Taufikurrahman Saleh, 73, Indonesian politician, member of the People's Representative Council (1999–2009).
- Richard Steadman, 85, American surgeon.
- Howard M. Tesher, 90, American Thoroughbred horse racing trainer.
- Nick Todd, 87, American pop singer.
- Sandra Trehub, 84, Canadian psychologist.
- Tom Villa, 77, American politician, member of the Missouri House of Representatives (1974–1984, 2000–2008).

=== 21 ===
- Erricos Andreou, 84, Greek film director (The Hook, Act of Reprisal) and screenwriter.
- Harjit Singh Arora, 61, Indian Air Force officer, vice chief of the air staff (2019–2021).
- Gaetano Azzolina, 91, Italian doctor and politician, deputy (1990–1992).
- B.G., the Prince of Rap, 57, American rapper and Eurodance artist ("The Colour of My Dreams", "Can We Get Enough?").
- Georges Banu, 79, Romanian-born French writer.
- Ritt Bjerregaard, 81, Danish politician, lord mayor of Copenhagen (2006–2009) and minister of education (1973, 1975–1979).
- Gabriel Dodo Ndoke, 51, Cameroonian politician, minister of mines, industries and technological development (since 2019).
- Simon Dunn, 35, Australian bobsledder and amateur rugby player.
- David Howard, 104, Canadian Olympic sailor (1956).
- Susi Hyldgaard, 59, Danish jazz singer and composer, brain tumor.
- Alhaji M.N.D Jawula, 73, Ghanaian football administrator, president of the Ghana Football Association (1997–2000).
- Linda Kasabian, 73, American cult member (Manson Family).
- Inge Kaul, 78, German economist.
- Vuyokazi Ketabahle, 49, South African politician, member of the National Assembly of South Africa (2015–2018), stroke.
- René Laurin, 82, Canadian politician, MP (1993–2000).
- Micheál Mac Gréil, 91, Irish Jesuit priest, sociologist and author.
- Thulani Maseko, 52, Swazi human rights activist, shot.
- Peter Millar, 67, British journalist, stroke.
- Tom Nairn, 90, Scottish political theorist, fall.
- Gary Pettigrew, 78, American football player (Philadelphia Eagles, New York Giants), myelodysplastic syndrome.
- Marek Plura, 52, Polish politician and psychotherapist, MEP (2014–2019), complications from spinal muscular atrophy.
- Renée Radell, 93, American painter.
- Jullebee Ranara, 34, Filipino overseas worker. (body discovered on this date)
- Pino Roveredo, 68, Italian writer and theater director.
- Kurt Schneider, 90, Austrian racing cyclist.
- Bill Schonely, 93, American sports broadcaster (Portland Trail Blazers).
- Krishna Shenoy, 54, American neuroscientist, pancreatic cancer.
- Heino Sisask, 94, Estonian racewalker and sports administrator, chairman of the Estonian Gymnastics Federation (1984–1995).
- Włodzimierz Sroka, 55, Polish economist and manager.
- Stephanie Subercaseaux, 38, Chilean racing cyclist, suicide.
- Ravipudi Venkatadri, 100, Indian philosopher.
- Friedrich Weissensteiner, 95, Austrian historian and writer.
- Dan Willard, American computer scientist.
- Gabrielle Williams, 59, Australian author, stroke.

=== 22 ===
- Sabir Ali, 67, Indian decathlete, cardiac arrest.
- Byram D. Avari, 81, Pakistani hotelier and sailor, owner of Avari Hotels.
- Ian Black, 69, British journalist (The Guardian), and author (Israel's Secret Wars), complications from frontotemporal lobar degeneration.
- Easley Blackwood Jr., 89, American composer (Twelve Microtonal Etudes for Electronic Music Media), pianist, and professor.
- Lin Brehmer, 68, American disc jockey and radio personality (WXRT), prostate cancer.
- Lady Martha Bruce, 101, British aristocrat, prison governor and army officer.
- Matthew H. Clark, 85, American Roman Catholic prelate, bishop of Rochester (1979–2012).
- Gianfranco Goberti, 83, Italian painter.
- John E. Gordon, 81, American rear admiral.
- Leopoldo Guerra, 68, Guatemalan public official and lawyer.
- David Hains, 92, Australian businessman and horse breeder.
- Thomas Hellberg, 81, Swedish actor (Rederiet).
- Darío Jara Saguier, 92, Paraguayan footballer (Rubio Ñu, Cerro Porteño, national team).
- Vaughan Johnson, 75, Australian politician, Queensland MLA (1989–2015).
- Octaviano Juarez-Corro, 49, Mexican-American fugitive (FBI Ten Most Wanted).
- Masaru Konuma, 85, Japanese film director (Flower and Snake, Tattooed Flower Vase, Cloistered Nun: Runa's Confession), pneumonia.
- Marianne Mantell, 93, German-born American writer and audiobook executive, co-founder of Caedmon Audio.
- Seyed Abolhassan Mokhtabad, 53, Iranian journalist, heart attack.
- Lenie de Nijs, 83, Dutch swimmer, European champion (1958).
- Sal Piro, 72, American fan club president (The Rocky Horror Picture Show) and author (Creatures of the Night), aneurysm.
- Zhanna Pliyeva, 73, Georgian composer and pianist.
- Siddheshwar Prasad, 94, Indian politician, governor of Tripura (1995–2000) and MP (1962–1977).
- Mario Pupella, 77, Italian actor (Angela, Salvo, Padrenostro) and theater director.
- Hossein Shahabi, 55, Iranian film director (For the Sake of Mahdi, The Sale, The Bright Day) and screenwriter, lung infection.
- Bernd Uhl, 76, German Roman Catholic prelate, auxiliary bishop of Freiburg (2001–2018).
- Agustí Villaronga, 69, Spanish film director (In a Glass Cage, Moon Child, Black Bread), screenwriter and actor.
- Sam Bass Warner Jr., 94, American historian.
- Nikos Xanthopoulos, 88, Greek actor and singer, heart disease.

=== 23 ===
- Abd Rani Osman, 64, Malaysian politician, Selangor State MLA (2008–2018), heart disease.
- Joseph Agassi, 95, Israeli philosopher and author.
- Pamela Kirkham, 16th Baroness Berners, 93, British hereditary peer, member of the House of Lords (1995–1999), stroke.
- Patrizio Billio, 48, Italian footballer (Crystal Palace, Ancona, Dundee), heart attack.
- Milton Bradley, 88, British racehorse trainer.
- Álvaro Colom, 71, Guatemalan engineer, businessman and politician, president (2008–2012), cancer and pulmonary emphysema.
- George Crabtree, 78, American physicist.
- Paul A. David, 87, American economist and academic.
- Jozef Dravecký, 75, Slovak diplomat, ambassador to Bulgaria (1993–1998), Latvia and Lithuania (2000–2005), and the Holy See (2007–2013).
- Franklin Delano Floyd, 79, American murderer and rapist.
- Stan Franklin, 91, American scientist (Artificial Minds).
- Patricia Liggins Hill, 80, American academic and anthologist (Call and Response: The Riverside Anthology of the African American Literary Tradition).
- Hu Guangzhen, 95, Chinese electronic engineer, member of the Chinese Academy of Engineering.
- Hiromitsu Kadota, 74, Japanese Hall of Fame baseball player (Nankai Hawks, Orix Braves).
- Dolores Kondrashova, 86, Russian hairdresser.
- Kweon Kab-yong, 65, South Korean Go player.
- Serge Laget, 63, French board game designer (Mare Nostrum, Mystery of the Abbey).
- William Lawvere, 85, American mathematician.
- Fred Lindop, 84, British rugby league referee.
- Mary Niles Maack, 77, American librarian and historian, cancer.
- Edrissa Marong, 27, Gambian long-distance runner.
- Eugenio Martín, 97, Spanish film director (Bad Man's River, The Ugly Ones, Horror Express) and screenwriter.
- Stuart Murray, 89, Scottish golfer.
- Victor Navasky, 90, American journalist (The Nation, Monocle, The New York Times Magazine).
- Polo Polo, 78, Mexican comedian.
- Everett Quinton, 71, American actor (Natural Born Killers, Pollock, Bros), glioblastoma.
- E. Ramdoss, 66, Indian film director, screenwriter (Aayiram Pookkal Malarattum, Ravanan) and actor, heart attack.
- Sami Sharaf, 93, Egyptian military officer.
- Carol Sloane, 85, American jazz singer, complications from a stroke.
- Top Topham, 75, English guitarist (The Yardbirds).
- Valeri Urin, 88, Russian football player (Dynamo Moscow, Daugava Riga, Soviet Union national team) and manager.
- Sudheer Varma, 34, actor (Neeku Naaku Dash Dash, Second Hand, Kundanapu Bomma), suicide.
- Harald de Vlaming, 68, Dutch Olympic sailor (1976).
- Roland Weller, 84, French businessman, president of RC Strasbourg Alsace (1994–1997).

=== 24 ===
- Oladejo Victor Akinlonu, 59, Nigerian artist.
- Zaza Aleksidze, 87, Georgian historian and linguist.
- Jean Anderson, 93, American cookbook author.
- Benito Bollati, 96, Italian lawyer and politician, deputy (1974–1979).
- Edward C. Chalfant, 85, American Episcopalian clergyman, bishop of Maine (1986–1996).
- Raymond Cross, 74, American attorney, complications from a spinal tumor.
- B. V. Doshi, 95, Indian architect (CEPT University, Tagore Memorial Hall, Indian Institute of Management Bangalore), Pritzker Prize winner (2018).
- Christelle Doumergue, 59, French basketball player (Clermont UC, Tango Bourges Basket, national team).
- Mounir Jelili, 73, Tunisian Olympic handball player (1972, 1976).
- Lance Kerwin, 62, American actor (James at 15, The Loneliest Runner, Salem's Lot).
- Ole Didrik Lærum, 82, Norwegian oncologist and academic administrator, rector of the University of Bergen (1990–1995).
- Mary Despina Lekas, 94, American physician.
- Mira Lehr, 88, American artist.
- Li Zhao, 82, Chinese landmine expert, member of the Chinese Academy of Engineering.
- George Magoha, 70, Kenyan surgeon and academic administrator, vice chancellor of the University of Nairobi (2005–2015) and minister of education (since 2019), cardiac arrest.
- Frank Mestnik, 84, American football player (St. Louis Cardinals, Green Bay Packers).
- Mònica Miquel Serdà, 60, Spanish politician, deputy (2003–2004).
- Panteleimon, 87, Greek Orthodox prelate, metropolitan of Belgium and exarchate of the Netherlands and Luxembourg (1982–2013).
- Jackson Rohm, 51, American singer-songwriter.

=== 25 ===
- Wolfgang Altenburg, 94, German general, inspector general of the Bundeswehr (1983–1986) and chairman of the NATO Military Committee (1986–1989).
- Taijirō Amazawa, 86, Japanese poet and scholar.
- Khadija Assad, 70–71, Moroccan actress, cancer.
- Noah Cowan, 55, Canadian artistic director (TIFF Bell Lightbox, SFFILM), glioblastoma.
- Maria Deroche, 84, Brazilian-born French architect.
- Norman Dilworth, 92, British artist.
- James Edmonds, 84, American Olympic rower (1964).
- Shimon Elituv, 85, Israeli Orthodox rabbi.
- David Ewins, 80, British mechanical engineer.
- Hugh Fletcher, 89, Scottish footballer (Carlisle United, Celtic).
- Pamela Anne Gordon, 79, Canadian model.
- Titewhai Harawira, 90, New Zealand Māori activist.
- Franciszek Jamroż, 79, Polish trade unionist and politician, mayor of Gdańsk (1991–1994).
- Shantabai Kamble, 99, Indian writer.
- Roger Louret, 72, French actor, playwright, and theatre director.
- Jimmie Massie, 64, American politician.
- Bernhard T. Mittemeyer, 92, American lieutenant general, surgeon general of the U.S. Army (1981–1985).
- José Reis Pereira, 79, Brazilian politician, Piauí MLA (1987–1991).
- Duncan Pugh, 48, Australian Olympic bobsledder (2010), brain aneurysm.
- Willie Richardson, 74, American civil rights activist.
- Barbara Stanley, 73, American psychologist, ovarian cancer.
- Peter Stead, 92, English cricketer (Canadian national team).
- Bilal al-Sudani, Somali terrorist.
- Miki Takai, 55, Japanese journalist.
- José Javier Viñes Rueda, 85, Spanish politician, senator (1989–1993), member of the Navarrese parliament (1983–1991, 1999–2003).
- Cindy Williams, 75, American actress (Laverne & Shirley, American Graffiti, The Conversation).
- John Gordon Williamson, 86, English cricketer (Northamptonshire, Durham, Cheshire).
- Bob Young, 83, American college football coach (Sioux Falls Cougars).

=== 26 ===
- Dave Albright, 63, American football player (Saskatchewan Roughriders), heart attack.
- Rodolfo Ares, 68, Spanish politician, member of the Basque Parliament (1994–2009, 2012–2016).
- Pat Ashworth, 92-93, British nursing sister.
- Sayyid Ghulam Hussain Shah Bukhari, 90, Pakistani Islamic scholar.
- Dean Daughtry, 76, American keyboard player (The Candymen, Classics IV, Atlanta Rhythm Section).
- Sepp Dürr, 69, German politician, member of the Landtag of Bavaria (1998–2018), cancer.
- Diana Fisher, 91, Australian television personality (The Inventors, Beauty and the Beast) and commentator, non-Hodgkin lymphoma.
- Fiona Graham, 61, Australian anthropologist and geisha.
- Zdeňka Hradilová, 84, Czech Olympic sprint canoer (1964).
- Helene L. Kaplan, 89, American lawyer.
- Nicholas Kepros, 90, American actor (Amadeus, Quiz Show, The Associate).
- Attilio Labis, 86, French ballet dancer and teacher.
- Jessie Lemonier, 25, American football player (Los Angeles Chargers, Detroit Lions).
- Eduard Lobau, 34, Belarusian political activist, shot.
- Peter McCann, 74, American songwriter ("Do You Wanna Make Love", "Right Time of the Night") and musician.
- Billy Packer, 82, American sports broadcaster and analyst (ACC, NCAA Final Four), kidney failure.
- Gary Peters, 85, American baseball player (Chicago White Sox, Boston Red Sox).
- Peter G. J. Pulzer, 93, Austrian-born British historian.
- Judo Rathnam, 92, Indian stuntman (Thamarai Kulam, Vallavan Oruvan, Thalai Nagaram).
- Harry Raven, 86, Australian rugby footballer.
- Allan Ryan, 77, American attorney, heart attack.
- Abdul Jabar Sabet, 78, Afghan politician, attorney general (2006–2008).
- Edgar Schein, 94, Swiss-born American business theorist and psychologist.
- Irvine Shillingford, 78, Dominican cricketer (West Indies, Combined Islands, Windward Islands).
- Dmitri Shkidchenko, Ukrainian figure skater and coach.
- Mesir Suryadi, 79, Indonesian politician, member of the People's Representative Council (2004–2009).
- Keith Thomson, 81, New Zealand Olympic field hockey player (1968), and cricketer (Canterbury, national team).
- Võ Văn Ái, 87, Vietnamese poet, journalist and human-rights activist.
- Wang Wei, 85, Chinese physicist, member of the Chinese Academy of Sciences.
- Alice Wolf, 89, Austrian-born American politician, member of the Massachusetts House of Representatives (1996–2013), leukemia.

=== 27 ===
- Albert Almanza, 86, Mexican Olympic basketball player (1960, 1964).
- Raimo Aulis Anttila, 87, Finnish linguist.
- Anthony Arlidge, 85, British barrister and judge.
- Daniel Boone, 80, English pop musician ("Beautiful Sunday").
- Bob Chrystal, 92, Canadian ice hockey player (New York Rangers).
- Marcia G. Cooke, 68, American jurist, judge of the U.S. District Court for Southern Florida (since 2004).
- Robert Dalva, 80, American film editor (The Black Stallion, Captain America: The First Avenger, Jumanji), lymphoma.
- Gerard Escoda, 50, Spanish footballer (Reus, Villarreal) and sporting director (CE Sabadell), cancer.
- Pietro Forquet, 97, Italian bridge player.
- R. Kent Greenawalt, 86, American academic.
- Gregory Allen Howard, 70, American screenwriter and film producer (Remember the Titans, Ali, Harriet), heart failure.
- Shahidul Islam, 65, Bangladeshi politician, MP (2002–2006), complications from diabetes.
- Jamuna, 86, Indian actress (Milan, Pandanti Kapuram) and politician, MP (1989–1991).
- Helena Jungwirth, 77, Swedish operatic mezzo-soprano.
- Gulmira Karimova, 45, Kazakh politician, senator (since 2023).
- Aleksander Krawczuk, 100, Polish historian and politician, minister of culture (1986–1989) and MP (1991–1997).
- Alfred Leslie, 95, American painter and film director (Pull My Daisy), COVID-19.
- Li Wenjun, 92, Chinese translator.
- Emmie Lucassen-Reynders, 87, Dutch chemist.
- Mikhail Mustygin, 85, Belarusian footballer (Avangard-Kortek, CSK MO, Dinamo Minsk).
- Srinivasa Murthy, Indian dubbing artist, cardiac arrest.
- Michiko Nagai, 97, Japanese historical fiction writer.
- Albert Okura, 71, American businessman, founder of Juan Pollo, sepsis.
- Saša Petrović, 61, Bosnian-Serbian actor (It's Hard to Be Nice, Fuse, Lud, zbunjen, normalan).
- Ghislaine Pierie, 53, Dutch actress, film director, and stage director (Baantjer, Moordvrouw, SpangaS).
- Martin Purtscher, 94, Austrian politician, governor of Vorarlberg (1987–1997).
- Alexander Pushnitsa, 73, Russian sambo practitioner, cancer.
- William J. Riley, 75, American jurist, judge of the U.S. Court of Appeals for the Eighth Circuit (since 2001).
- David Rimmer, 81, Canadian avant-garde filmmaker, and educator.
- Malcolm Robbins, 62, American serial killer and rapist.
- Floyd Sneed, 80, Canadian drummer (Three Dog Night).
- Sylvia Syms, 89, English actress (At Home with the Braithwaites, The Queen, Ice Cold in Alex).
- Ting Chiang, 86, Taiwanese actor (Four Loves, The Bold, the Corrupt, and the Beautiful, All in 700) and film director.
- Isaac Trachtenberg, 99, Ukrainian toxicologist, member of the National Academy of Sciences of Ukraine.
- Donald Trelford, 85, British journalist, editor of The Observer (1975–1993), cancer.
- Derek Tulk, 88, English cricketer (Hampshire).
- Yang Yi, 103, Chinese literary translator.

=== 28 ===
- Amru Daulay, 83, Indonesian politician, regent of Mandailing Natal (2000–2010).
- Hilda Bettermann, 80, American politician, member of the Minnesota House of Representatives (1991–1999).
- Jacques Bloch, 98, French resistance fighter.
- Odd Børre, 83, Norwegian pop singer (Eurovision Song Contest 1968).
- Gérard Caillaud, 76, French actor (The Accuser, L'argent des autres, The Dogs) and stage director.
- Phil Coles, 91, Australian sports administrator and Olympic sprint canoeist (1960, 1964, 1968).
- Garth Everett, 69, American politician, member of the Pennsylvania House of Representatives (2007–2020), cancer.
- Hussain Rabi Gandhi, 74, Indian writer and political activist.
- Jane F. Gardner, 88, British historian and academic.
- Anne Haug, 101, Norwegian politician.
- Max Huwyler, 91, Swiss writer.
- Stefan Kjernholm, 71, Swedish Olympic luger (1976, 1980).
- Krister Kristensson, 80, Swedish footballer (Malmö, Trelleborg, national team).
- Eva Kushner, 93, Canadian academic.
- Viola Léger, 92, Canadian actress (Jerome's Secret) and politician, senator (2001–2005).
- Kent Lockhart, 59, American-born Australian basketball player (Eastside Spectres, Albany Patroons).
- Lisa Loring, 64, American actress (The Addams Family, Blood Frenzy, As the World Turns), stroke.
- Paulo Roberto de Souza Matos, 78, Brazilian politician, deputy (1987–1991).
- Evgeny Mogilevsky, 77, Russian pianist.
- Adama Niane, 56, French actor (Baise-moi, Get In, Lupin).
- Landon Pearson, 92, Canadian author and politician, senator (1994–2005).
- Dan Ramos, 41, American politician, member of the Ohio House of Representatives (2011–2019).
- Xavier Rubert de Ventós, 83, Spanish politician, philosopher, and writer, deputy (1982–1986) and MEP (1986–1994).
- Harold Rusland, 84, Surinamese politician, minister of education (1980–1983).
- Jaroslav Šedivý, 93, Czech politician, minister of foreign affairs (1997–1998).
- Jiří Šetlík, 93, Czech art historian and academic.
- Paul Stevenson, 82, English major general.
- Barrett Strong, 81, American singer ("Money (That's What I Want)") and songwriter ("I Heard It Through the Grapevine", "Papa Was a Rollin' Stone").
- Carlo Tavecchio, 79, Italian football executive, president of the FIGC (2014–2017), lung disease.
- Tom Verlaine, 73, American musician (Television), songwriter ("Marquee Moon") and producer (Sketches for My Sweetheart the Drunk).
- Hershell West, 82, American basketball player (Syracuse Nationals) and coach.
- Robert J. Winglass, 87, American lieutenant general and politician, member of the Maine House of Representatives (1995–1998).
- Vasily Zakharyashchev, 77, Russian politician, deputy (2007–2011).

=== 29 ===
- George Beven, 93, Sri Lankan-British artist.
- Bob Born, 98, American businessman (Peeps, Hot Tamales).
- Vito Chimenti, 69, Italian football player (Matera, Palermo, Taranto) and manager, heart attack.
- Naba Das, 61, Indian politician, member of the Odisha Legislative Assembly (since 2009), shot.
- Adriana Dias, 52, Brazilian anthropologist and activist, brain cancer.
- John Devine, 82, Australian football player and coach (Geelong, North Hobart).
- Vadym Dobizha, 81, Ukrainian football manager (Zorya Luhansk, JK Sillamäe Kalev).
- Ross Gillespie, 87, New Zealand Olympic field hockey player (1960, 1964) and two-time Olympic coach.
- Gopal Sri Ram, 79, Malaysian jurist, judge of the Federal Court (2009–2010), lung infection.
- Sitiveni Halapua, 73, Tongan politician, MP (2010–2014).
- Brandon Jackson, 88, British Anglican priest, dean of Lincoln (1989–1997).
- Barrie Juniper, 90, British plant scientist and author (The Carnivorous Plants).
- Masood Sharif Khan Khattak, 72, Pakistani intelligence officer, director-general of the Intelligence Bureau (1993–1996).
- Michael Krebs, 66, American actor (Field of Lost Shoes).
- Vatti Vasant Kumar, 67, Indian politician, Andhra Pradesh MLA (2004–2014).
- Heddy Lester, 72, Dutch singer and actress.
- Hazel McCallion, 101, Canadian politician, mayor of Mississauga (1978–2014), pancreatic cancer.
- Gerhard Moehring, 101, German teacher and local historian.
- Henry Moore, 88, American football player (New York Giants, Baltimore Colts).
- John D. Morris, 76, American young earth creationist.
- Bernard A. Newcomb, 79, American businessman, co-founder of E-Trade.
- Simon Ifede Ogouma, 89, Beninese politician, minister of foreign affairs (1980–1982).
- Dmytro Pavlychko, 93, Ukrainian poet, translator and diplomat, ambassador to Slovakia (1995–1998) and Poland (1999–2002).
- George R. Robertson, 89, Canadian actor (Police Academy, E.N.G., JFK).
- Gordon Rohlehr, 80, Guyanese academic.
- Mandeep Roy, 73, Indian actor (Minchina Ota, Baadada Hoo, Benkiya Bale), cardiac arrest.
- Roger Schank, 76, American artificial intelligence theorist.
- Kyle Smaine, 31, American freestyle skier, avalanche.
- Will Steffen, 75, American-born Australian climatologist and chemist, pancreatic cancer.
- Grant Stoelwinder, 52, Australian swimmer and coach.
- Gero Storjohann, 64, German politician, MP (since 2002), member of the Landtag of Schleswig-Holstein (1994–2002).
- Leif Svanström, 79, Swedish doctor.
- Gabriel Tacchino, 88, French classical pianist.
- Sidney Thornton, 68, American football player (Pittsburgh Steelers).
- Piotr Waśko, 61, Polish politician, MP (2007–2011).
- Annie Wersching, 45, American actress (24, The Last of Us, Runaways), cancer.
- Graham Winteringham, 99, English architect (Crescent Theatre).
- Gerhard Woitzik, 95, German politician, chairman of the Centre Party (1974–1986, 1996–2009, 2011–2021).

=== 30 ===
- John Adams, 71, American baseball superfan (Cleveland Indians/Guardians) and drummer.
- Viktor Ageyev, 86, Russian water polo player, Olympic silver medallist (1960).
- Jesús Aguilar Padilla, 70, Mexican politician, governor of Sinaloa (2005–2010).
- Alben W. Barkley II, 78, American politician.
- Bobby Beathard, 86, American Hall of Fame football executive (Miami Dolphins, Washington Redskins, San Diego Chargers), complications from Alzheimer's disease.
- Pat Bunch, 83, American country music songwriter ("I'll Still Be Loving You", "Wild One", "Living in a Moment").
- Fernando Elboj Broto, 76, Spanish teacher and politician, senator (1982–1989, 2008–2011).
- Andrew Grimwade, 92, Australian chemical engineer and scientist.
- Ryszard Gryglewski, 90, Polish pharmacologist and physician.
- Ann Harding, 64, Australian economist.
- Sir Michael Heller, 86, British mining executive, chairman of Bisichi Mining and London & Associated Properties.
- Donald M. Hess, 86, Swiss winemaker and art collector.
- Bobby Hull, 84, Canadian Hall of Fame ice hockey player (Chicago Blackhawks, Winnipeg Jets, Hartford Whalers), Stanley Cup champion (1961).
- John Bailey Jones, 95, American jurist and politician, judge of the U.S. District Court for South Dakota (since 1981) and member of the South Dakota House of Representatives (1956–1960).
- Matthew Klein, 89, American politician.
- László Kordás, 53, Hungarian trade unionist and politician, MP (since 2022), heart attack.
- Li Jieshou, 98, Chinese surgeon and engineer.
- Ann McLaughlin Korologos, 81, American politician, secretary of labor (1987–1989), complications from meningitis.
- Charly Loubet, 77, French footballer (Cannes, Nice, national team).
- Celeste McCollough, 96, American psychologist (McCollough effect).
- Gerald Mortag, 64, German cyclist, Olympic silver medallist (1980).
- Ouyang Pingkai, 77, Chinese engineer and academic administrator, president of Nanjing Tech University (2001–2012) and member of the Chinese Academy of Engineering.
- Linda Pastan, 90, American poet, cancer.
- Shamsul Alam Pramanik, 70, Bangladeshi politician, MP (1996–2008), complications from diabetes.
- Alexis Ravelo, 51, Spanish writer.
- Mike Schrunk, 80, American district attorney, complications from Alzheimer's disease.
- Albert Schweitzer, 101, American newspaper cartoonist (St. Louis Post-Dispatch).
- Félix Sienra, 107, Uruguayan Olympic sailor (1948).
- Charles Silverstein, 87, American writer (The Joy of Gay Sex), therapist and gay activist.
- Pedo Terlaje, 76, American politician, member of the Legislature of Guam (since 2019).
- James Alexander Thom, 89, American author.
- Ting Pang-hsin, 86, Chinese linguist.
- K. V. Tirumalesh, 82, Indian writer and poet.
- Diana Tomkinson, 79, British Olympic alpine skier (1968).
- Jeff Vlaming, 63, American television writer and producer (The X-Files, Hannibal, The 100), cancer.
- Teddy Joseph Von Nukem, 35, American white supremacist, suicide by gunshot.

=== 31 ===
- Tiba al-Ali, 22, Iraqi-born Turkish social media personality, strangulation.
- Louis-Charles Bary, 96, French trade unionist and politician, mayor of Neuilly-sur-Seine (2002–2008).
- Cleonice Berardinelli, 106, Brazilian writer, member of the Academia Brasileira de Letras.
- Shanti Bhushan, 97, Indian lawyer and politician, minister of law and justice (1977–1979).
- Jacques Brassinne de La Buissière, 93, Belgian political scientist.
- Cleve Bryant, 75, American college football player (Ohio Bobcats) and coach (Illinois Fighting Illini, Texas Longhorns).
- Lou Campanelli, 84, American basketball coach (James Madison Dukes, California Golden Bears).
- Anna Czerwińska, 73, Polish mountaineer.
- Errol Dixon, 86, Jamaican blues singer and pianist.
- Joyce Dopkeen, 80, American photographer (The New York Times).
- David Durenberger, 88, American politician, member of the U.S. Senate (1978–1995), heart failure.
- Dave Elder, 47, American baseball player (Cleveland Indians), suicide by drug overdose.
- General Transporter, Cameroonian Ambazonian rebel leader.
- Mark S. Golub, 77, American rabbi and media entrepreneur (Jewish Broadcasting Service).
- Jorunn Hageler, 76, Norwegian politician, MP (1993–1997).
- Donie Hanlon, 85, Irish Gaelic footballer (Gracefield, Offaly county).
- Tyler James Hoare, 82, American designer, artist, and sculptor.
- Alan Hurst, 77, British politician, MP (1997–2005).
- Bernd Karwofsky, 77, German Olympic ski jumper (1968).
- Kim Young-hee, 59, South Korean basketball player, Olympic silver medallist (1984), brain cancer.
- Jan Kudra, 85, Polish Olympic cyclist (1964).
- C. Lalitha, 84, Indian Carnatic singer (Bombay Sisters), heart attack.
- Nicole Lattès, 84, French editor.
- Luiz Suzin Marini, 87, Brazilian politician, Santa Catarina MLA (1991–1999).
- Josefina Angélica Meabe, 83, Argentine rancher and politician, senator (2009–2015).
- Willie Milne, 71, Scottish professional golfer, cardiac arrest.
- Joe Moss, 92, American football player (Washington Redskins) and coach (Philadelphia Eagles, Toronto Argonauts).
- Henrik Nordbrandt, 77, Danish poet (Drømmebroer), novelist and essayist.
- Kadriye Nurmambet, 89, Romanian traditional folk singer and folklorist.
- Luigi Pasinetti, 92, Italian economist.
- Ilya São Paulo, 59, Brazilian actor (The Amulet of Ogum, The Third Bank of the River, Amor de Mãe).
- Edmond Roudnitska, 91, French Olympic hurdler (1952, 1956, 1960).
- Egon Schmidt, 91, Hungarian ornithologist and natural historian.
- Dennis Schneider, 80, Canadian politician, member and speaker of the Yukon Legislative Assembly (2000–2002).
- Tom Schoen, 77, American football player (Cleveland Browns).
- Barbara Scofield, 96, American tennis player.
- Eddie Spence, 97, Northern Irish Gaelic footballer (Antrim).
- Charlie Thomas, 85, American Hall of Fame singer (The Drifters), liver cancer.
