= Sven Johansson =

Sven Johansson may refer to:

- Sven Johansson (canoeist) (1912–1953), Swedish sprint canoeist, Olympic winner
- Sven Johansson (cyclist) (1914–1982), Swedish cyclist
- Sven Johansson (politician, born 1916) (1916–1987), Swedish politician
- Sven Johansson (politician, 1928–2023), Swedish politician
- Sven Tumba (1931–2011), Swedish ice hockey player, named Sven Johansson before legally changing his name
- Sven Johansson (sport shooter) (born 1945), Swedish shooter, Olympic medalist
- Sven-Göran Johansson (born 1943), Swedish Olympic swimmer

== See also ==
- Sven-Åke Johansson (born 1943), Swedish drummer and composer
