= Country Boy Eddie =

American country singer and television personality (1930–2023)

- Born: Gordon Edward Burns; December 13, 1930; Warrior, Alabama, U.S.
- Died: January 13, 2023 (aged 92); Warrior, Alabama, U.S.
- Occupation(s): TV and radio host, musician
- Spouse: Edwina Burns
- Relatives: Doyle Edward Burns (son)

Gordon Edward Burns (December 13, 1930 – January 13, 2023), known as Country Boy Eddie, was an American singer, instrumentalist, and radio and television personality.

== Career ==
From 1957 to 1993, he was the host of the Country Boy Eddie Show on WBRC, a variety show which focused on country music. Tammy Wynette had her first major break on the program.

His show was said to have been "...a blend of cowboy and country music and down-home talk and humor". His show became very popular and had high ratings. In the book Lovesick Blues author Paul Hemphill said, "Birmingham would awaken to the sounds of Eddie braying like a mule... and then breaking into a hoedown with his house band".

Burns was considered a local celebrity and made many public appearances.

== Awards and recognition ==
The set for the Country Boy Eddie Show is on display at the Alabama Music Hall of Fame. Eddie was recognized for his contributions by induction in the Birmingham Record Collectors Hall of Fame in 2003. In 2020, to celebrate his 90th birthday, WBRC released a television special called Absolutely Alabama: Country Boy Eddie’s 90th Birthday Celebration.
