= David S. Laustsen =

American politician (1947–2023)

Member of the South Dakota House of Representatives
- In office 1977–1984

Member of the South Dakota Senate
- In office 1985–1987

Personal details
- Born: June 13, 1947 Racine, Wisconsin, U.S.
- Died: January 6, 2023 (aged 75) Doylestown, Pennsylvania, U.S.
- Party: Democratic
- Spouse: Jean Barnum
- Education: Northwestern University

David S. Laustsen (June 13, 1947 – January 6, 2023) was an American politician. He served as a Democratic member of the South Dakota House of Representatives and the South Dakota Senate.

== Life and career ==
Laustsen was born in Racine, Wisconsin. He attended Central High School in Aberdeen, South Dakota and Northwestern University.

In 1977, Laustsen was elected to the South Dakota House of Representatives, serving until 1984. In 1985, he was elected to the South Dakota Senate, resigning in 1987, when he was accepted to attend Temple Law School.

Laustsen died on January 6, 2023, at the age of 75 in Doylestown, Pennsylvania.
