= Edith Lank =

American journalist (1926–2023)

- Born: February 27, 1926; Chelsea, Massachusetts, U.S.
- Died: January 1, 2023 (aged 96); Rochester, New York, U.S.
- Occupations: Author, advice columnist, blogger

Edith Lank (February 27, 1926 – January 1, 2023) was an American author, advice columnist, and blogger who lived in Rochester, New York. She authored or co-authored ten books on real estate and one book on Jane Austen. Her books, including the Home Buyers Kit and Home Sellers kit, provide practical advice for real estate transactions. Her syndicated weekly real estate column appeared in more than 100 newspapers and web sites, and she answered questions sent to AskEdith.com. USA Today dubbed her the Dear Abby of real estate. She appeared on television and public radio.

Lank wrote '86 and Holding', a blog about adventures in aging, with a positive orientation towards the process of growing old.

Lank was an avid Jane Austen collector, with hundreds of editions and related material, including a unique copy of Lord Brabourne's Letters of Jane Austen annotated by family members. She was a board member of the Jane Austen Society of North America and a life member of the British society.

Lank wrote her final House Calls newspaper column at the end of June 2019, retiring from her 40+ year columnist career, at the age of 93.

Lank was born in Chelsea, Massachusetts. Lank died on January 1, 2023, in Rochester at the age of 96.
