= Donald A. Walker =

American economist

Donald Anthony Walker (born March 6 1934, died January 17, 2023) was Emeritus Professor of Economics at Indiana University of Pennsylvania. He was president and founder of the Walras Society, and served as president of the History of Economics Society.

== Early life and education ==
Walker received his M.A. in Economics from the University of Texas (1956), and his Ph.D. in Economics from Harvard University (1961).

== Academic positions ==
After receiving his PhD, Walker taught in Boston and Oxford, Ohio. In 1969, he moved to Indiana University of Pennsylvania (IUP), where he served as professor of economics and chair of the economics department until his retirement in 1998. He specialized in the field of microeconomics. In 1998, he received the Distinguished University Professor Award. After retiring he served as professor emeritus of economics.

He was founder and president of the Walras Society, and president of the History of Economics Society from 1987 until 1988.

The Donald A. Walker Department of Economics Scholarship Fund at IUP is named after him.

== Personal life ==
Walker had one daughter and a grandson with his wife Patricia. He died on January 17, 2023.

== Books ==
- Walras's Market Models, Cambridge University Press, 1996
- Advances In General Equilibrium Theory: The Hennipman Lectures, Edward Elgar Publishing, 1997
- The Legacy of Leon Walras, (Editor) Edward Elgar Publishing, 2001
- Walrasian Economics, Cambridge University Press, July 21, 2011
