= Seyed Abolhassan Mokhtabad =

Iranian journalist (1970–2023)

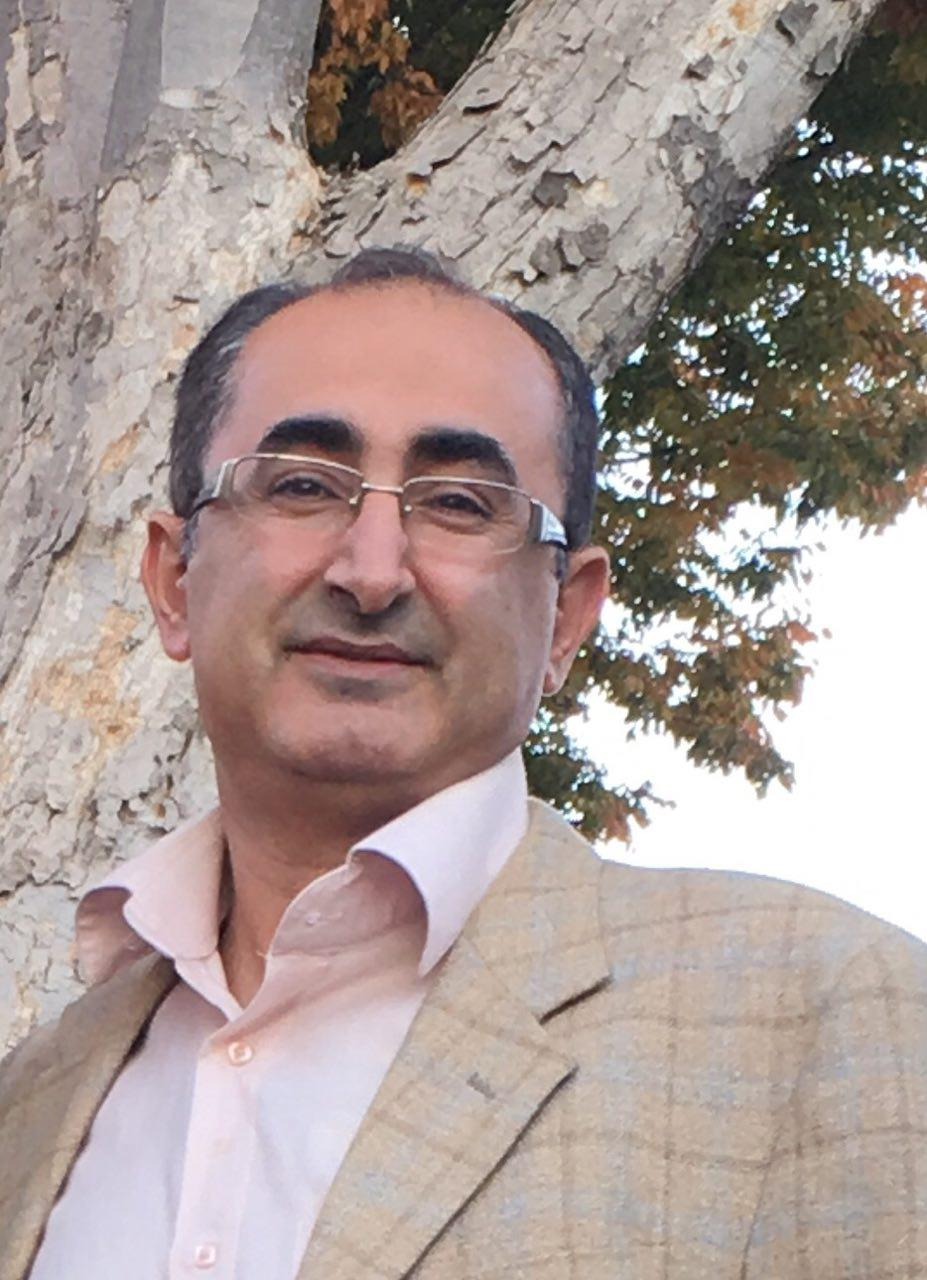
سید ابوالحسن مختاباد

Seyed Abolhassan Mokhtabad (Persian: سید ابوالحسن مختاباد; 11 January 1970 – 22 January 2023) was an Iranian journalist. He was a member of the board of directors of the Association of Iranian Journalists and a member of International Federation of Journalists (IFJ), author and researcher in the field of the Middle East history, music, culture, and arts.

Mokhtabad died from a heart attack on 22 January 2023, at the age of 53.

== Experience ==
2015–2023: Holding educational workshops on regional music of Iran and other nearby states, Islamic Cultural Center of Northern California

2014–2023: Editor Chief in Senses Cultural website in Sacramento

2015–2023: Columnist at Kargadan magazine

2006–2013: Columnist at Etemaad newspaper

Author and researcher for the Persian music program on educational television channel

2011–2023: Columnist at Shargh Newspaper

2011–2023: Columnist at Tajrobeh Magazine

2011–2012: Columnist at Mehrnameh Magazine

2011–2023: Editor–in-chief of the website of the Institute for Children with Autism

2008: Editor–in-chief of the Iranian Journalists Association's Website

Director of "Study of Three Decades of Iran’s Music" at the Iranian Music Association

2008–2023: Columnist at the Elite Weblog of Khabar-online Website

2007–2013: Manager of the Department of Art and Culture of Hamshahrionline

2006–2023: Manager of the Dispute Resolution Committee of the Iranian Journalists Association

2006–2007: Director of the Department of Art and Literature of Kargozaran Newspaper

2005–2012: Worked with Iranian National TV channels 2 and 4

2005–2011: Columnist and writer at Shargh newspaper

2002–2005: Editor of Iran’s House of Music Publications

2001–2005: Editor of the Weekly Bulletin of Weekly Book

1998–1999: Head of the thought group of Sobhe-Emrouz and Aftabe-Emroz Newspaper

1996–2005: Director of Department of Art and Literature of weekly Magazine of Atiyeh

1994–2010: Journalist and news-writer at Hamshahri newspaper

2010–2015: Professional director of Persian music programming on the educational television of Tehran.

2010–2011: Jury 1st and 2nd Festival of Music-based Weblogs and Websites

2010–2011: Manager of the Jury for the Book Center of the House of Music Festival

2008–2010: Manager of the House of Music Research Center

2008–2023: Online journalist, Columnist and writer at Khabar online

2006–2023: board member of Iranian Journalists Association

2006–2009: Manager of the Dispute Committee of the Iranian Journalists Association

2005–2008: board member, Secretary and Spokesman for the House of Music Research Center

2003–2004: Director at the second Iranian festival of the book and media at House of Book

2003–2013: Inspector of the Co-operative Housing of Iranian Journalists Association

2003–2006: Inspector of the Board of Iranian Journalists Association and Secretary of the Dispute Resolution Committee

2001–2005: Director of the Professional Referees for the Press Festival Department of Reports and Articles on Art and Culture

== Publications ==
2016: Seyed Abolhassan Mokhtabad, Nashr and Neveshtar. Book House Publications

2009: Seyed Abolhassan Mokhtabad, Biography of Ruhollah Khaleghi. Amirkabir Publications

2007: Seyed Abolhassan Mokhtabad, Baharestan. Hamshahri Publications

== Presentations ==
2012: Seyed Abolhassan Mokhtabad, Reviewing Iranian publications and newspapers' problems, 4th Seminar on Iranian Press, Tehran.

2009: Seyed Abolhassan Mokhtabad, Reviewing Iranian music council and development Iranian music, International Radio Seminar, Tehran.

2009: Seyed Abolhassan Mokhtabad, Art management and development music, 1st International Art Seminar in Iran

2008: Seyed Abolhassan Mokhtabad, "Three Decades of Music" conference on country and prominent music at the Iranian Artists Forum
