= Robert J. Winglass =

American politician (1935–2023)

Member of the Maine House of Representatives from the Auburn district
- In office 1995–1998

Personal details
- Born: October 22, 1935 Cambridge, Massachusetts, U.S.
- Died: January 28, 2023 (aged 87) Melbourne, Florida, U.S.
- Party: Republican

Military service
- Branch/service: United States Marine Corps
- Years of service: 1957–1992
- Rank: Lieutenant General

Robert Joseph Winglass (October 22, 1935 – January 28, 2023) was an American politician from Maine and former United States Marine Corps general. From 1957 to 1992, Winglass was a Senior Officer in the United States Marine Corps. Prior to his retirement, he was Chief of Staff for Installations and Logistics at U.S Marine Corps Headquarters in Washington, D.C., having achieved the rank of Lieutenant General. A Republican, Winglass served in the Maine House of Representatives from 1995 to 1998. He ran unsuccessfully for election in 2010 for District 62 in Auburn and was subsequently appointed Commissioner of Labor in the newly elected Paul LePage administration in June 2011. He resigned as labor commissioner in August 2012.

Winglass was born in Cambridge, Massachusetts and graduated from Springfield College in 1957 with a B.S. in education. He also earned a M.A. in international affairs from George Washington University in 1969. While in the Marine Corps, Winglass was decorated with a Navy Distinguished Service Medal and three Legion of Merit awards. He lived in Bath while serving as Labor Commissioner and, shortly before resigning, sold his Bath home and moved to his retirement home in Surry. He is married to Norma Winglass and they have four children.

Executive director of the Maine AFL-CIO Matt Schlobohm said of Winglass,

We found him to be someone who was very concerned about working people in our state and genuinely worked on important issues. ... We found him to be a voice of reason within an administration and governor who, far too often, has shown contempt for Maine's hard-working people.

He died on January 28, 2023, at the age of 87. He will be interred at Quantico National Cemetery on August 4, 2023.
