= Jean Gevenois =

Belgian physical therapist and politician (1931–2023)

Member of the Senate of Belgium
- In office 1983–1996

Personal details
- Born: 13 July 1931 Hornu, Belgium
- Died: 10 January 2023 (aged 91) Hornu, Boussu, Belgium
- Party: PS
- Occupation: Physical therapist

Jean Gevenois (13 July 1931 – 10 January 2023) was a Belgian physical therapist and politician.

== Biography ==
After his studies in kinesiotherapy, Gevenois worked in a clinic in Baudour until 1981.

Gevenois became notable within trade unions during the Belgian general strike of 1960–1961 and became a municipal councillor of Hornu in 1964 as a member of the Socialist Party. He then became schepen in 1971. He remained in this position when the village was incorporated into Boussu in 1977 and served until 1996. In 1983, he became a Senator and served in this position until 1996. During his time in the Senate, he defended public transportation, specifically the National Railway Company of Belgium.

Gevenois died in Hornu on 10 January 2023, at the age of 91.
