= Miki Takai =

Japanese announcer (1967–2023)

- Born: Takai Miki; 28 December 1967; Osaka, Japan
- Died: 25 January 2023 (aged 55); Osaka, Japan
- Occupation: Announcer of Mainichi Broadcasting System
- Years active: 1990–2023

Miki Takai (Japanese: 高井 美紀, romanized: Takai Miki; 28 December 1967 – 25 January 2023) was an announcer who belonged to Mainichi Broadcasting System (MBS), and was the former deputy announcer of the Mainichi Broadcasting System.

She died suddenly during her tenure as "chief announcer". She is survived by one daughter.

== Biography ==
Born in Kobe City, Hyogo Prefecture, her biological father works for a trading company. She spent her kindergarten years in Portugal and her elementary school years 4–6 in the Netherlands because of her biological father's overseas assignment.

None of these countries corresponded to English-speaking countries, but it is said that she was good at English conversation from that time.

After returning to Japan from the Netherlands, she entered Nishinomiya Municipal Taisha Junior High School. After transferring to Kobe Municipal Motoyama Junior High School, she went on to Hyogo Prefectural Mikage High School, and she entered Kobe Jogakuin University's Faculty of Literature, Department of English Literature. She didn't aspire to be an announcer until she was a university student, but when she was in her fourth year, she was introduced by her friend and participated in the Mainichi Broadcasting "Announcement Seminar". Through this seminar, which doubled as an announcer employment exam, she was unofficially hired as an announcer.

After graduating from university, she officially joined Mainichi Broadcasting on 1 April 1990. The announcers who joined the company at the same time as her are Atsuko Ishida (currently a reporter in the Tokyo branch office's news department) and Takeshi Chiba (currently a cross-media staff member in the news information department).

From her first year at the company, she was the leading newscaster for "MBS Now" (a Kansai local news program broadcast on MBS TV on weekday evenings) and "Mainichi Shimbun TV Evening Edition". In "MBS Now", she served as a newscaster until the end of the program in September 2000. She was also the newscaster for the program "VOICE" that followed for 11 1/2 years from October 2002 to 2 April 2014.

Appeared on JNN national network programs such as "Big Morning" (produced by TBS TV) as a relay reporter and as an assistant for "Shingo Ni Touch!" Appeared regularly in "Chitoko!" for 9 years from the start of broadcasting. She also regularly appeared in Kansai local information and variety shows such as "Adorabu Land", "Rainbow" and "Chichin Puipui". In Chichin Puipui, she was an assistant in the early days of the show.

Despite the fact that she wasn't fluent in English conversation, she successfully conducted interviews in English.

Mainichi Broadcasting, which has been operating both the television broadcasting business and the radio broadcasting business since 1 March 1959 during the "New Japan Broadcasting" era, transferred the radio broadcasting business to "MBS Radio Co., Ltd." on 1 April 2021. Mainichi Broadcasting moved to a single TV station with the transfer, but while Takai was enrolled in the company's general programming station (newly established with the transfer) as an announcer, programs continued to be produced and broadcast by MBS Radio Co., Ltd. She also appeared as "MBS announcer".

== Death ==
From the beginning of 2023, due to poor physical condition, she postponed appearances on programs of which she was in charge ("Imperial Album", "Junito Teniro", etc.), but died suddenly on 25 January of the same year. She died at the age of 55. Mainichi Broadcasting announced for the first time on 2 February that Takai had died and that Takai's wake and funeral had already been held with only close relatives. On the next day (Friday), the obituary was announced to viewers and listeners through "Yonchan TV" and MBS radio's live wide program.

In principle, Mainichi Broadcasting does not publish the obituaries of its employees (excluding executives), but after the death of Takai, who was the current announcer, they said, "I will be in charge of various programs (until the first half of January 2023). Due to this relationship, we decided to announce it (as a special measure) in order to answer the question from the viewers, Why haven't you appeared (recently)?

Takai also revealed that she had been infected with the new coronavirus in mid-January 2023, but from the viewpoint of privacy protection, she only mentioned that the cause of death was unrelated to the infection of the new coronavirus.

The announcement of the obituary by Mainichi Broadcasting (2 February 2023) came as a great shock to Takai's officials, and a colleague's announcer announced Takai's death on his own program on the next day (Friday). When he submitted the report, he left the following comment: Momoko High Heels, who said, "We had a close relationship with each other as a family," said, "I couldn't believe it when I promised to eat with Takai. I wonder if it was,” along with a two-shot image that shows the good relationship with Takai in the past

- Since April 2014, Takai has appeared on MBS radio's "Komori Yasunori Morning Tenkomori!" (Komori Yasunori, a freelance announcer who was a senior when he joined Mainichi Broadcasting, served as a personality every Friday morning (6–7 o'clock). She was a minor assistant for 11 1/2 years on a live wide program that was on. In "Yuichi Kamiizumi's Yeah!", which has taken over the broadcast slot of this program since October 2021, Yuichi Kamiizumi, who is also a manager of the Mainichi Broadcasting Announcement Center, said at the beginning, "Our friend Miki Takai, the announcer, has passed away." Takai appeared in "Asa Kara Tenkomori!" Until 1 year and 4 months ago on the same Friday as the broadcast date, and she and her partner Haruka Maeda (announcer who joined the company in 2021) been unable to finalize program organization. While touching on this, he said, "From now on, we will sincerely face everyone in front of the radio, and we think that 'the best repayment to Mrs. Takai.' I would appreciate it if you could cherish your feelings for Mrs. Takai."
- After 10:00 am, at the beginning of "Matsui Ai no Suko~shi Aishite♥" (MBS Radio's live wide program where Takai was temporarily acting as a personality), she told the listeners with tears about Takai's sudden death. report. "(The sudden death) is very sad, and I still can't accept it as a 'real thing,'" she said. I will keep talking. I will keep telling you.”
- On MBS Radio broadcast from 3:00 pm, "Fukushima Nobuhiro's Friday is fine?" A senior announcer who is a senior in Fukushima) looks back on Takai during his life in the opening talk. Fukushima said, "I've lost a veteran and excellent colleague, so I'm feeling sad (right now). I love broadcasting more than anyone else. He was the one who made the (studio) lively.” While remembering Takai, Sekioka, who used to be the announcement manager of Mainichi Broadcasting, said, I was watching it at my desk.I believe that listening to the usual broadcasts will be a memorial service for (Takai) Miki-chan."
- On MBS Radio's "Yamahiro's Pikaichi Radio" broadcast from 9:00 pm, Keiko Furukawa, partner of "Yamahiro" (freelance announcer Hiroyuki Yamamoto from Kansai Television), said, "In my life, 'I have such a painful experience. Reported Takai's death with the expression "Is there something there?" She then said, "My job is to be an announcer, so I'm going to have fun as usual today," she said. Takai has also been a partner of "Japan's Brightest Economic Denpa Shimbun" on MBS Radio since October 2015, but due to her poor physical condition, Furukawa acted as a partner from the broadcast on January 22, 2023. On the same program on February 5, after playing the sound source of the corner recorded by Furukawa on January 25, the day Takai died, Furukawa informed the listeners of Takai's death. In terms of organization, the broadcast start time is set at 15:40, but in reality, the main part (Kansai local part) often starts at 15:43. It was devoted to the obituary of On the day of the event, Takai's juniors (general moderator Naoya Kawata, studio manager Etsuko Ueda, and news commentator Hajime Misawa) appeared together from the beginning, so the three introduced episodes related to Takai during her lifetime. Kawata, who said, "My home was nearby and we had a family relationship even in private," said, "He was a really cheerful, bright, and positive person. (Mr. Takai) is great at his work (movement), but (to Mainichi Broadcasting Corporation's head office) he is humming while coming to work, and being scolded by his juniors, Ueda said, He's a senior who has so many things I love so much, and he took care of us juniors so much that he took care of us. I remembered his character. In addition, Misawa, who has been transferred from an announcer to TBS ("Tetsuya Chikushi" subcaster of "NEWS23") and has become a commentator at the news and information bureau (resident in Tokyo branch office), was a senior Takai in "MBS Now" when he was an announcer. He shared his memories of when he was a caster. "I was in charge of the news (the main caster of MBS Now) in my third year with the company, but even when I failed, (Takai) always said, 'Don't worry about it,' with a smile and a hum. (Now) I only have memories of 'That smile helped me a lot.'"

=== Mainichi Broadcasting Group's response after announcing sudden death ===
Of the programs that Takai was in charge of on a regular basis until he fell ill, Etsuko Ueda took turns in narrating "Imperial Album", which was broadcast on 16 April 2023 (on Mainichi Broadcasting System) after female junior announcers took turns in charge. (detailed in the relevant section). In the same year, Takai appeared as a "listener" (an interviewer with management) until January 2023 in "The Leader" (a recorded program organized by Mainichi Broadcasting Corporation early in the morning on the second Sunday of every month). Ueda has been a "listener" since the broadcast on 12 March.

Takai participated in the studio recording (21 December 2022), which was supposed to be broadcast on 4 February 2023 (Saturday). In the subsequent studio recordings (broadcasts after 28 January 2023), except for some broadcasts, her junior announcer Saori Tsuji temporarily assumed Takai's role (navigator in the studio part). had taken over. However, since 4 February is the first broadcast day after Mainichi Broadcasting announced the obituary, the recorded studio footage will be broadcast according to the original schedule on that day. At the time of broadcasting, a telop indicating the recording date was added in the editing work, and a message video in memory of Takai was inserted in the ending part. Tsuji's appearance is only 4 times (on air, including after the announcement of his obituary), and the studio part is not included in the broadcast times until 22 April (or some scenes from the recorded studio part are omitted by editing. The composition continued, but from the broadcast on 29 April (both for Kansai local), Mirai Kaito (junior announcer who joined the company in 2022) was selected as the second navigator.

On MBS Radio, some of the programs recorded during her lifetime (such as "Earthquake Disaster Prevention Memo") and some of her commercials will be broadcast even after the announcement of her obituary. From 19 February 2023, Takai will appear on 11 January (Wednesday) in the "Japan's Brightest Economic Denpa Newspaper", which has organized the "Osaka/Kansai Expo Special" (special interview with the producer of the theme business) four times from 19 February 2023. The sound source of the interview recording (guest is Hiroshi Ishiguro) was broadcast on 19 and 26 February according to the original schedule. Furukawa is appearing again in the broadcast in March, but from 2 April, Hiroko Matsukawa (junior announcer) will formally assume the role of Takai (the title on the broadcast is "editorial staff"). has taken over.

In addition, "MBS Announcer Kotonoha Monogatari no Sekai 2023" was held at the Toyonaka Municipal Culture and Arts Center on 5 March 2023, as a paid performance twice in the afternoon and evening (some announcers participated in the project of the Mainichi Broadcasting Announcement Center). At the reading event), it was announced at the end of 2022 that Takai would participate in the reading of the daytime performance. Since he died suddenly in the middle of preparations starting in 2022, when the performance was held, his senior, Kaori Sekioka, who was originally scheduled to appear only in the evening performance (was the director of the announcement department when he was a TV and radio station). Senior announcer) also participated in the daytime performance. Kawata, who was entrusted with the leader of the performance, devoted himself to the progress of the afternoon and evening performances, and there was an act in which he remembered Takai while being deeply moved by the finale greeting.

== Life Events ==
- After joining Mainichi Broadcasting System and getting married, he lived in a two-story house in Higashinada Ward, Kobe City, but in the early morning of 17 January 1995, he encountered the Great Hanshin-Awaji Earthquake. her husband and Mrs. Miki Takai, who were asleep in their room on the second floor, barely escaped, but the damage was so severe that the first floor of their house was completely destroyed. She was telling the local misery with tears.
- In October 2000, she went on maternity leave due to the pregnancy of her first child.
- On 29 September 2005 (Thursday), she participated in the Hanshin Tigers' Central League victory celebration, her first time as a representative of MBS. She was 37 years old when she participated, and until now (as of July 2021), she is the oldest female announcer (belonging to a broadcasting station) who covered the pattern of beer pouring at the victory party.
- According to a testimony in "MBS Baseball Park Extra Edition" (MBS Radio), which appeared on the phone on 25 July 2021, Kazuki Masuda, who was working as an announcer at the time, said, "Only on September 29th Three days before (the 26th), he was asked to stand by after the performance of 'VOICE', which he was in charge of at the time." It also appeared in the live broadcast of the final version of the national news on weekdays). It's been a long time since I was in charge of a sports program, so when I headed to the victory celebration venue, Katsuo Hirata, who used to be a baseball commentator for Mainichi Broadcasting (then head coach of the Hanshin 1st Army), said, "Miki-chan! You're beautiful." He also revealed that beer was suddenly thrown from behind, and that another announcer was scheduled to be in charge if Hanshin's victory was not decided on 29 September. Appeared in only one scene in the movie "Japan Sinks" (2006 version, MBS produced and invested). On 5 August 2006, she appeared on Kansai TV's "Nanbo DE Nambo" with a comment on Maiko Matsumoto, who appeared across the boundaries of the station as MBS representative. Takai himself has appeared as a guest on Kansai TV's "Knock is useless!" with Shingo Yamashiro, who co-starred in "Shingo Ni Touch!" at the time. He is also in charge of radio opening and closing announcements (previously Tomoko Yoshida and Chie Mikami were in charge). In addition, Asako Nishimura will be in charge of the radio closing announcement from April 2011, and Ai Matsui from January 2012. In the past, he had a blog called Hibi Komogomo on the announcer page on the Mainichi Broadcasting official website, but the frequency of updates was very low compared to other announcers, and in 2016 he updated it for the first time in 13 years (2018 Moved to the current "MBS Ana Blog" from April 2014). He has a habit of humming unexpectedly in places other than broadcasting, and it is used for regular news for MBS radio. She has been suffering from rhinitis for several years, and in late December 2019, she underwent submucosal submucosal nasal turbinate resection, nasal septum correction, and endoscopic sinus surgery.
