= Tanya Leise =

American biomathematician

Tanya L. Leise (died January 18, 2023) was an American biomathematician specializing in the mathematical modeling of circadian rhythms and related phenomena such as jet lag and hibernation. She was a professor of mathematics at Amherst College.

== Education and career ==
Leise was a 1993 graduate of Stanford University. She went to Texas A&M University for graduate study, completing a Ph.D. there in 1998. Her dissertation, An Analog to the Dirichlet-to-Nuemann Map and Its Application to Dynamic Elastic Fracture, was supervised by Jay R. Walton.

After working as a visiting lecturer at Indiana University, she joined the faculty of the Rose–Hulman Institute of Technology in 1999. She moved to Amherst as a visiting assistant professor in 2004, obtained a regular-rank faculty position in 2007, and was promoted to full professor in 2018.

She died of cancer on January 18, 2023.

== Service ==
Leise was co-chair of the Joint Committee on Women in the Mathematical Sciences, sponsored by a group of seven major mathematical societies, from 2011 to 2014.

She has also chaired the Amherst Ranked-Choice Voting Commission.

== Recognition ==
Leise was a winner of the 2008 Lester R. Ford Award of the Mathematical Association of America for her paper with her husband, psychologist Andrew Cohen, "Nonlinear oscillators at our fingertips".
