= King Phojanakong =

American chef (1968–2023)

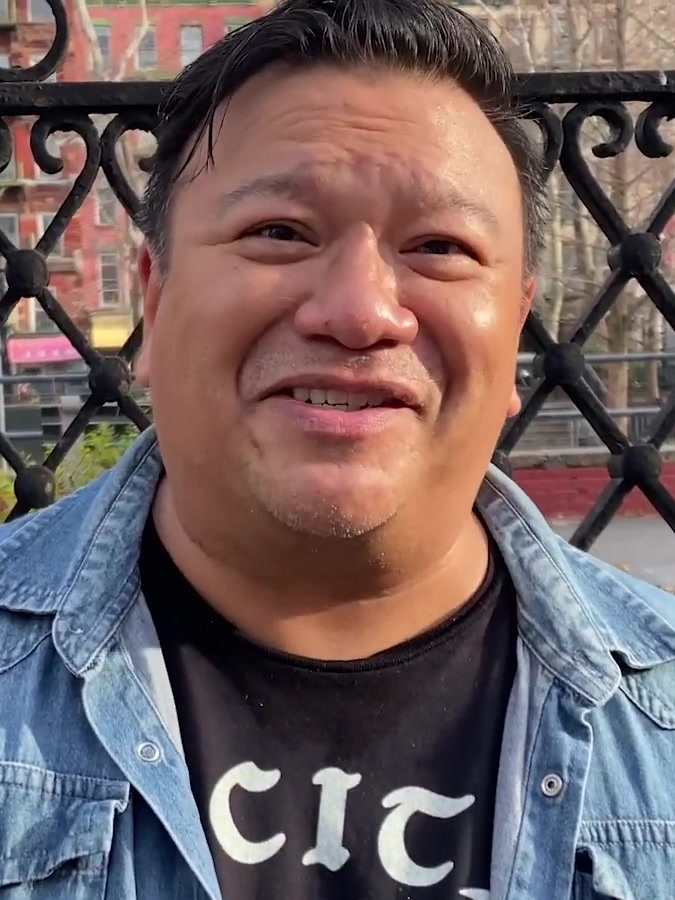
- Phojanakong in 2022
- Born: August 18, 1968; Manhattan, New York, U.S.
- Died: January 2, 2023 (aged 54); Manhattan, New York, U.S.
- Occupation: Chef

King Phojanakong (August 18, 1968 – January 2, 2023) was an American chef.

== Early life and education ==
Born in and raised in Stuyvesant Town-Peter Cooper Village, Manhattan on August 18, 1968, Phojanakong spent most of his life in Stuyvesant Town-Peter Cooper Village. His mother, Zosima "Emma" (Arceo) Phojanakong, was a Filipino nurse, while his father, also named King, was from Thailand.

After attending the Bronx High School of Science, Phojanakong pursued studies at the State University of New York at Purchase and the City College of New York. He later earned an associate degree from the Culinary Institute of America in 1998.

== Career ==
His culinary career spanned positions at notable Manhattan restaurants, including Daniel, Jean-Georges, and Danube.

In 2003, he founded Kuma Inn on Ludlow Street, its name inspired by the Tagalog term "kumain". This establishment was among the early sit-down Filipino restaurants in Manhattan, with only Cendrillon opening earlier in 1995.

By 2009, Phojanakong had launched Umi Nom in Brooklyn, which showcased Filipino food often paired with drinking. Umi Nom ceased operations in 2015, and Kuma Inn closed in 2021 due to the COVID-19 pandemic. Phojanakong's subsequent projects included a pop-up at Jimmy's No. 43 and the Cook Like King cooking classes.

Phojanakong died in Manhattan on January 2, 2023, at the age of 54.
