= Uyen Sinwa Nhpan Ja Ra =

Kachin classical singer

Uyen Sinwa Nhpan Ja Ra (Burmese: အင်ဖန်းဂျာရာ; 1932 − 9 January 2023) was a Kachin classical singer who is regarded as the 'mother of Kachin art'.

== Career ==
Uyen sang the song of honor at the signing of the Panglong Agreement in 1947. In 1948, she became the first Kachin national classical songwriter. In 1969–1974, she founded the Buga Band, which became the first band in Kachin State. In 1954, she led the First (B.B.S) The First Kachin Woman Stereo & Radio Vocalist at Burma Broadcasting Service in Kachin Section. She composed more than 600 songs in Burmese, Jingpho, and English.

During the period of 1955–88, she served as the state athletic director in Burma, becoming the first female state athletic director. From 1972 to 1978, she served as a judge and was the first female judge of the Kachin people. She was also the first Kachin woman to give a speech at the 28th Union Day ceremony held in Kachin State in 1975. From 1990 to 1996, she served as the general secretary of the Kachin Baptist Federation. Uyen was also a consultant of the Kachin National Consultative (WMR), which has great influence among the Kachin community.

== Death ==
She died on 9 January 2023 in Myitkyina at the age of 91.
