= Lázaro Valdés =

Cuban musician (1940–2023)

- Born: 17 December 1940; Havana, Cuba
- Died: 1 January 2023 (aged 82); Havana, Cuba
- Genres: Son, Jazz
- Occupations: Pianist; songwriter

Lázaro Valdés Espinosa (17 December 1940 – 1 January 2023) was a Cuban son and jazz musician, pianist, and songwriter.

== Biography ==
Valdés was born on 17 December 1940 in Havana, the son of percussionist Oscar Valdés (1912–2003). He studied at the Conservatorio Profesional de Música "Mariano Pérez Sánchez" and played in several big bands in the 1950s and 1960s. He was then the pianist of Benny Moré's Banda Gigante, a band he led for several years after Benny Moré's death in 1963. Valdés was known for his son and jazz songs; he also led his own groups with which he recorded albums. Valdés has received several awards for his many years of work as a prominent musician, including the Raúl Gómez García Medal (the Union of Cultural Workers) and the National Culture Prize of the Ministry of Culture.

== Personal life and death ==
Valdés was the brother of Oscar Valdés Jr. and father of Lázaro "Lázarito" Valdés Jr. (born 1965), who is also a pianist (and leader of the band Bamboleo). Valdés died on 1 January 2023, 15 days after his 83rd birthday.

== Discography ==
- De Tal Palo... Tal Valdes (Pimienta Records, 2003)
- Lázaro Valdés Y Son Jazz: Manteca (Bis Music, 2011)
- Lazaro Valdés Y Lazarito Valdés: Benny, Sin Ti No Hay Fiesta (Egrem, 2017)
