= Luiz Suzin Marini =

Brazilian politician (1935–2023)

Member of the Legislative Assembly of Santa Catarina
- In office 1991–1999

Personal details
- Born: 28 September 1935; Concórdia, Brazil
- Died: 31 January 2023 (aged 87); Florianópolis, Brazil
- Political party: PMDB

Luiz Suzin Marini (28 September 1935 – 31 January 2023) was a Brazilian politician. A member of the Brazilian Democratic Movement Party, he served in the Legislative Assembly of Santa Catarina from 1991 to 1999.

Suzin Marini died of colon cancer in Florianópolis, on 31 January 2023, at the age of 87.
