= Enaxon Siddiqova =

Uzbek poet and politician (1954–2023)

Member of the Senate of Uzbekistan
- In office 2015 – 13 January 2023

Personal details
- Born: 28 August 1954 Oltiariq District, Fergana Region, Uzbek SSR, USSR
- Died: 13 January 2023 (aged 68) Fergana, Uzbekistan
- Education: Fergana State Institute
- Occupation: Poet

Enaxon Siddiqova (28 August 1954 – 13 January 2023) was an Uzbek poet and politician. She served in the Senate from 2015 to 2023.

Siddiqova died in Fergana on 13 January 2023, at the age of 68.
