= Julien Goekint =

Belgian politician (1929–2023)

Mayor of Ostend
- In office 7 November 1980 – 7 May 1997

Personal details
- Born: 8 October 1929 Bredene, Belgium
- Died: 20 January 2023 (aged 93) Ostend, Belgium
- Party: Christian Social Party
- Occupation: Politician

Julien Goekint (8 October 1929 – 20 January 2023) was a Belgian politician and a member of the Christian Social Party. Goekint was mayor of Ostend between 1980 and 1997.

== Biography ==
Goekint was born in Bredene in 1929. He worked in his father's printing house since his early years. In the 1960s, the company moved to the new industrial park, where Goekint continued to build the company. Jan Piers convinced him to become a party member of the Christian Social Party. With some doubt Goekint accepted the offer. A few years later he succeeded Piers as mayor of Ostend on 7 November 1980. He served as the mayor of the city for almost 17 years. Meanwhile two of his sons built the company. Ostend continued to grow under his mayorship. Goekint served as the basis of a large number of projects. In 1992 he organized a competition for renewal of Casino-Kursaal Oostende; but in 1994 the plans for a new building were not continued. The Port of Ostend and Ostend–Bruges International Airport also continued to grow during the time of Goekint as mayor.

On 7 May 1997, Goekint resigned as mayor and was succeeded by Jean Vandecasteele. After founding the Autonoom gemeentebedrijf of Port of Ostend, he became the first managing director.

Goekint was married to Georgette Sleuyter. They were married for seventy years in August 2020. He died in Ostend on 20 January 2023, at the age of 93.
