= Willem Doise =

Belgian academic and psychologist (1935–2023)

- Born: 20 July 1935; Poperinge, Belgium
- Died: 8 January 2023 (aged 87)
- Education: University of Paris
- Occupations: Academic; Psychologist

Willem Doise (20 July 1935 – 8 January 2023) was a Belgian academic and social psychologist.

== Biography ==
Born in Poperinge on 20 July 1935, Doise earned a degree in psychology from the University of Paris in 1964. From 1965 to 1966, he specialized in social and clinical psychology at the Institute of Psychology of the University of Paris, where he earned a doctorate in 1967.

From 1967 to 1968, Doise worked as a researcher at the French National Centre for Scientific Research. In 1970, he became a professor at the University of Geneva, where he was president of the psychology department from 1983 to 1985 and from 1989 to 1991. In 1997, he supervised the thesis, titled Valeurs et représentations sociales des droits de l'homme, of Dario Spini, who would become a professor at the University of Lausanne in 2011.

Doise's research focuses in particular on the study of social representation, collective decision-making, and socio-cognitive development. He also studied the links between psychology and sociology. He broke down psychology into four different levels to be researched: the intra-individual level, the inter-individual level, the positional level, and the ideological level.

Willem Doise died on 8 January 2023, at the age of 87.

== Publications ==
- L'articulation psychosociologique et les relations entre groupes (1976)
- L’Explication en psychologie sociale (1982)
- L’Étude des représentations sociales (with A. Palmonari, 1986)
- Représentations sociales et analyses de données (with A. Clemence and F. Lorenzi-Cioldi, 1992)
- Dissensions et Consensus (with S. Moscovici, 1992)

== Honors ==
- Medal of the University of Helsinki (1989)
- Honorary doctorate from Panteion University (1997)
- Médaille du Fonds de Recherche Scientifique Flandre (1998)
- Honorary doctorate from Alexandru Ioan Cuza University (1999)
- Honorary doctorate from the University of Bologna (2005)
- Honorary doctorate from the University of Helsinki
