= Donald Snyder (general) =

United States Air Force general

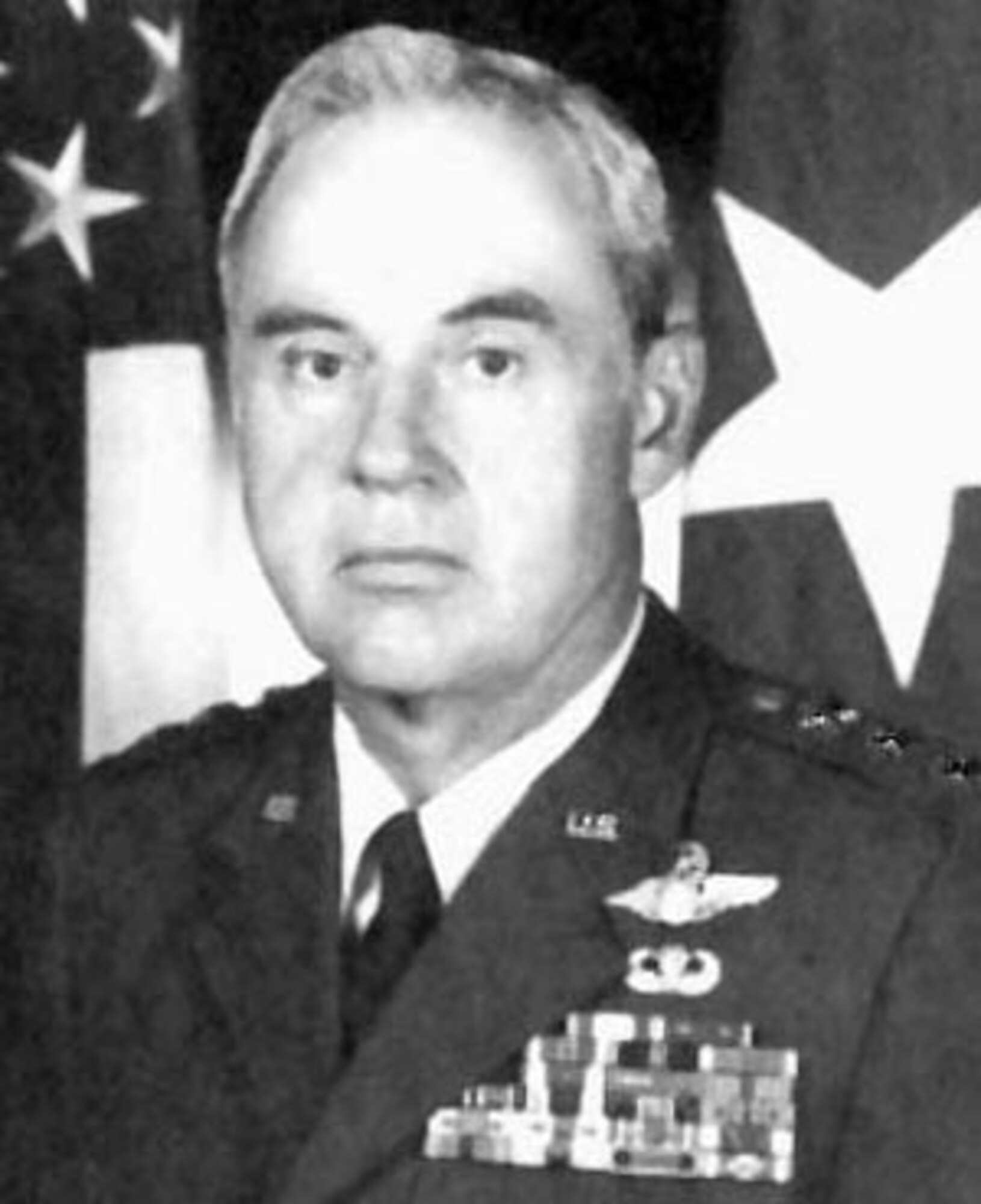
- Born: January 26, 1936; Pittsburgh, Pennsylvania, U.S.
- Died: January 1, 2023 (aged 86); Saxonburg, Pennsylvania, U.S.
- Military career
- Allegiance: United States
- Branch: United States Air Force
- Service years: 1957–1992
- Rank: Lieutenant general
- Commands: Vice Commander, Tactical Air Command; Deputy commander in chief and chief of staff, U.S. Special Operations Command; Deputy chief of staff for operations, Pacific Air Forces

Donald Snyder (January 26, 1936 – January 1, 2023) was a lieutenant general in the United States Air Force who served as vice commander of Tactical Air Command from 1991 until his retirement in 1992.
