= John Joseph Thomas Owen =

English immunologist (1934–2023)

John Joseph Thomas Hayes Owen FRS (7 January 1934 – 5 January 2023) was an English immunologist who studied and uncovered how T and B cell lymphocytes are produced.

John Owen grew up in Liverpool, where he would also attend the University of Liverpool, studying anatomy and medicine, before becoming a lecturer and MD, and beginning his research into the immune system. In the 60s and 70s he moved to positions at Oxford University, University College London, and the University of Newcastle, before arriving at the University of Birmingham in 1978 where he would remain until retirement in 2000.

His early discoveries while at Oxford, uncovering details of how T and B lymphocyte cells are produced, would set the course for his career investigating the immune system in vertebrates, and the role the thymus plays.

He was elected Fellow of the Royal Society in 1988, and the Academy of Medical Sciences in 1998.
