= Peter Stead (cricketer) =

Canadian cricketer (1930–2023)

Personal information
- Full name: Peter Stead
- Born: 22 September 1930; Middleton, Yorkshire, England
- Died: 25 January 2023 (aged 92); Australia
- Batting: Right-handed
- Bowling: Right-arm fast-medium

Domestic team information
- Years: Team
- 1954: Canada

Career statistics
Competition	First-class
Matches	3
Runs scored	6
Batting average	6.00
100s/50s	–/–
Top score	4*
Balls bowled	401
Wickets	9
Bowling average	19.66
5 wickets in innings	–
10 wickets in match	–
Best bowling	4/52
Catches/stumpings	–/–
- Source: CricketArchive, 14 October 2011

Peter Stead (22 September 1930 – 25 January 2023) was an English cricketer. He was a right-handed batsman and a right-arm fast-medium bowler. He played three first-class matches for Canada on their 1954 tour of England, in which he took nine wickets at an average of 19.66. He died in Australia on 25 January 2023, at the age of 92.

== Sources ==
- Cricket Archive profile
- Cricinfo profile
