= Joyce Dopkeen =

American photographer

- Born: October 23, 1942
- Died: January 31, 2023 (aged 80)
- Occupation: Photographer

Joyce Dopkeen (October 23, 1942 – January 31, 2023) was an American photographer. She was the first woman to work as a full-time staff photographer for The New York Times.

In 1974, she received the Front Page Award for best photograph, for her "picture of outgoing Mayor Lindsay pouring champagne on the heads of his aides".

== Legacy ==
Dopkeen's archives are held in the Boston Globe Library Special Collections.
