= Raymond Mertens =

Belgian football player and manager (1933–2023)

Personal information
- Date of birth: 19 July 1933
- Place of birth: Sint-Pieters-Leeuw, Belgium
- Date of death: 9 January 2023 (aged 89)
- Position: Goalkeeper

Senior career*
Years	Team	Apps	(Gls)
1952–1955	KV Zuun		
1955–1965	R. Uccle Sport		

Managerial career
- 1965–1971: KV Zuun
- 1971–1973: Anderlecht (U23 coach)
- 1973–1975: Union Saint-Gilloise (assistant coach)
- 1975–1979: K.V. Kortrijk (assistant coach)
- 1979–1981: Club Brugge (assistant coach)
- 1981: Eendracht Aalst (assistant coach)
- 1981–1989: Club Brugge (assistant coach)
- 1989–1990: Club Brugge (U23 coach)
- 1990–1992: Charleroi (assistant coach)
- * Club domestic league appearances and goals

Raymond Mertens (19 July 1933 – 9 January 2023) was a Belgian football player and manager who played as a goalkeeper.
