= Jean-Pierre Swings =

American-born Belgian astronomer (1943–2023)

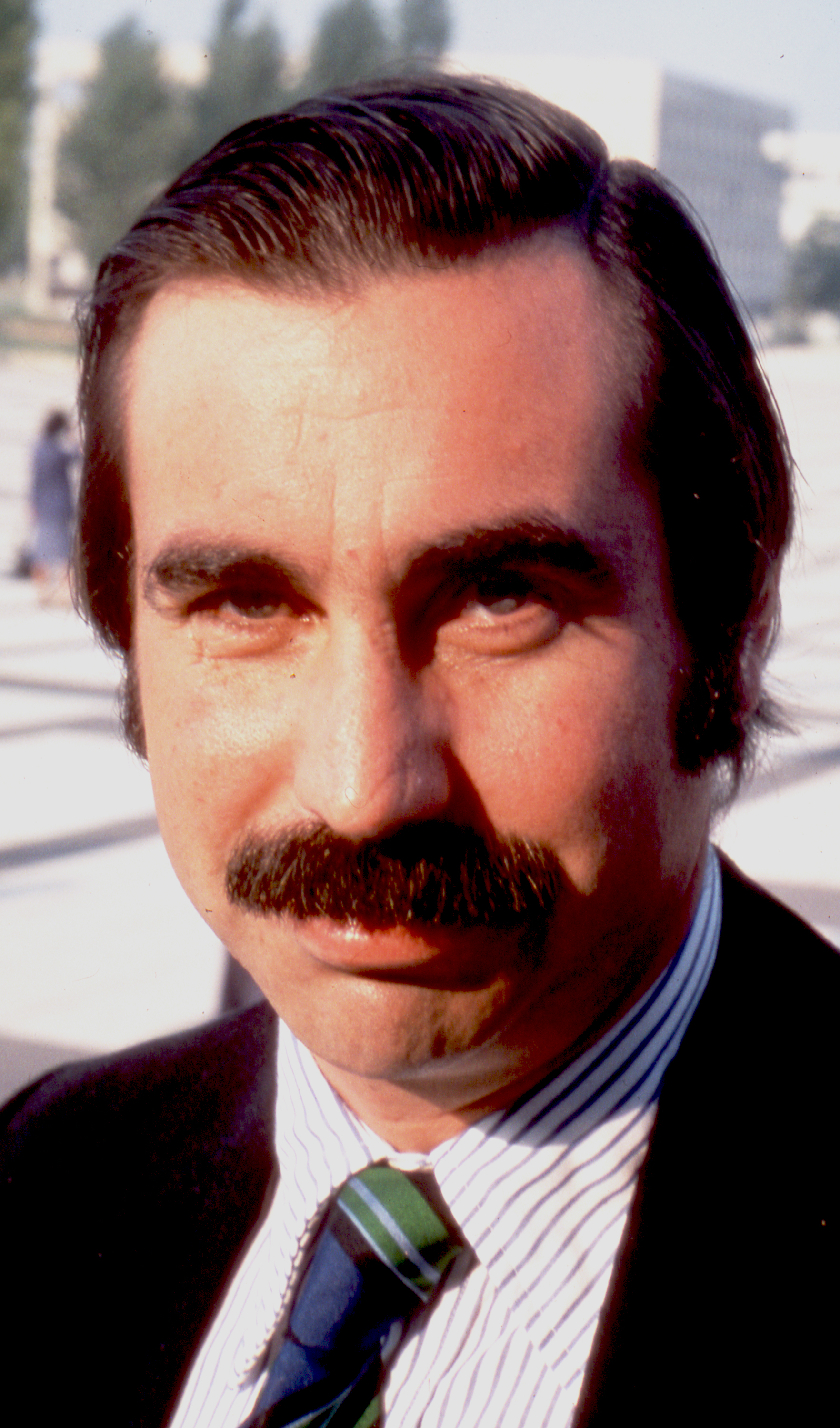
- Swings in 1976
- Born: 25 June 1943; Pasadena, California, U.S.
- Died: 16 January 2023 (aged 79); Liège, Belgium
- Education: University of Liège
- Occupation: Astronomer
- Spouse: Nadine Duschesne
- Children: 2

Jean-Pierre Swings (25 June 1943 – 16 January 2023) was an American-born Belgian astronomer. An honorary professor of the University of Liège, he was assistant general secretary of the International Astronomical Union from 1982 to 1985, then general secretary from 1985 to 1988.

== Biography ==
Swings was born in Pasadena, California, on 25 June 1943, to astrophysicist Pol Swings. He earned a master's degree in spatial engineering and a doctorate in astrophysics from the University of Liège. After serving as Assistant General Secretary from 1982 to 1985 and Secretary General of the International Astronomical Union from 1985 to 1988, he served as President of the European Space Science Committee of the European Science Foundation and a member of the Space Advisory Board of the 7th Framework Programmes for Research and Technological Development of the European Commission.

Swings was married to Nadine Duschesne, with whom he had two sons: Anthony and William. He died in Liège on 16 January 2023, at the age of 79.
