= Vladimir Timochkin =

Soviet-Russian mechanic and politician (1936–2023)

- Владимир Тимочкин

Member of the Supreme Soviet of the Soviet Union
- In office 1979–1989

Personal details
- Born: Vladimir Ivanovich Timochkin; 22 December 1936 Mosyagino, Sverdlovsk Oblast, Russian SFSR, USSR
- Died: 9 January 2023 (aged 86) Berezniki, Russia
- Occupation: Mechanic

Vladimir Ivanovich Timochkin (Russian: Владимир Иванович Тимочкин; 22 December 1936 – 9 January 2023) was a Soviet-Russian mechanic and politician. He served on the Supreme Soviet of the Soviet Union from 1979 to 1989.

Timochkin died in Berezniki on 9 January 2023 at the age of 86.
