= Ted Schwarzman =

Australian rules footballer (1946–2023)

Personal information
- Full name: Edward Christopher Schwarzman
- Born: 8 March 1946
- Died: 18 January 2023 (aged 76)
- Original team: CBC St Kilda
- Height: 185 cm (6 ft 1 in)
- Weight: 73 kg (161 lb)

Playing career^{1}
Years	Club	Games (Goals)
1965, 1967	St Kilda	8 (0)
- ^{1} Playing statistics correct to the end of 1967.

Edward Christopher Schwarzman (8 March 1946 – 18 January 2023) was an Australian rules footballer who played with St Kilda in the Victorian Football League (VFL).

Schwarzman later played with Sandringham in the Victorian Football Association. He died on 18 January 2023, at the age of 76.
