= Jean-Claude Coquet =

French linguist and semiotician (1928–2023)

- Born: 29 March 1928; Sens, France
- Died: 16 January 2023 (aged 94); Sceaux, Hauts-de-Seine, France
- Occupations: Linguist; Semiotician

Jean-Claude Coquet (29 March 1928 – 16 January 2023) was a French linguist and semiotician.

== Publications ==
- Sémiotique littéraire. Contribution à l'analyse sémantique du discours (1973)
- Le discours et son sujet I. Essai de grammaire modale (1984)
- Le discours et son sujet II. Pratique de la grammaire modale (1985)
- La Quête du sens. Le Langage en question (1997)
- Phusis et Logos. Une Phénoménologie du langage (2007)
- Phénoménologie du langage (2022)
