= Mimosa (magician) =

French magician (1960–2023)

- Born: Hervé Le Marchand; 1 May 1960; Lannion, France
- Died: 3 January 2023 (aged 62); Paris, France
- Education: École Centrale Paris; Lycée de l'Immaculée-Conception; Lycée Chateaubriand de Rennes
- Occupation: Magician

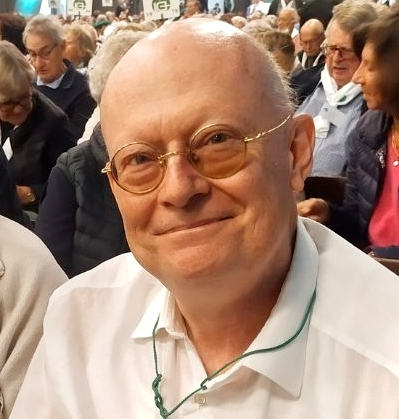
A 2022 photo of Hervé

Hervé Le Marchand (1 May 1960 – 3 January 2023), better known by the stage name of Mimosa, was a French humorous magician.

== Biography ==
Le Marchand was a student at the École Centrale Paris, where he was a member of the circus and magic club, graduating in 1985 after partaking in the Gala des grandes écoles. After his graduation, he worked as a computer engineer while continuing to practice magic.

In 1989, Le Marchand won the first prize at the Festival mondial du cirque de demain in Paris. He then dedicated himself full-time to magic, winning circus prizes in Geneva and Norway.

Le Marchand was married to a Thai woman and spent three months out of each year in Japan. He died in Paris on 3 January 2023, at the age of 62.
