= Manfred Böcker =

German politician (1940–2023)

Member of the Landtag of North Rhine-Westphalia
- In office 29 May 1980 – 2 June 2005
- Constituency: Landtagswahlkreis Lippe III

Personal details
- Born: 14 March 1940 Essen, Gau Essen, Germany
- Died: 16 January 2023 (aged 82) Augustdorf, North Rhine-Westphalia, Germany
- Party: SPD
- Occupation: Teacher

Manfred Böcker (14 March 1940 – 16 January 2023) was a German politician and teacher. A member of the Social Democratic Party, he served in the Landtag of North Rhine-Westphalia from 1980 to 2005.

Böcker died in Augustdorf on 16 January 2023, at the age of 82.
