= Sven Johansson (politician, 1928–2023) =

Swedish politician (1928–2023)

Governor of Västerbotten County
- In office 1978–1991
- Preceded by: Bengt Lyberg
- Succeeded by: Görel Bohlin

Personal details
- Born: 25 December 1928 Malmö, Sweden
- Died: 15 January 2023 (aged 94) Stockholm, Sweden
- Party: M

Sven Johansson (25 December 1928 – 15 January 2023) was a Swedish politician. A member of the Moderate Party, he served as Governor of Västerbotten County from 1978 to 1991.

Johansson died in Stockholm on 15 January 2023, at the age of 94.
