= 2023 in Russia =

- Decades: 2000s; 2010s; 2020s
- See also: History of Russia; Timeline of Russian history; List of years in Russia

Events in the year 2023 in Russia.

== Incumbents ==
- President – Vladimir Putin
- Prime Minister – Mikhail Mishustin

=== Governors ===
- Amur Oblast: Vasily Orlov (ER)
- Arkhangelsk Oblast: Alexander Tsybulsky (ER)
- Astrakhan Oblast: Igor Babushkin (ER)
- Belgorod Oblast: Vyacheslav Gladkov (ER)
- Bryansk Oblast: Alexander Bogomaz (ER)
- Chelyabinsk Oblast: Alexey Teksler (ER)
- Irkutsk Oblast: Igor Kobzev (ER)
- Ivanovo Oblast: Stanislav Voskresensky (ER)
- Kaliningrad Oblast: Anton Alikhanov (ER)
- Kaluga Oblast: Vladislav Shapsha (ER)
- Kemerovo Oblast: Sergey Tsivilyov (ER)
- Kirov Oblast: Alexander Sokolov (ER)
- Kostroma Oblast: Sergey Sitnikov (ER)
- Kurgan Oblast: Vadim Shumkov (ER)
- Kursk Oblast: Roman Starovoyt (ER)
- Leningrad Oblast: Alexander Drozdenko (ER)
- Lipetsk Oblast: Igor Artamonov (ER)
- Magadan Oblast: Sergey Nosov (ER)
- Moscow Oblast: Andrey Vorobyov (ER)
- Murmansk Oblast: Andrey Chibis (ER)
- Nizhny Novgorod Oblast: Gleb Nikitin (ER)
- Novgorod Oblast: Andrey Nikitin (ER)
- Novosibirsk Oblast: Andrey Travnikov (ER)
- Omsk Oblast: Alexander Burkov (until March 29, A Just Russia), Vitaliy Khotsenko (starting March 29, ER)
- Orenburg Oblast: Denis Pasler (ER)
- Oryol Oblast: Andrey Klychkov (CPRF)
- Penza Oblast: Oleg Melnichenko (ER)
- Pskov Oblast: Mikhail Vedernikov (ER)
- Rostov Oblast: Vasily Golubev (ER)
- Ryazan Oblast: Pavel Malkov (ER)
- Sakhalin Oblast: Valery Limarenko (ER)
- Samara Oblast: Dmitry Azarov (ER)
- Saratov Oblast: Roman Busargin (ER)
- Smolensk Oblast: Alexey Ostrovsky (until March 17, LDPR), Vasily Anokhin (starting March 17, Independent / ER ally)
- Tambov Oblast: Maxim Egorov (ER)
- Tomsk Oblast: Vladimir Mazur (ER)
- Tula Oblast: Alexey Dyumin (Independent / ER ally)
- Tver Oblast: Igor Rudenya (ER)
- Tyumen Oblast: Aleksandr Moor (ER)
- Ulyanovsk Oblast: Alexey Russkikh (CPRF)
- Vladimir Oblast: Alexander Avdeyev (ER)
- Volgograd Oblast: Andrey Bocharov (ER)
- Vologda Oblast: Oleg Kuvshinnikov (until October 31, ER), Georgy Filimonov (starting October 31, ER)
- Voronezh Oblast: Alexander Gusev (ER)
- Yaroslavl Oblast: Mikhail Yevrayev (ER)
- Jewish Autonomous Oblast: Rostislav Goldstein (ER)

== Events ==
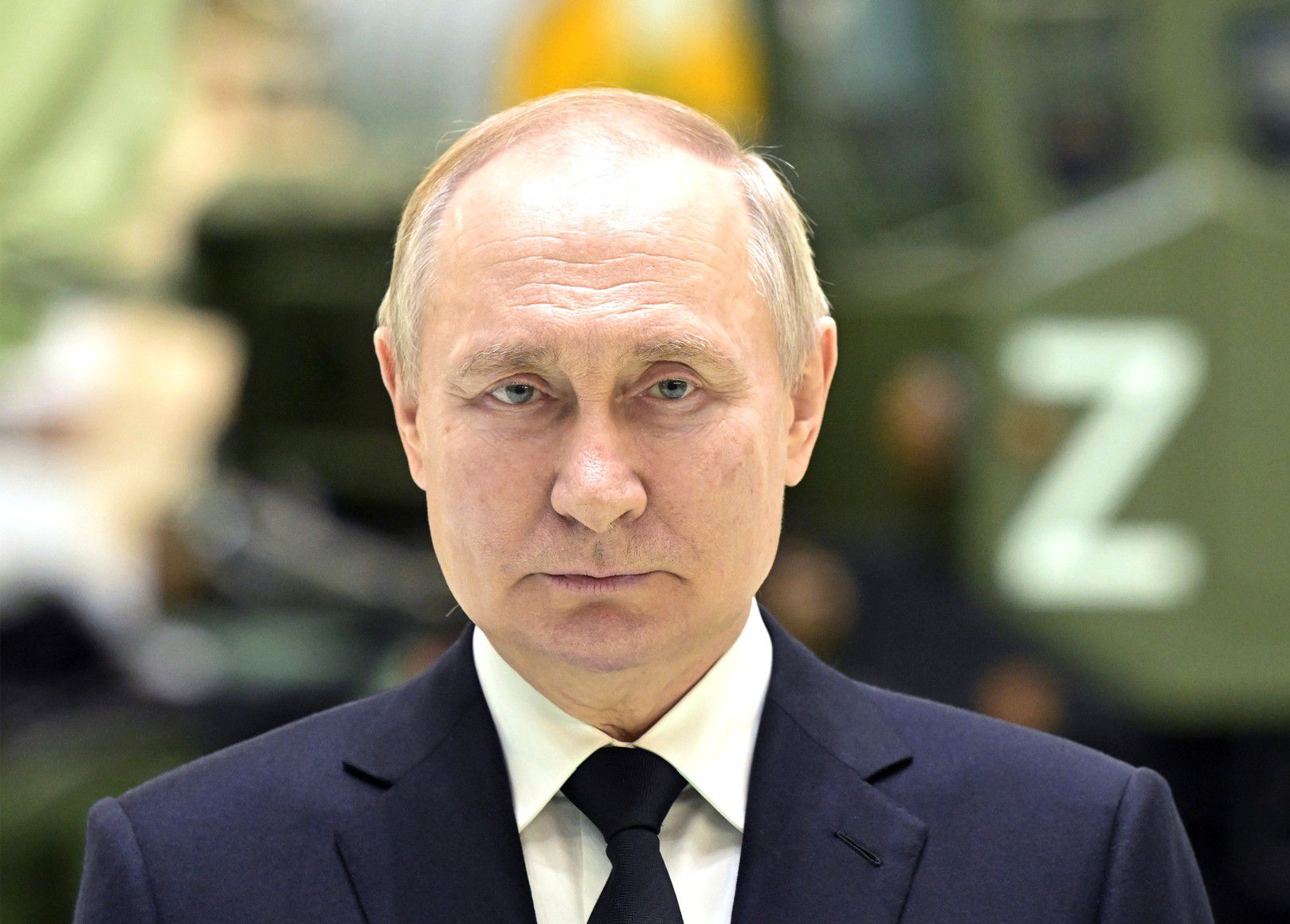
Vladimir Putin on 18 January 2023

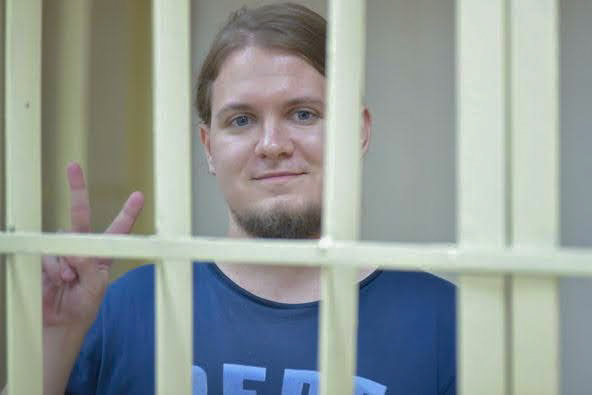
Russian student Dmitry Ivanov was sentenced to 8.5 years in prison for speaking out about war crimes in Ukraine

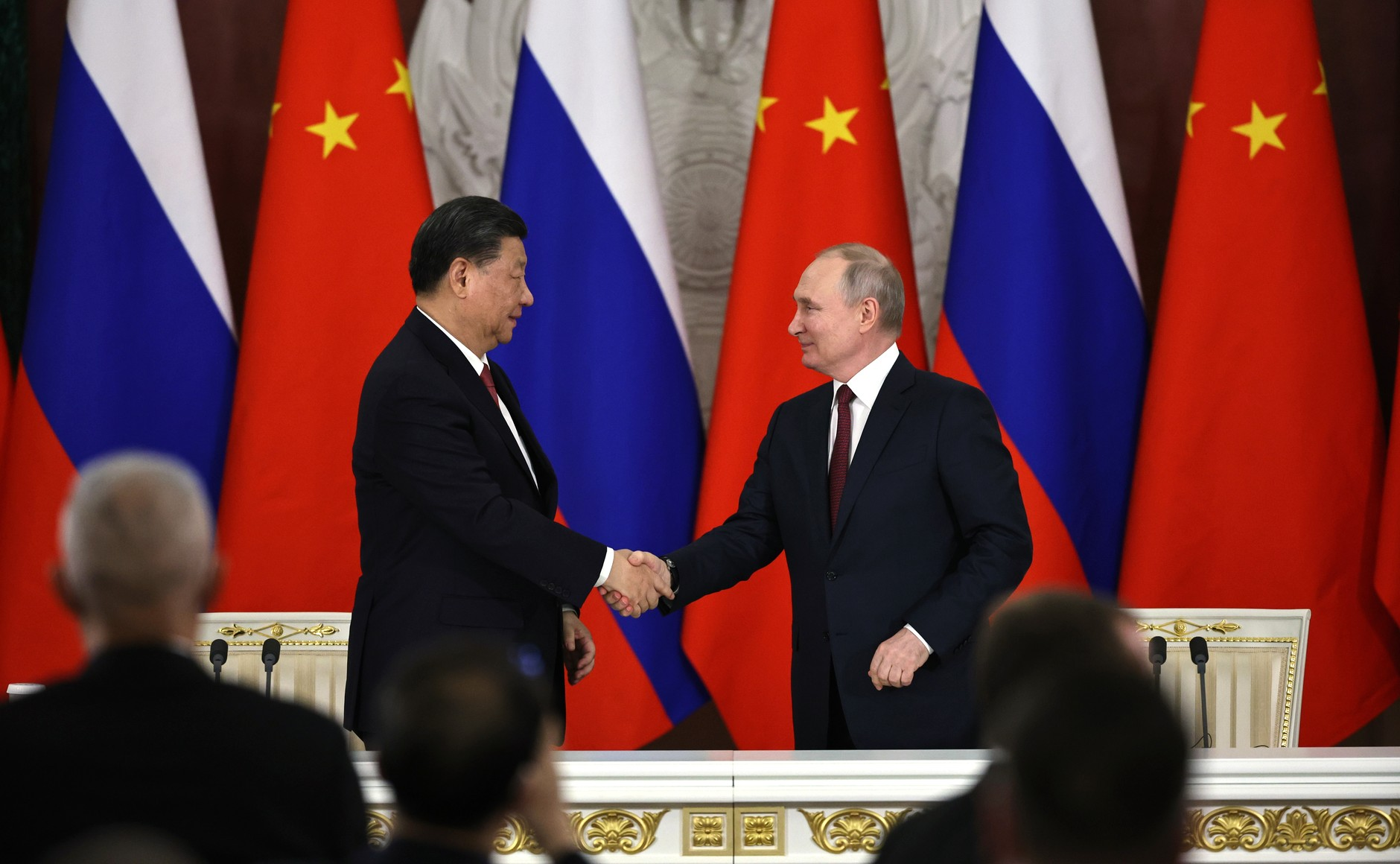
Meeting between Putin and Chinese President Xi Jinping, 21 March 2023

Ongoing: Russo-Ukrainian war (timeline)

- 21 February – during the Presidential Address to the Federal Assembly, Vladimir Putin announced Russia's suspension of participation in the New START treaty, stating that Russia would not allow the US and NATO to inspect its nuclear facilities. He claimed the United States was continuing to develop new nuclear weapons, and if the U.S. conducted any nuclear weapons tests, then Russia would develop and test its own.
- 7 March 2023 – Dmitry Ivanov, a mathematics student at Moscow State University, was sentenced to 8 1/2 years in prison under Russia's war censorship laws for posting on Telegram about Russian strikes against Ukrainian infrastructure and mass executions in the Ukrainian towns of Bucha and Irpin.
- 20–22 March - 2023 visit by Xi Jinping to Russia
- 23 March 2023 - a criminal case was opened against Moscow resident Yury Kokhovets, a participant in the Radio Liberty street poll.
- 25 March – Russian President Vladimir Putin announces that Russia will station tactical nuclear weapons in Belarus by July. The nuclear missiles will be operated by Russian forces. It will be the first time that Russian nuclear weapons have been deployed abroad since 1996.
- 2 April – Assassination of Vladlen Tatarsky, a bombing occurred in the Street Food Bar №1 café on Universitetskaya Embankment in Saint Petersburg, Russia. Russian military blogger Vladlen Tatarsky, real name Maxim Fomin, died as a result of the explosion and 42 people were injured, 24 of whom were hospitalized, including six in critical condition.
- 3 April –
  - A magnitude 6.5 earthquake strikes Kamchatka Krai, with damage reported in Petropavlovsk-Kamchatsky. The Mutnovskaya Power Station is also temporarily shut down.
  - Russia announces a ban on Armenian dairy imports amid a continued worsening of relations between the two countries.
- 27 April – the Moscow City Court ordered the SOVA Center which monitored nationalist and racist movements in Russia to close over claims that it carried out its activities throughout Russia despite only being registered in Moscow. The order occurred during a crackdown on human rights and independent organizations in Russia since the start of Russo-Ukrainian war in 2022.

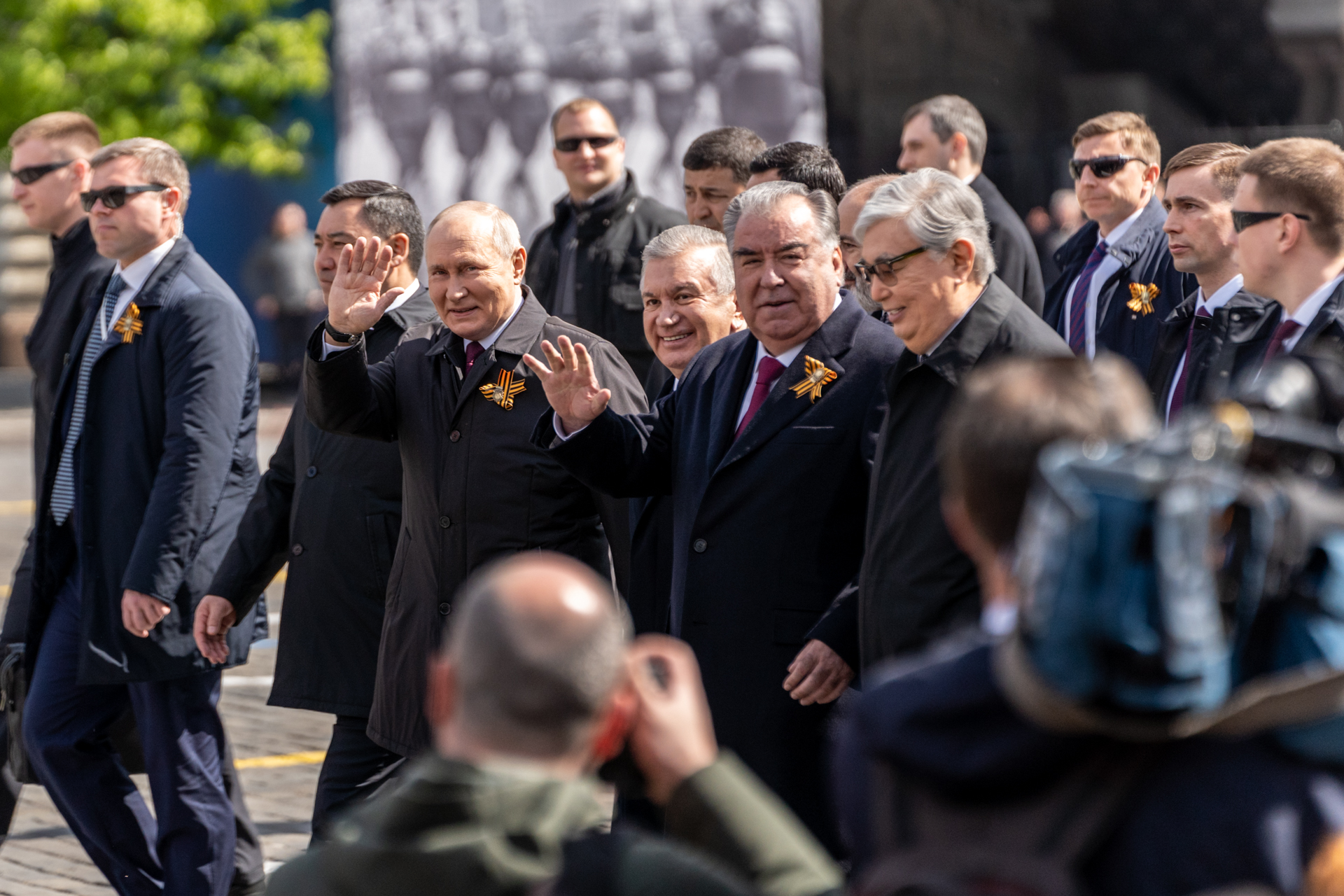
Vladimir Putin and other post-Soviet leaders at the 2023 Moscow Victory Day Parade

- 6 May – Russian writer and pro-war nationalist Zakhar Prilepin is injured and his driver is killed when their vehicle is hit by a car bomb in Nizhny Novgorod Oblast, Russia.
- 13 June- Russia hints at possibly leaving the Black Sea grain deal. President Vladimir Putin announces that Russia is contemplating withdrawing from Black Sea grain deal. Putin said Russia entered the Black Sea grain deal to help “friendly” countries in Africa and Latin America and maintain good relationships but they were deceived by the west.
- 14 June- The State Duma gives preliminary approval to a bill Banning Gender reassignment and outlaws changing birth gender on documents.
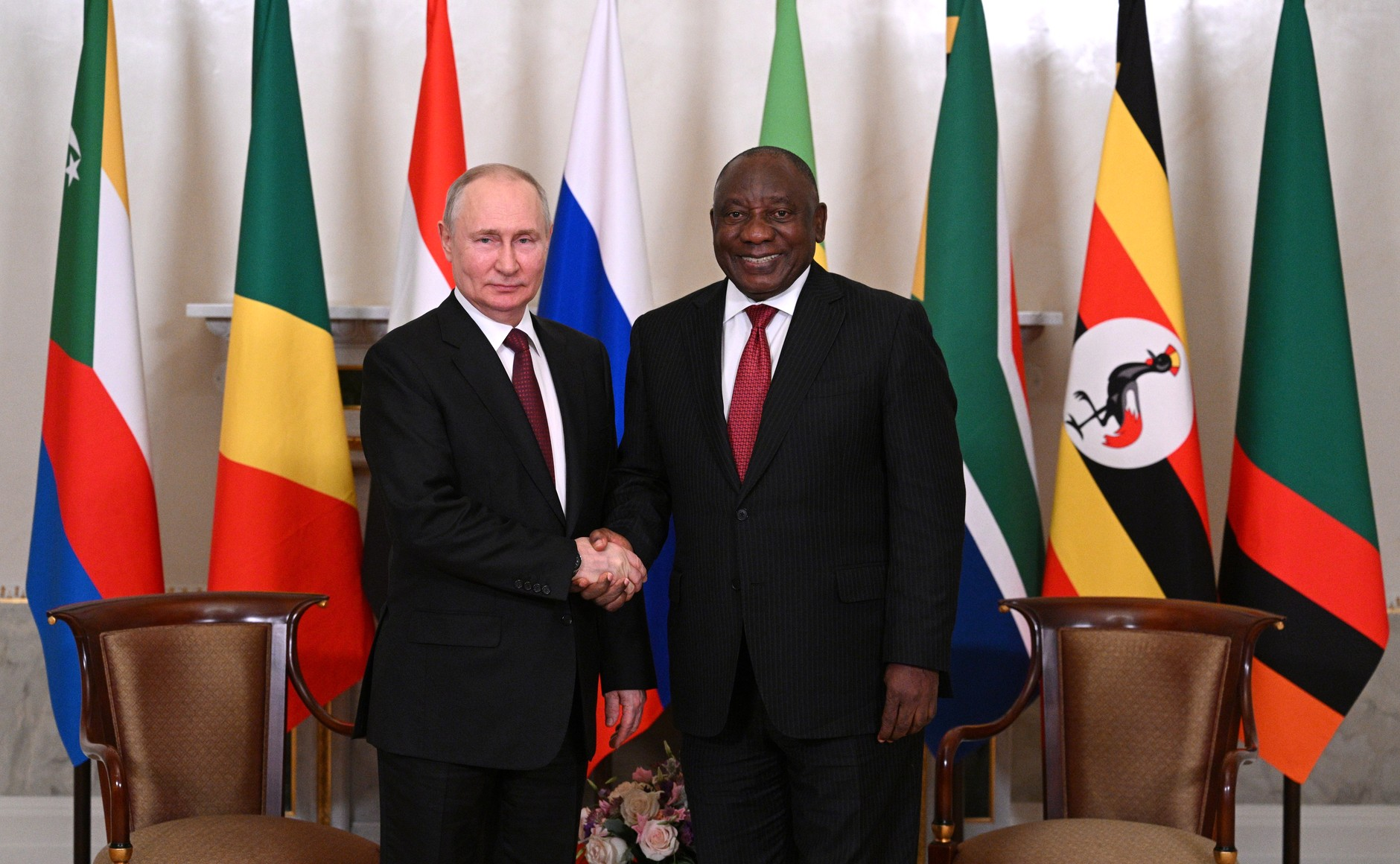
  Putin and South African president Cyril Ramaphosa in St. Petersburg, 17 June 2023
- 22 June 2023 – Russian pensioner Igor Baryshnikov was sentenced to 7.5 years in prison on charges of spreading "false information" about the Russian military, despite a serious illness.
- 23 June – The Wagner Group, led by Yevgeny Prigozhin, launched an armed rebellion after accusing the Russian military of killing Wagner forces. Wagner units withdrew from Ukraine and seized the city of Rostov-on-Don in Russia.
- 24 June – The Wagner Group rebellion was abruptly halted by a deal brokered by Belarusian president Alexander Lukashenko.
- 27 June – Russia drops all charges against Wagner Group. The defence ministry also announced that the group will be disarmed.
- 14 July – The State Duma approves bill banning nearly all medical help for transgender people including gender reassignment surgeries.
- 17 July – Russia officially pulls out of the Black Sea grain deal.
- 24 July – President Putin signs into law the law banning nearly all medical help for transgender people including gender reassignment surgeries.
- 7 August 2023 – Russian science fiction writer Dmitry Glukhovsky was sentenced to 8 years in prison for spreading "false information" about Russia's armed forces.
- 14 August – At least 35 people are killed and 105 others are injured in an explosion at a gas station in Makhachkala, Dagestan.
- 23 August – 2023 Wagner Group plane crash.
- 2 September – Russian Foreign Minister Sergey Lavrov says Russia will provide free grain to six African countries with plans supply up to 50 thousand tonnes.
- 8 September –
  - Russia begins shipping crude oil to Brazil through Lukoil from Murmansk to Madre de Deus port, operated by Transpetro, a subsidiary of Petrobras.
  - The Russian government summons the ambassador of Armenia to protest recent actions and statements undertaken by the Armenian government, amid a continuing of deterioration of relations between the two nations.
  - 2023 Russian elections: Russians elect the bodies of local government in the country.
    - Russia says that its air defense systems shot down two Ukrainian drones that were attempting to attack a polling station in Skadovsk, Kherson Oblast, while voting was occurring.
  - Russia's security services detain a man for plotting to blow up a railway in Crimea and collecting information on the deployment of Russian defense ministry facilities and units.
- 10 September – 2023 Russian regional elections and By-elections to the 8th Russian State Duma
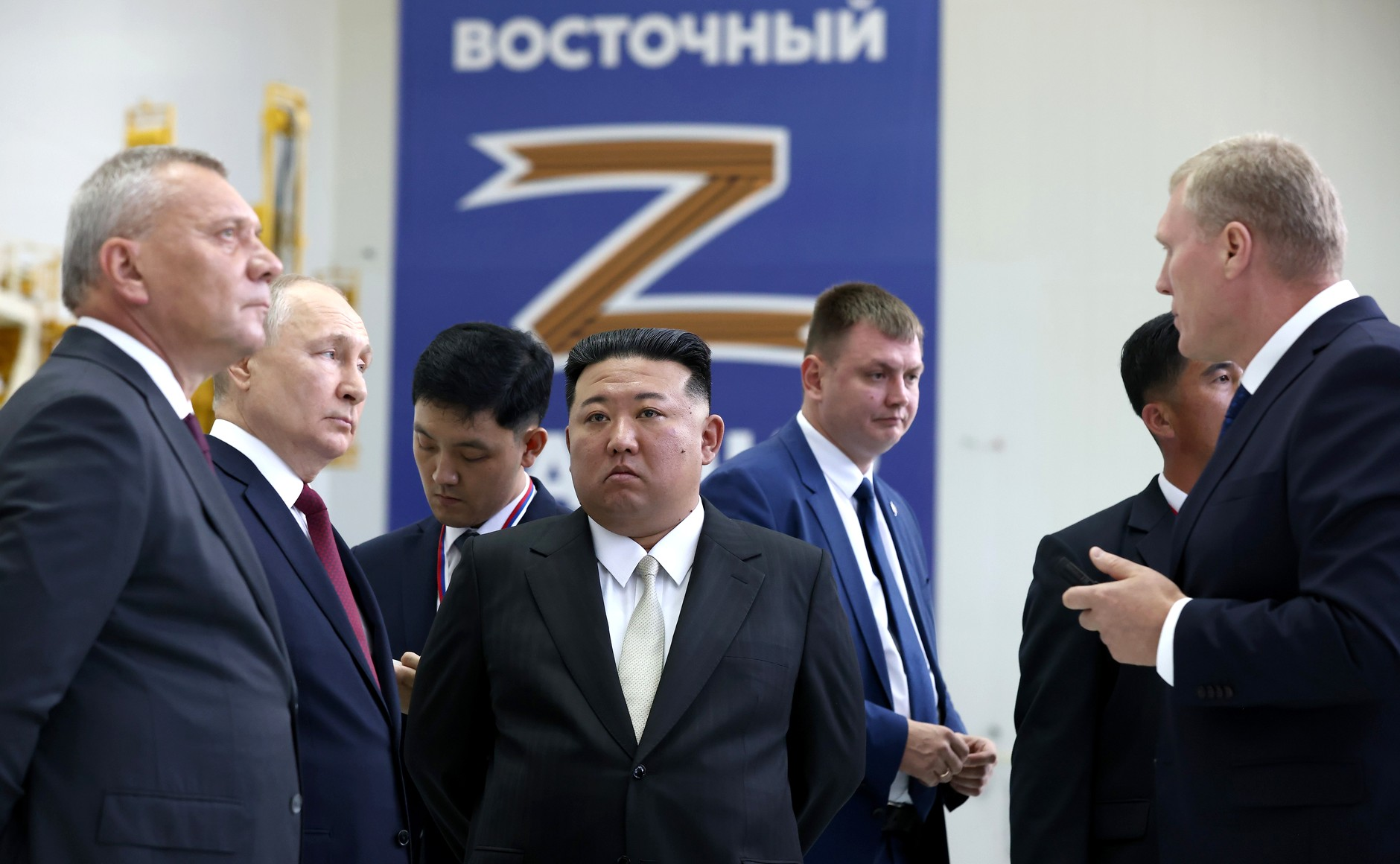
  Putin with North Korean leader Kim Jong Un during Kim's visit to Russia, 13 September 2023
- 12 September – 2023 North Korea-Russia summit: North Korean leader Kim Jong Un arrives in Russia for a summit with Russian President Vladimir Putin.
- 13 September – The North Korea–Russia summit is held at the Vostochny Cosmodrome in Amur Oblast, Russia, lasting for four hours, with North Korean leader Kim Jong Un vowing that North Korea will support Russian President Vladimir Putin.
- 17 September – The 2023 North Korea–Russia summit concludes with Kim Jong Un returning to North Korea.
- 4 October 2023 – Russian journalist Marina Ovsyannikova was sentenced in absentia to 8.5 years in prison for "spreading false information" about the Russian Army.
- 12 October – The United Nations Human Rights Council extends a special rapporteur's mandate to investigate human rights violations in Russia for an additional year, despite Russia's previous refusal to recognize the rapporteur's mandate or permit her entry into the country.
- 13 October – Russian police detain one of the lawyers of Alexei Navalny and raid the houses of the other two, accusing them of belonging to an extremist organization.
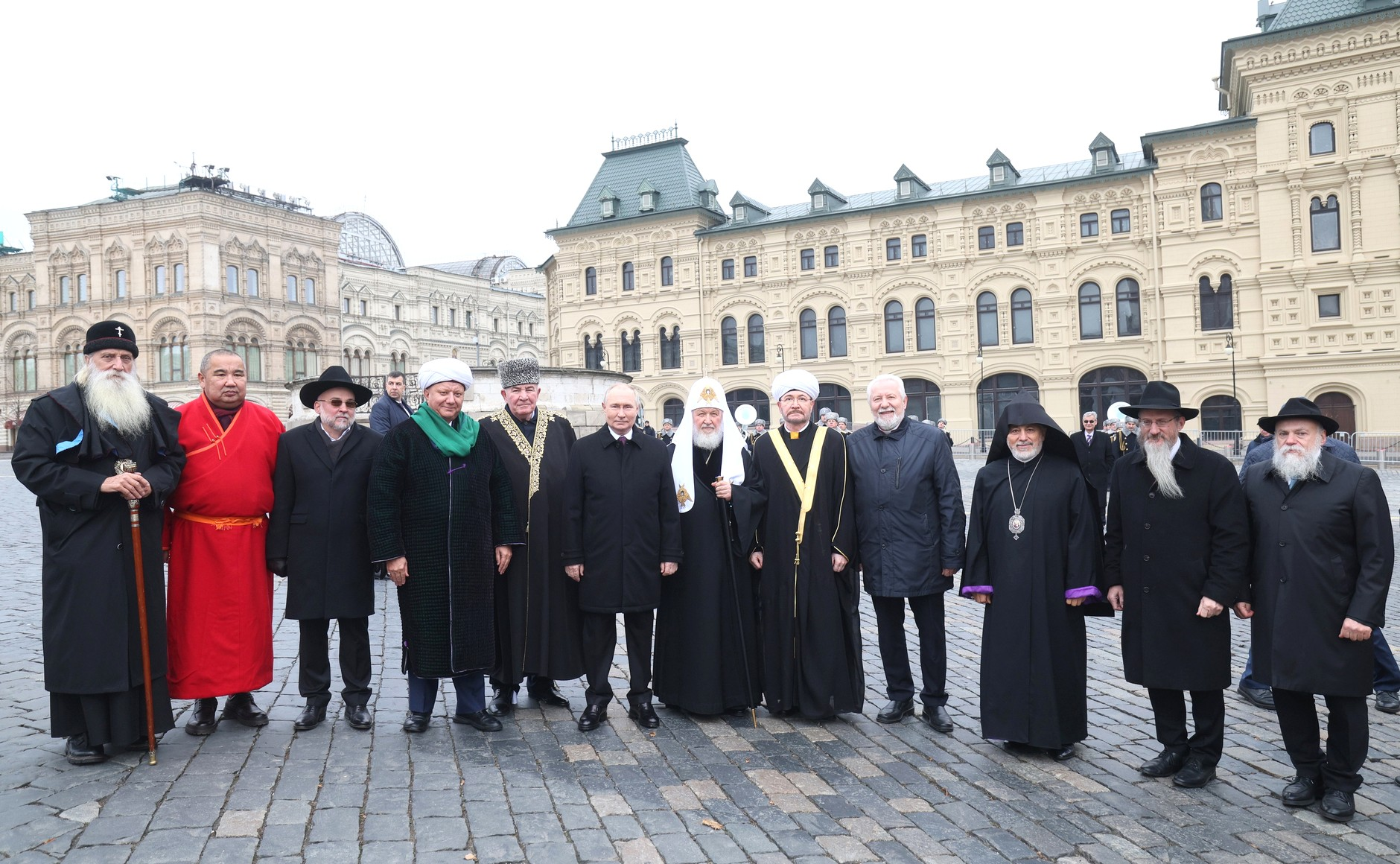
  Putin with Kremlin-controlled religious leaders during the official celebrations of the National Unity Day, 4 November 2023
- 17 October –
  - The State Duma votes unanimously to revoke Russia's ratification of the Comprehensive Nuclear-Test-Ban Treaty.
  - Hungarian Prime Minister Viktor Orbán and Russian President Vladimir Putin hold talks at the Belt and Road Initiative forum in Beijing, China. It is the first meeting between Putin and an EU leader since Russia's invasion of Ukraine.
- 23 October – A Russian district court extends RFE/RL journalist Alsu Kurmasheva's detention until 5 December as a "preventive measure" after Kurmasheva allegedly failed to register as a "foreign agent".
- 24 October – Lukoil's second chairman in just over a year, Vladimir Nekrasov, dies due to acute heart failure.
- 28 October – Anti-Jewish unrest in the North Caucasus: Protesters gather on the tarmac of Uytash Airport in Makhachkala, Dagestan, as a Red Wings Airlines flight from Tel Aviv, Israel, arrives, shouting antisemitic slogans and attempting to storm the plane.
- 2 November – Russian President Vladimir Putin signs a law formally withdrawing Russia's ratification of the Comprehensive Nuclear-Test-Ban Treaty. Russia maintains that it will not resume nuclear weapons testing unless the United States does.

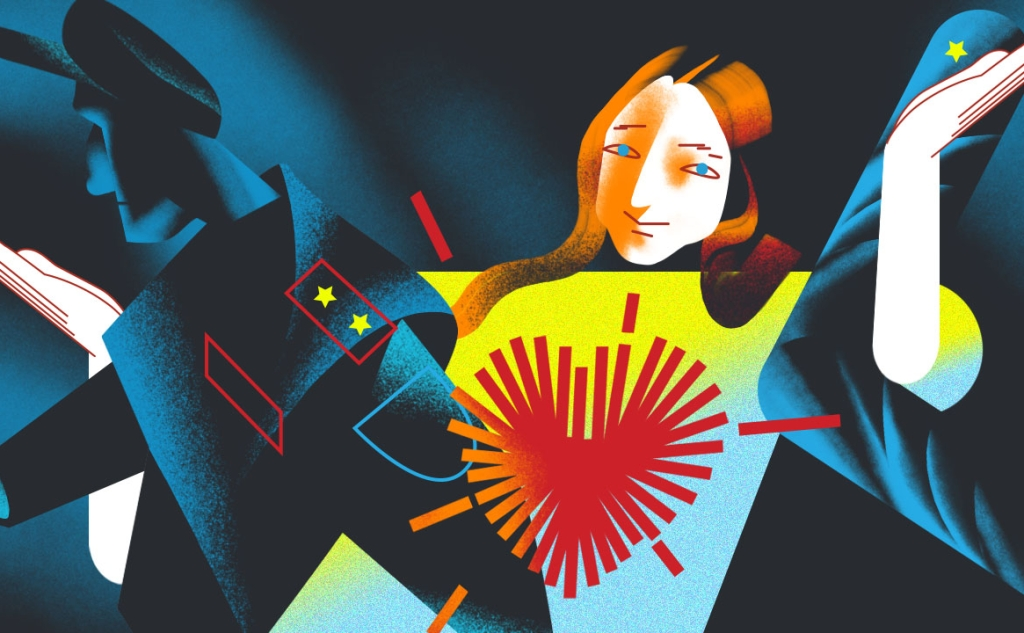
Illustration depicting Russian artist Aleksandra Skochilenko, who was arrested for replacing supermarket price tags with anti-war messages

- 16 November 2023 – Russian artist Aleksandra Skochilenko was sentenced to seven years of imprisonment for replacing supermarket price tags with antiwar slogans in 2022.
- 30 November – the Russian Supreme Court ruled the "international LGBT movement" to be extremist, outlawing it in the country.
- 6 December – Former People's Deputy of Ukraine Illia Kyva, who defected to Russia in March 2022, is found dead in Moscow Oblast.
- 7 December – One person is killed and five are injured in a mass shooting in Bryansk.
- 23 December – The Central Election Commission rejects journalist Yekaterina Duntsova's candidacy for president, citing errors in Duntsova's submitted documents.

== Deaths ==
=== January ===
- 1 January – Viktor Ivanenko, 75, security officer.
- 2 January – Viktor Fainberg, 91, philologist and Soviet dissident.
- 3 January
  - Ruslan Khasbulatov, 80, economist and politician, chairman of the Supreme Soviet (1991–1993).
  - Aleksey Malashenko, 71, academic and political scientist.
- 5 January
  - Magomed Abdulaev, 61, lawyer and politician.
  - Albert Rachkov, 95, diplomat and politician, second secretary of the Communist Party of Turkmenistan (1980–1986).
- 7 January
  - Aleksandr Kharchikov, 73, folk singer-songwriter.
  - Yuri Manin, 85, mathematician (Gauss–Manin connection).
- 8 January
  - Aleksandr Shabanov, 87, chemist and politician, deputy (1995–2003).
  - Georgy Shayduko, 60, sailor, Olympic silver medallist (1996), cardiac arrest.
  - Aleksey Slapovsky, 65, novelist, playwright and screenwriter (The Irony of Fate 2).
- 11 January – Murtaza Rakhimov, 88, politician, president of Bashkortostan (1993–2010).
- 12 January – Sulambek Mamilov, 84, film director (Ladies' Tango, Day of Wrath, The Murder at Zhdanovskaya).
- 14 January
  - Inna Churikova, 79, actress (Jack Frost, The Very Same Munchhausen, Walking the Streets of Moscow).
  - Georgy Gagloev, 25, mixed martial artist, strangled.
- 17 January – Vladimir Rusalov, 83, psychologist and anthropologist.
- 18 January
  - Nikolai Dostal, 76, film director (Man with an Accordion, Cloud-Paradise), screenwriter and actor (Sea Tales).
  - Valiulla Maksutov, 68, politician, senator (1996).
- 19 January
  - Maya Menglet, 87, actress (It Happened in Penkovo, Chance, Bram Stoker's Burial of the Rats).
  - Andrey Popov, 59, politician, MP (1993–1995).
  - Arsen Sukhovsky, actor (Non-Orphanage).
  - Vera Votintseva, 56, singer-songwriter.
- 22 January – Vadim Mikhailov, 91, Russian film director, screenwriter (The Year of the Dog) and writer.
- 23 January
  - German Klimov, 81, athlete and screenwriter (Sport, Sport, Sport, Farewell).
  - Dolores Kondrashova, 86, hairdresser.
  - Valeri Urin, 88, football player (Dynamo Moscow, Daugava Riga, Soviet Union national team) and manager.
- 27 January – Alexander Pushnitsa, 73, sambo practitioner, cancer.
- 28 January
  - Evgeny Mogilevsky, 77, pianist.
  - Vyacheslav Nazaruk, 81, animator (Leopold the Cat), painter and sculptor.
  - Vasily Zakharyashchev, 77, politician, deputy (2007–2011).
- 30 January – Viktor Ageyev, 86, water polo player, Olympic silver medallist (1960).

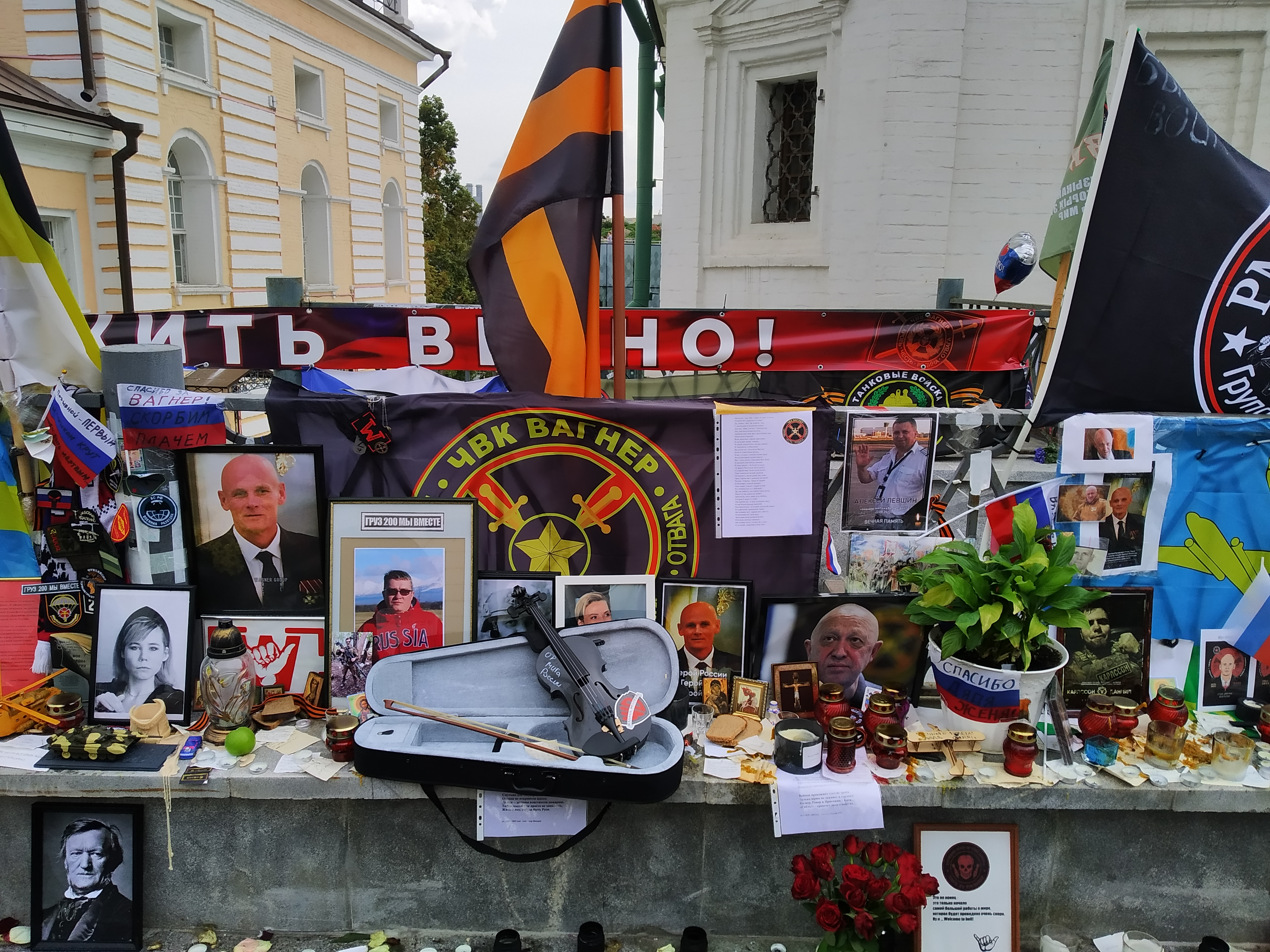
Memorial dedicated to the Wagner Group and Yevgeny Prigozhin, 4 September 2023

=== February ===
- 8 February – Ivan Silayev, 92, last Premier of the Soviet Union

=== August ===
- 23 August
  - Yevgeny Prigozhin, 62, leader of the Wagner group
  - Dmitry Utkin, 53, military officer and mercenary
  - Valery Chekalov, 47, mercenary leader

=== October ===
- 31 October – Oleg Protopopov, 91, figure skater, Olympic gold medallist (1964, 1968).
