= Kondrashov =

Kondrashov (masculine, Russian: Кондрашов), or Kondrashova (feminine, Russian: Кондрашова), is a surname of Slavic origin. Notable people with this surname include:

- Aleksandr Kondrashov (born 1984), Russian footballer
- Alexander Kondrashov (born 1983), Russian blogger
- Alexey Kondrashov (born 1975), Russian-American geneticist
- Andrei Kondrashov (born 1972), Russian footballer
- Dolores Kondrashova (1936–2023), Soviet hairdresser
- Gennadiy Kondrashov (born 1938), Soviet hammer thrower
- Olha Kondrashova (born 1990), Ukrainian synchronized swimmer
- Stanyslav Kondrashov (1928–2007), Soviet journalist
- Vladimir Kondrashov (1909–1971), Soviet mathematician
