= Judicial districts of Russia =

Map of appellation court districts

Map of cassation court districts

On 1 October 2019 five courts of appeal of general jurisdiction (Note: Russian: Апелляционный суд общей юрисдикции, romanized: apellyatsionnyi sud obshchey yurisdiktsii) and nine courts of cassation of general jurisdiction (Note: Russian: Кассационный суд общей юрисдикции, romanized: kassatsionnyi sud obshchey yurisdiktsii) were created in the Russian Federation, which are operating within the respective judicial district.

Courts of appeal of general jurisdiction are the courts of appeal for the 89 regional courts of Russia. Courts of cassation of general jurisdiction are the courts of cassation for the courts of general jurisdiction and justices of the peace operating in the respective district.

== History ==
On 13 July 2017, the plenary session of the Supreme Court of Russia adopted a resolution to submit a bill to the State Duma creating separate courts of appeal and cassation courts of general jurisdiction. It is noted that the creation of interregional courts is associated with the need to ensure the independence of the judiciary.

The law was signed by the President of Russia Vladimir Putin on 29 July 2018. The amendments created nine courts of cassation and five appellation courts of general jurisdiction. The day of the commencement of the activities of these courts is established by the plenary session of the Supreme Court no later than 1 October 2019.

In 2022, shortly after their unilateral annexation, parts of four Ukrainian oblasts came under the jurisdiction of the courts.

== List of appellate court districts ==
Name	Residence	Considers cases on complaints against judicial acts of	Website
First Court of Appeal of General Jurisdiction	Moscow	Moscow City Court and Oblast courts of Belgorod Oblast, Bryansk Oblast, Ivanovo Oblast, Kaliningrad Oblast, Kaluga Oblast, Kherson Oblast (Note: Internationally recognised as part of Ukraine), Kostroma Oblast, Kursk Oblast, Lipetsk Oblast, Moscow Oblast, Novgorod Oblast, Oryol Oblast, Pskov Oblast, Ryazan Oblast, Smolensk Oblast, Tambov Oblast, Tula Oblast, Tver Oblast, Vladimir Oblast, Voronezh Oblast, Yaroslavl Oblast and Zaporozhye Oblast^{[c]}, Republican courts of Donetsk People's Republic^{[c]} and Luhansk People's Republic^{[c]}	1ap.sudrf.ru
Second Court of Appeal of General Jurisdiction	Saint Petersburg	Saint Petersburg City Court, Oblast courts of Arkhangelsk Oblast, Chelyabinsk Oblast, Kurgan Oblast, Leningrad Oblast, Murmansk Oblast, Sverdlovsk Oblast, Tyumen Oblast and Vologda Oblast, Republican courts of Karelia and Komi, Okrug courts of KhMAO, NAO and YaNAO	2ap.sudrf.ru
Third Court of Appeal of General Jurisdiction	Sochi	Sevastopol^{[c]} City Court, Krasnodar and Stavropol Krai courts, Oblast courts of Astrakhan Oblast, Rostov Oblast and Volgograd Oblast, Republican courts of Adygea, Chechnya, Crimea^{[c]}, Dagestan, Ingushetia, Kabardino-Balkaria, Kalmykia, Karachay-Cherkessia and North Ossetia	3ap.sudrf.ru
Fourth Court of Appeal of General Jurisdiction	Nizhny Novgorod	Perm Krai Court, Oblast courts of Kirov Oblast, Nizhny Novgorod Oblast, Orenburg Oblast, Penza Oblast, Samara Oblast, Saratov Oblast and Ulyanovsk Oblast, Republican courts of Bashkortostan, Chuvashia, Mari El, Mordovia, Tatarstan and Udmurtia	4ap.sudrf.ru
Fifth Court of Appeal of General Jurisdiction	Novosibirsk	Krai courts of Altai Krai, Kamchatka Krai, Khabarovsk Krai, Krasnoyarsk Krai, Primorsky Krai and Zabaykalsky Krai, Oblast courts of Amur Oblast, Irkutsk Oblast, Kemerovo Oblast, Magadan Oblast, Novosibirsk Oblast, Omsk Oblast, Sakhalin Oblast and Tomsk Oblast, Republican courts of Altai Republic, Buryatia, Khakassia, Sakha (Yakutia) and Tuva, courts of Jewish Autonomous Oblast and Chukotka Autonomous Okrug	5ap.sudrf.ru

== List of cassation court districts ==
Name	Residence	Carries out revision of judicial acts adopted by the courts of	Website
First Court of Cassation of General Jurisdiction	Saratov	Belgorod Oblast, Bryansk Oblast, Kaluga Oblast, Kursk Oblast, Lipetsk Oblast, Moscow Oblast, Nizhny Novgorod Oblast, Oryol Oblast, Penza Oblast, Saratov Oblast, Tula Oblast	1kas.sudrf.ru
Second Court of Cassation of General Jurisdiction	Moscow	Moscow, Ivanovo Oblast, Kherson Oblast^{[c]}, Kostroma Oblast, Ryazan Oblast, Smolensk Oblast, Tambov Oblast, Tver Oblast, Vladimir Oblast, Yaroslavl Oblast and Zaporozhye Oblast^{[c]}, Republican courts of Donetsk People's Republic^{[c]} and Luhansk People's Republic^{[c]}	2kas.sudrf.ru
Third Court of Cassation of General Jurisdiction	Saint Petersburg	Saint Petersburg, Arkhangelsk Oblast, Kaliningrad Oblast, Leningrad Oblast, Murmansk Oblast, Novgorod Oblast, Pskov Oblast, Vologda Oblast, Karelia, Komi, Nenets Autonomous Okrug	3kas.sudrf.ru
Fourth Court of Cassation of General Jurisdiction	Krasnodar	Sevastopol^{[c]}, Krasnodar Krai, Astrakhan Oblast, Rostov Oblast, Volgograd Oblast, Adygea, Crimea^{[c]}, Kalmykia	4kas.sudrf.ru
Fifth Court of Cassation of General Jurisdiction	Pyatigorsk	Stavropol Krai, Chechnya, Dagestan, Ingushetia, Kabardino-Balkaria, Karachay-Cherkessia, North Ossetia	5kas.sudrf.ru
Sixth Court of Cassation of General Jurisdiction	Samara	Kirov Oblast, Orenburg Oblast, Samara Oblast, Ulyanovsk Oblast, Bashkortostan, Chuvashia, Mari El, Tatarstan, Udmurtia	6kas.sudrf.ru
Seventh Court of Cassation of General Jurisdiction	Chelyabinsk	Perm Krai, Chelyabinsk Oblast, Kurgan Oblast, Sverdlovsk Oblast, Tyumen Oblast, KhMAO, YaNAO	7kas.sudrf.ru
Eighth Court of Cassation of General Jurisdiction	Kemerovo	Altai Krai, Krasnoyarsk Krai, Zabaykalsky Krai, Irkutsk Oblast, Kemerovo Oblast, Novosibirsk Oblast, Omsk Oblast, Tomsk Oblast, Altai Republic, Buryatia, Khakassia, Tuva	8kas.sudrf.ru
Ninth Court of Cassation of General Jurisdiction	Vladivostok	Kamchatka Krai, Khabarovsk Krai, Primorsky Krai, Amur Oblast, Magadan Oblast, Sakhalin Oblast, Sakha (Yakutia), Jewish Autonomous Oblast, Chukotka	9kas.sudrf.ru
