= Alexander Kondrashov =

Alexander Kondrashov may refer to:

- Aleksandr Kondrashov (born 1984), Russian football player
- Alexander Kondrashov (blogger) (born 1983), travel blogger
