= Aleksey Malashenko =

Russian academic and political scientist (1951–2023)

- Алексей Малашенко
- Born: Aleksey Vsevolodovich Malashenko; 2 February 1951; Moscow, Russian SFSR, USSR
- Died: 3 January 2023 (aged 71)
- Education: Institute of Asian and African Countries
- Occupations: Professor; Political scientist

Aleksey Vsevolodovich Malashenko (Russian: Алексе́й Все́володович Малаше́нко; 2 February 1951 – 3 January 2023) was a Russian academic and political scientist. He specialized in the oriental and Islamic studies. He was the son of actress Galina Novozhilova.

== Biography ==
Malashenko graduated from the Institute of Asian and African Countries in 1974 with a degree in history. In 1972, he studied in Egypt and Turkmenistan (USSR). From 1974 to 1976, he served in the Soviet Armed Forces in Algeria. He was a researcher at Institute of Oriental Studies of the Russian Academy of Sciences from 1976 to 1982. In 1978, he defended his dissertation on Islam in Algeria.

Malashenko was an editor at the journal Problems of Peace and Socialism from 1982 to 1986. In 1986, he became head of the religious department at the Institute of Oriental Studies of the Russian Academy of Sciences, where he was lead researcher from 1999 to 2001. In 1990, he was a visiting professor at Colgate University in the United States. From 2000 to 2006, he was a professor at the Moscow State Institute of International Relations before teaching at the Higher School of Economics from 2007 to 2008.

Malashenko was a member of the scientific council of the Carnegie Moscow Center from 2007 to 2016. In October 2016, he became head of scientific research at Dialogue of Civilizations. He was head of the expert council at RIA Novosti.

Malashenko spoke Russian, Arabic, English, and French and wrote and edited 18 books in those languages. He died on 3 January 2023 at the age of 71.

== Works in English ==
- The Soviet Union and the Muslim Nations (1988)
- The Last Red August (1993)
- Islam in Central Asia (1994)
