= Valiulla Maksutov =

Russian politician (1954–2023)

- Валиулла Максутов

Member of the Federation Council of Russia
- In office 17 July 1996 – 13 November 1996

Personal details
- Born: Valiulla Safiullovich Maksutov; 18 September 1954 Pokhvistnevo, Kuybyshev Oblast, Russian SFSR, USSR
- Died: 18 January 2023 (aged 68) Moscow, Russia

Valiulla Safiullovich Maksutov (Russian: Валиулла Сафиуллович Максутов; 18 September 1954 – 18 January 2023) was a Russian politician. He served in the Federation Council from July to November 1996.

Maksutov died in Moscow on 18 January 2023, at the age of 68.
