= Georgy Gagloev =

Russian mixed martial artist (died 2023)

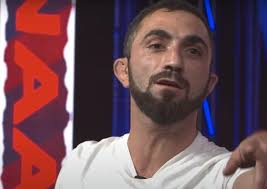
- Born: Georgy Gagloev; 1997/1998; Beslan, North Ossetia, Russia
- Died: 14 January 2023 (aged 25); Russia
- Nationality: Ossetian

Georgy Gagloev (Russian: Георгий Гаглоев; 1997/1998 – 14 January 2023) was a Russian mixed martial artist. Participant of international and all-Russian sports competitions. Master of sports of international class in MMA. He left professional sports in the MMA pop industry.

== Biography ==
Georgy Gagloev was born in the Russian Republic of North Ossetia, the city of Beslan.

Gagloev fought in the promotions "Наше Дело", "Hype Fighting" and "Arena".

== Death ==
On 14 January 2023, Gagloev was found dead on the upper couchette shelf of a train. The body was removed from the train and was sent to the morgue to study the cause of death. He was 25.

There are many versions in the media about the sudden death of Gagloev. According to the original version, he was strangled with a pillow. According to the preliminary version, the cause of death was pulmonary embolism, accompanying natural death. The exact cause of death is currently being determined.

The head of the Investigative Committee of Russia Alexander Bastrykin demanded to report on the investigation into the death of Gagloev and took what was happening under his personal control.

== Sports achievements ==
- 2020 — FCF MMA Full Contact Fighting Tournament Winner (Kislovodsk, gold)
- 2020 — Championship of the Armed Forces of St. Petersburg (Russia, judo, gold)
- 2016 — Traditional open sambo tournament "Golden Autumn" (won the title of winner at the St. Petersburg Sambo Championship among men)
- 2019 — International tournament TIME TO FIGHT
- 2019 — «Croatia Open»
