= Dialogue of Civilizations =

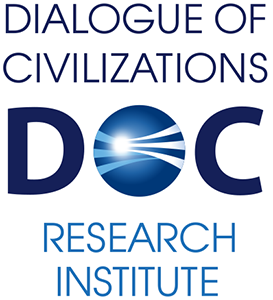
- Official language: Russian

The Dialogue of Civilizations Research Institute is an independent think tank. Its headquarters is located in Berlin, with representative offices located in Moscow and Vienna. The institute carries out research into issues concerning international relations and international security. The subjects at the forefront of the Institute's activities are East and West, and issues related to the war against terrorism, infrastructure development, the search for alternative models for economic development, and the preservation of human values. Employed in the institute's research activities is the so-called "Index of Dialogue" which enables the propensity towards conflict in any given area to be assessed, including the risk of it escalating to the "hotspot" stage.

== History ==
On 9 November 2001, prompted by the Iranian President Mohammad Khatami, the member states of UNESCO unanimously adopted the "UNESCO Universal Declaration on Cultural Diversity". The UN's General Assembly ratified the "Global Agenda for Dialogue Among Civilizations" in which were enshrined the principles of intercultural dialogue, which all were encouraged to defend, as well as those aims set out to be achieved. It was for the implementation of this initiative in practice that the forum "Dialogue of Civilizations" was created. In 2002, members of the public from three countries - Russia, India, and Greece - initiated the "Dialogue of Civilizations" international programme. The co-founders became the Indian entrepreneur and futurologist Jagdish Kapur (1920-2010), the American businessman of Greek origin Nicholas F. S. Papanicolaou, and Vladimir Yakunin.

The first session of the forum took place in September 2003 on the island of Rhodes in Greece. It was conducted in difficult international political conditions, against the backdrop of the Iraq War, perceived by a host of countries as being a war between the Christian and Muslim worlds. Participants came to the conclusion that mutual understanding between the representatives of the globe's different civilisations leaves a lot to be desired. The Rhodes Declaration "Dialogue of Civilization for a Humane Order" was adopted in which there was a plea to maintain the conversation on the destinies of humankind, as well as an expression of the ambition to make such public dialogue a substantive factor in international cooperation. After the declaration was adopted, a network society of advocates of dialogue began to take shape. Since 2003, the Rhodes Forum has been convening every year in the conference; these conferences have been instrumental in the creation of an international network of experts.

On 10 November 2008, in Hofburg under the patronage of UNESCO and with the participation of the Austrian chancellor Alfred Gusenbauer, the WPF "Dialogue of Civilizations" summit took place; a meeting of around 40 experts, politicians and public figures from various countries. Centre of attention were the problems of sociocultural development in the modern world, the role of Russia in a multipolar world, and the prospects for strategic partnership between the European Union and Russia. Participants discussed the problems brought about by globalisation, and, in particular, those fuelled by the burgeoning global economic crisis.

The institute was founded in mid-2016, its founders are: Walter Schwimmer, former secretary general of the Council of Europe (1999-2004), and deputy chairman of the DOC Research Institute supervisory board; Peter W. Schulze, professor at the Political Science Department, Georg-August University of Göttingen; and, Vladimir Yakunin, chairman of the DOC Research Institute supervisory board, head of the State Governance Department Faculty of Political Sciences, Moscow State University, and doctor of political science.

== The Rhodes Forum ==
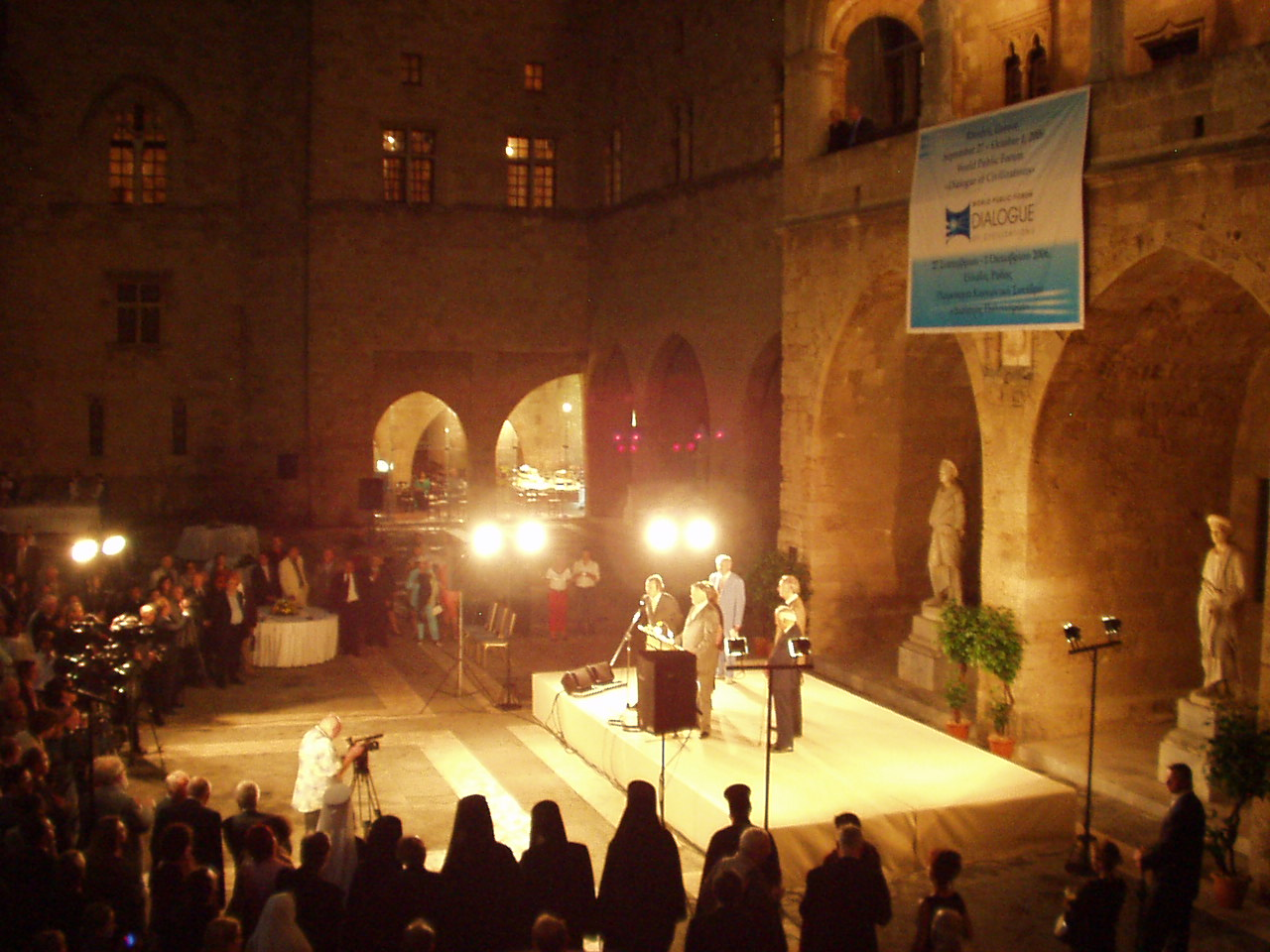
The Rhodes Forum in 2006

Since 2016, the Rhodes Forum has been an annual event conducted by the DOC Research Institute. Currently, taking part in the forum's activities are representatives of international NGOs, the world's media, and research centres of North and South America, Europe, and Asia. The Financial Times remarked that despite the expectation of witnessing a festival of pro-Kremlin propaganda, the Rhodes Forum looks like any other international conference and gives the impression of being like a mini Davos. The 2016 forum gathered about 300 analysts, businessmen and politicians. Among the participants were Eurosceptics, current president of the Czech Republic Miloš Zeman (who has appeared at the forum on 9 occasions) and the ex-president Václav Klaus, and former head of the IMF Dominique Strauss-Kahn. Centre of discussion were the problems of mass migration, Islamist terrorism, and the increase in social inequality in the world. At the 2016 Rhodes Forum conference the thought was also aired that the aim of the Institute was "to challenge the dominance of "Anglo-Saxon" analytical centres".

In 2017, the theme of the forum was expressed as "Multipolarity and dialogue in global and regional developments: imagining possible futures". A large part of the forum's programme was given over to the development of the African continent. Attending and speaking at the forum were the president of Mali (2012 - 2013) Dioncounda Traoré and the president of Nigeria (2010 - 2015) Goodluck Jonathan. Taking the stage, the Nigerian president remarked that the United Nations needed to change.

“For the world to experience sustainable peace, effective leadership must come from the UN, the flagship of global organisations. The UN that would inspire this kind of leadership should ensure equity, with leading nations and power centres representing different regions of the world, sitting at the Security Council as permanent members. The UN dialogue method must, therefore, change. The Security Council of the United Nations must be democratised, in view of new global realities, in the interest of peace.”

Another topic became the development of high technology and economy digitalisation. Taking part in the discussions on this subject were experts such as President of InfoWatch Group Natalya Kaspersky and Rob van Kranenburg, Co-Founder of Bricolabs and the Founder of Council, at the largest independent #IoT Thinktank.

In 2018, the Rhodes Forum took place on 5–6 October. Its topic was "Making multilateralism work: enhancing dialogue on peace, security and development". The following individuals took part in the Forum's work:

- Prime Minister of Guinea Ibrahima Kassory Fofana
- Special representative of the president of Russia for the Middle East and Africa, Deputy Foreign Minister of Russia Mikhail Bogdanov
- President of Mali (2012-2013) Dioncounda Traoré
- Foreign minister and vice chancellor of Germany (1998 - 2005) Joschka Fischer
- Prime Minister of Israel (2006-2008) Ehud Olmert,
- Alternate minister of foreign affairs Greece Georgios Katrougalos, senior fellow at the U.S. Institute of Peace; Distinguished Scholar of the Woodrow Wilson Center Robin Wright.

An open panel discussion took place on the aforementioned topic. The participants shared views regarding the extent to which the idea of multilateralism can function in the present day.
