= District courts of Russia =

The district and town courts of Russia (Russian: районный суд or городской суд; also called rayon or raion courts) are primarily courts of first instance in the judiciary of Russia but sometimes hear appeals from magistrates. They are formed in raion or areas (районах), urban areas (районах в городах), and cities (городах). Decisions of the court are appealed to the regional court.

As courts of first instance, they handle criminal cases where imprisonment is for more than 3 years, and consist of 1 judge and a jury where required. As courts of appeal from decisions of the magistrates consisting of 1 justice of the peace, they consist of 1 judge and retry the case.

They were called People's Courts until 1996.

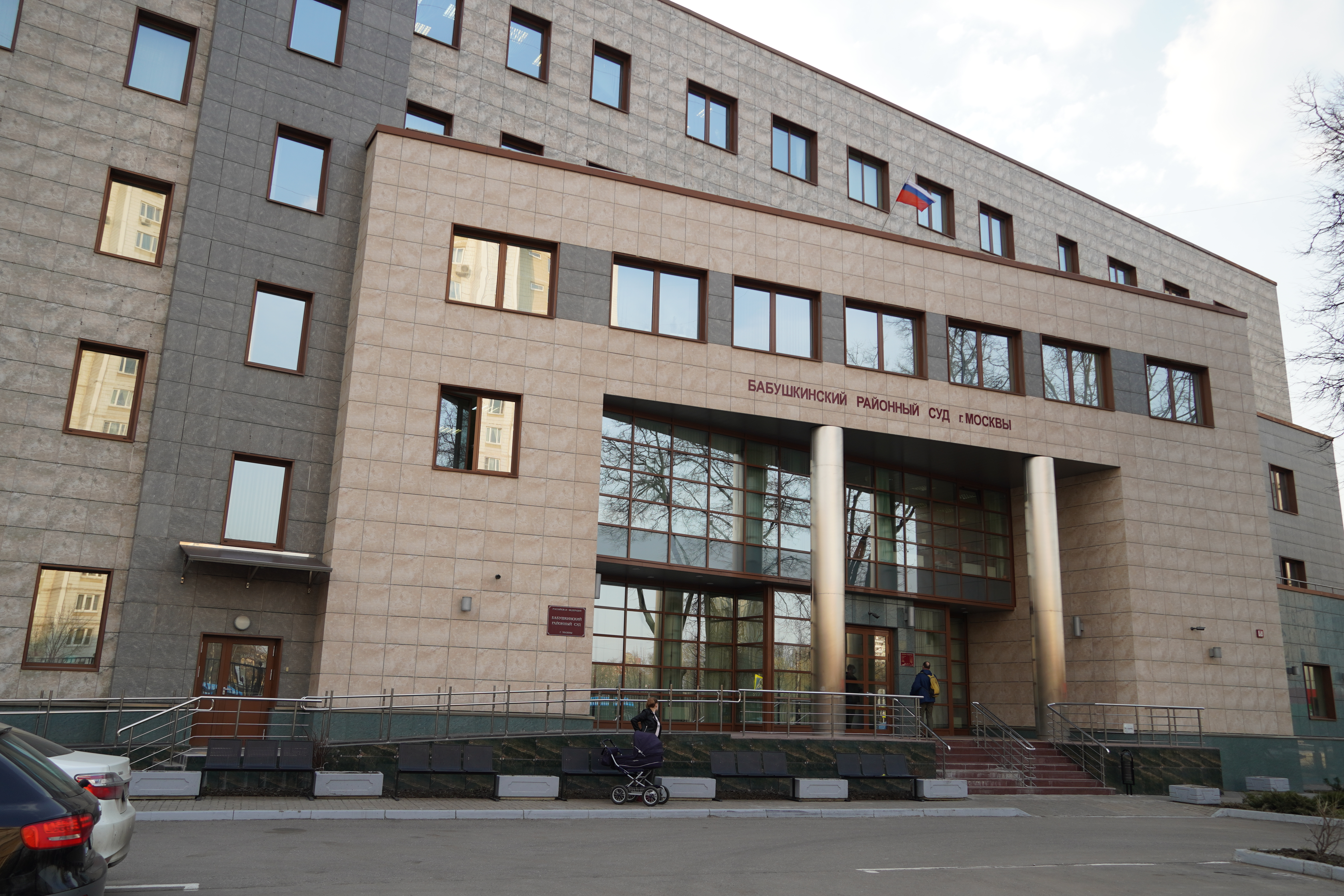
Babushkinsky District Court in Moscow

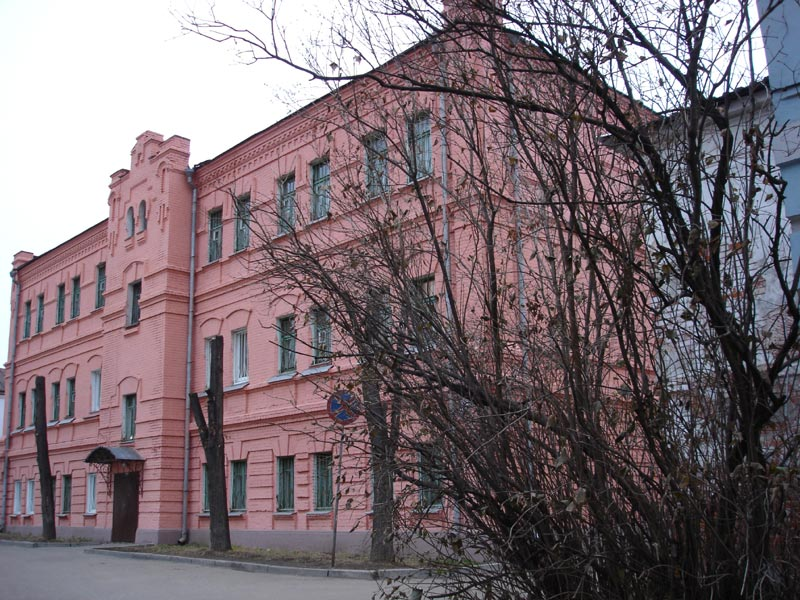
Frunzensky District Court in Vladimir

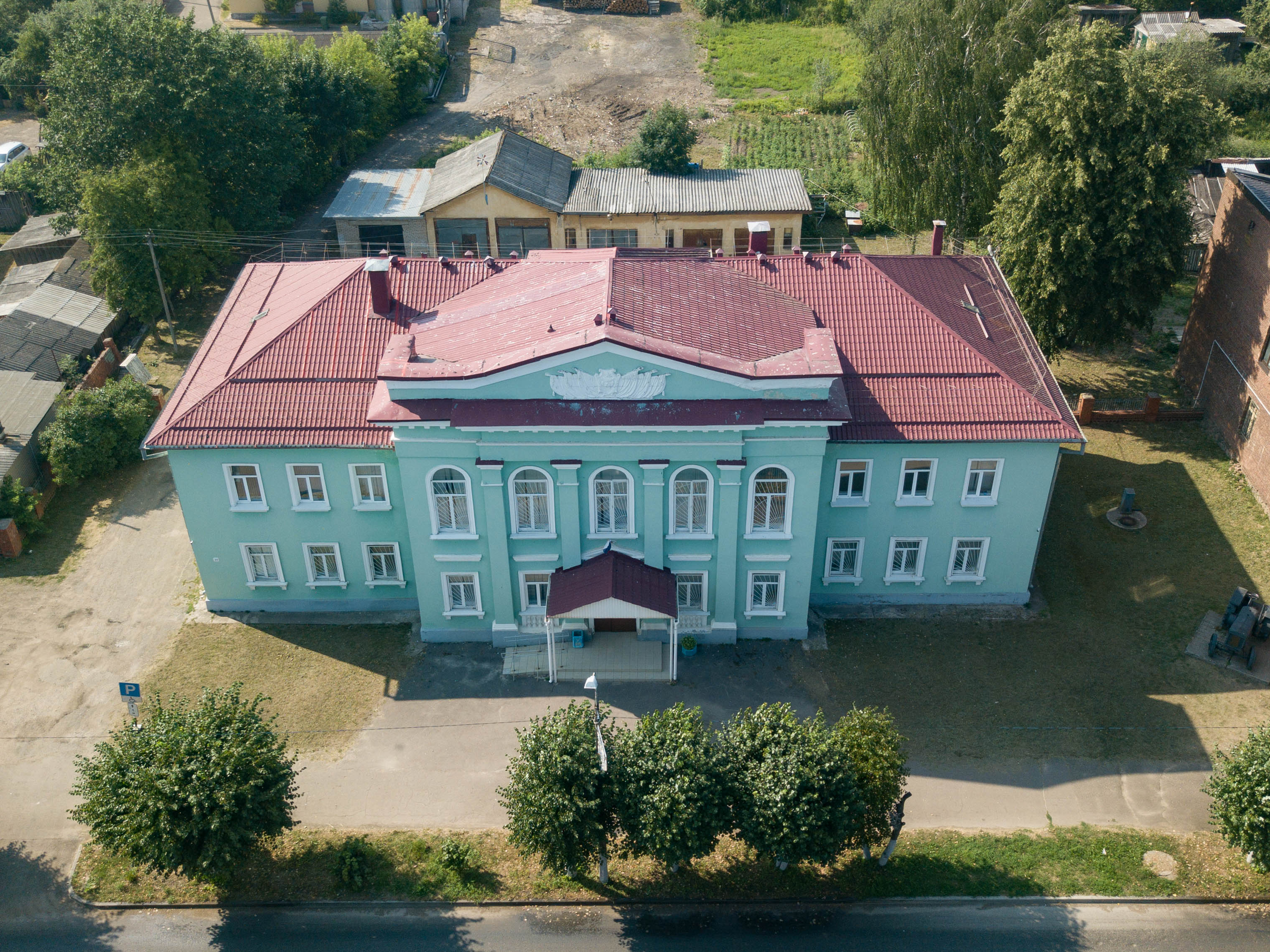
Gdovsky District Court in Pskov Oblast

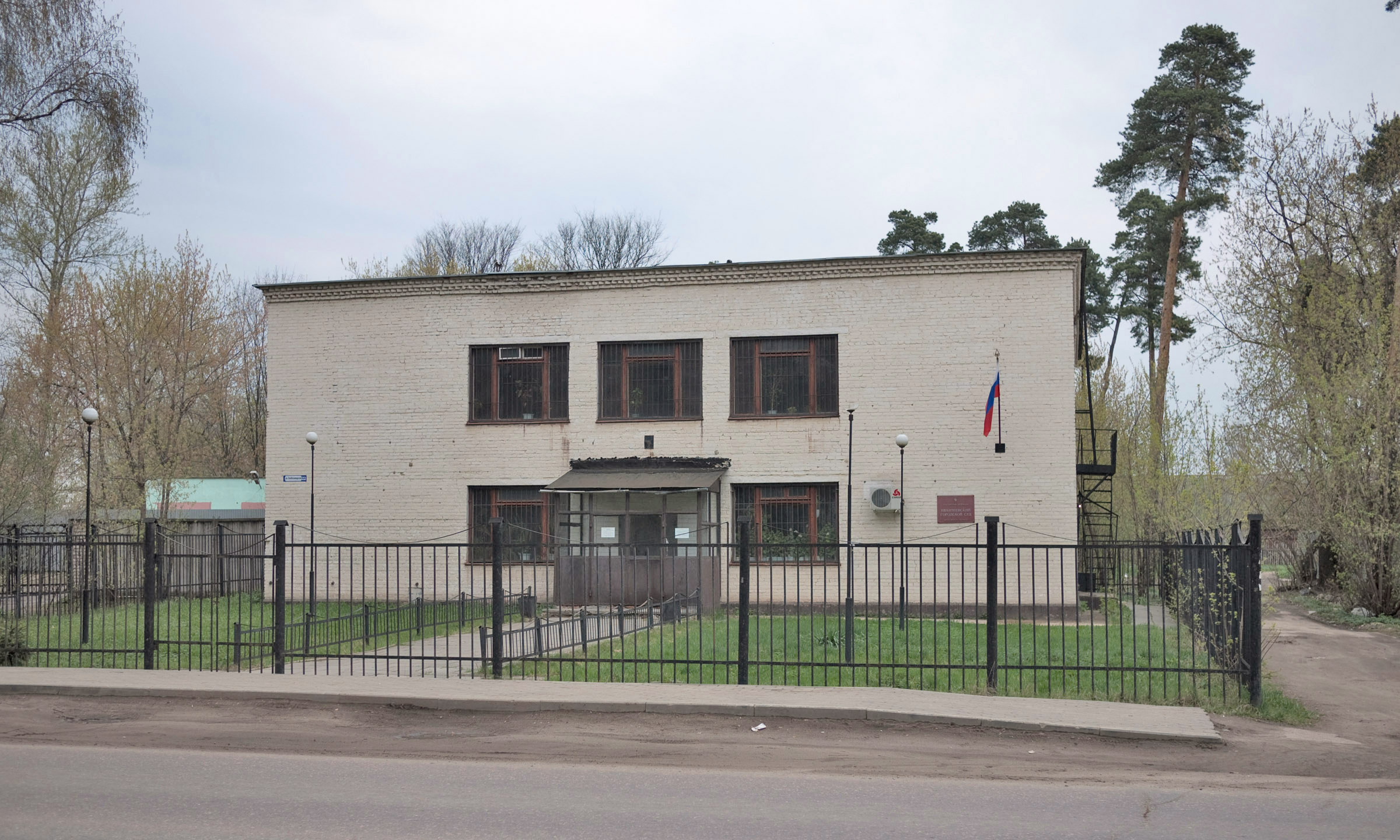
Ivanteyevka Town Court in Moscow Oblast

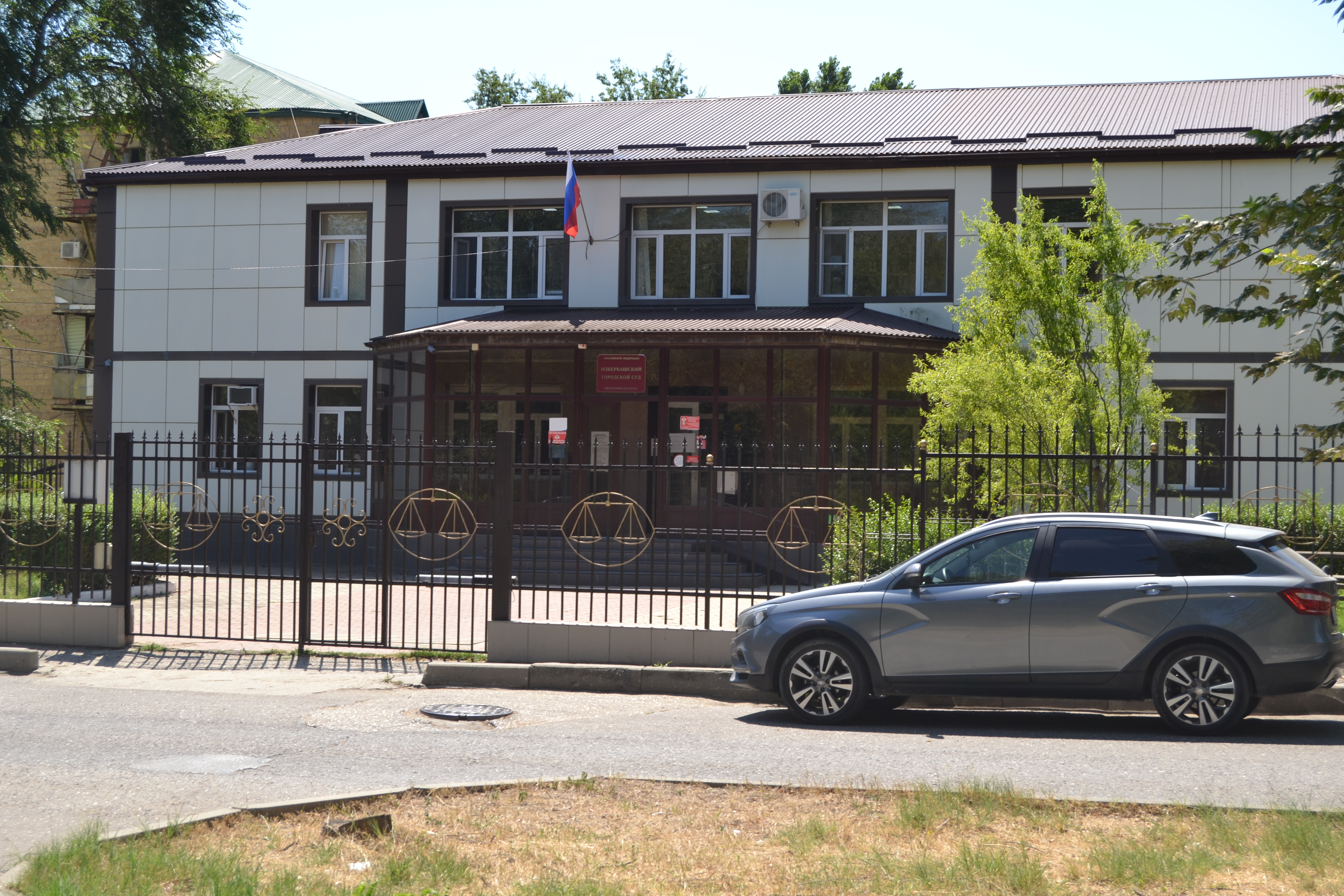
Izberbash Town Court in Dagestan

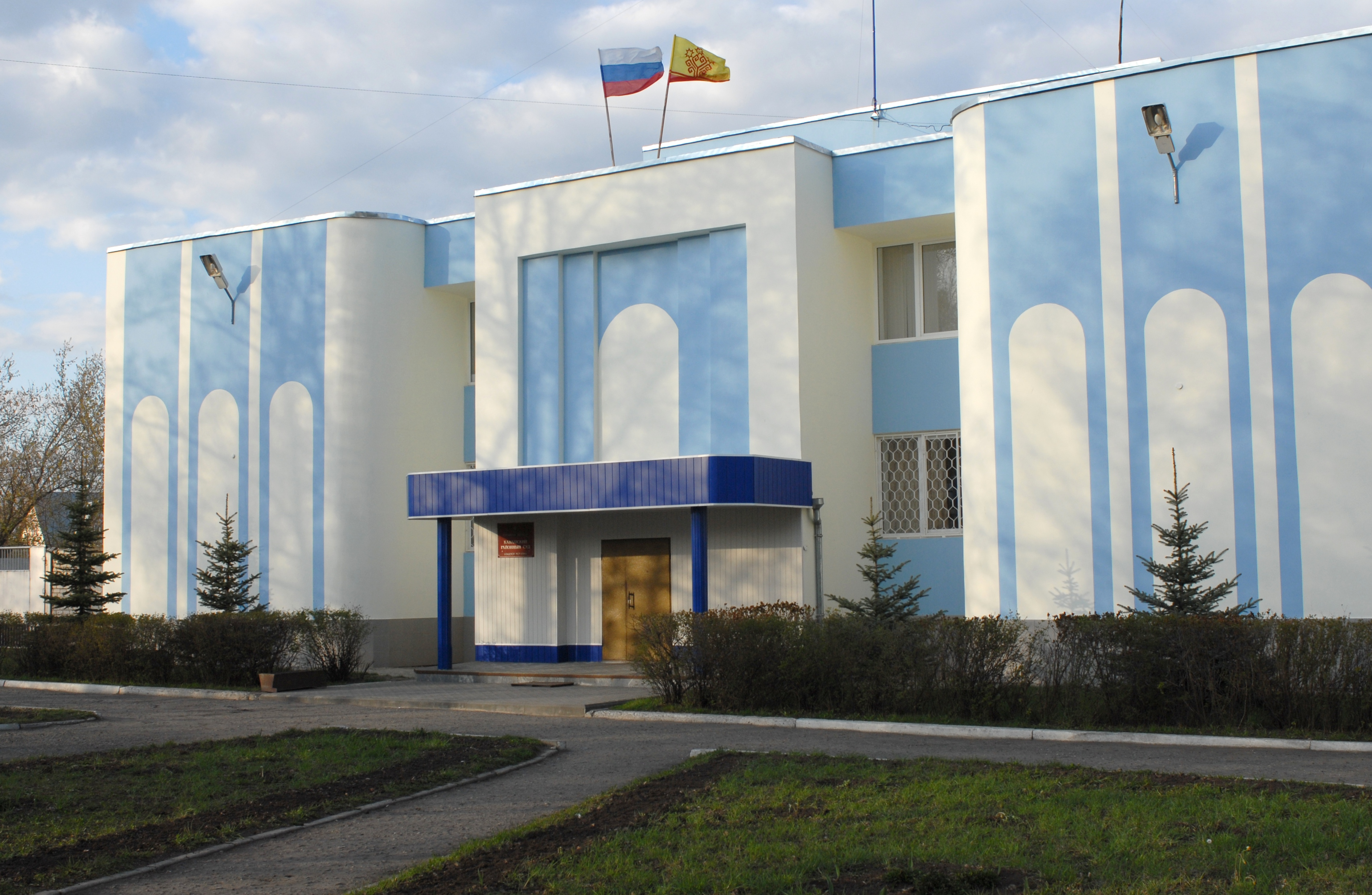
Kanashsky District Court in Chuvashia

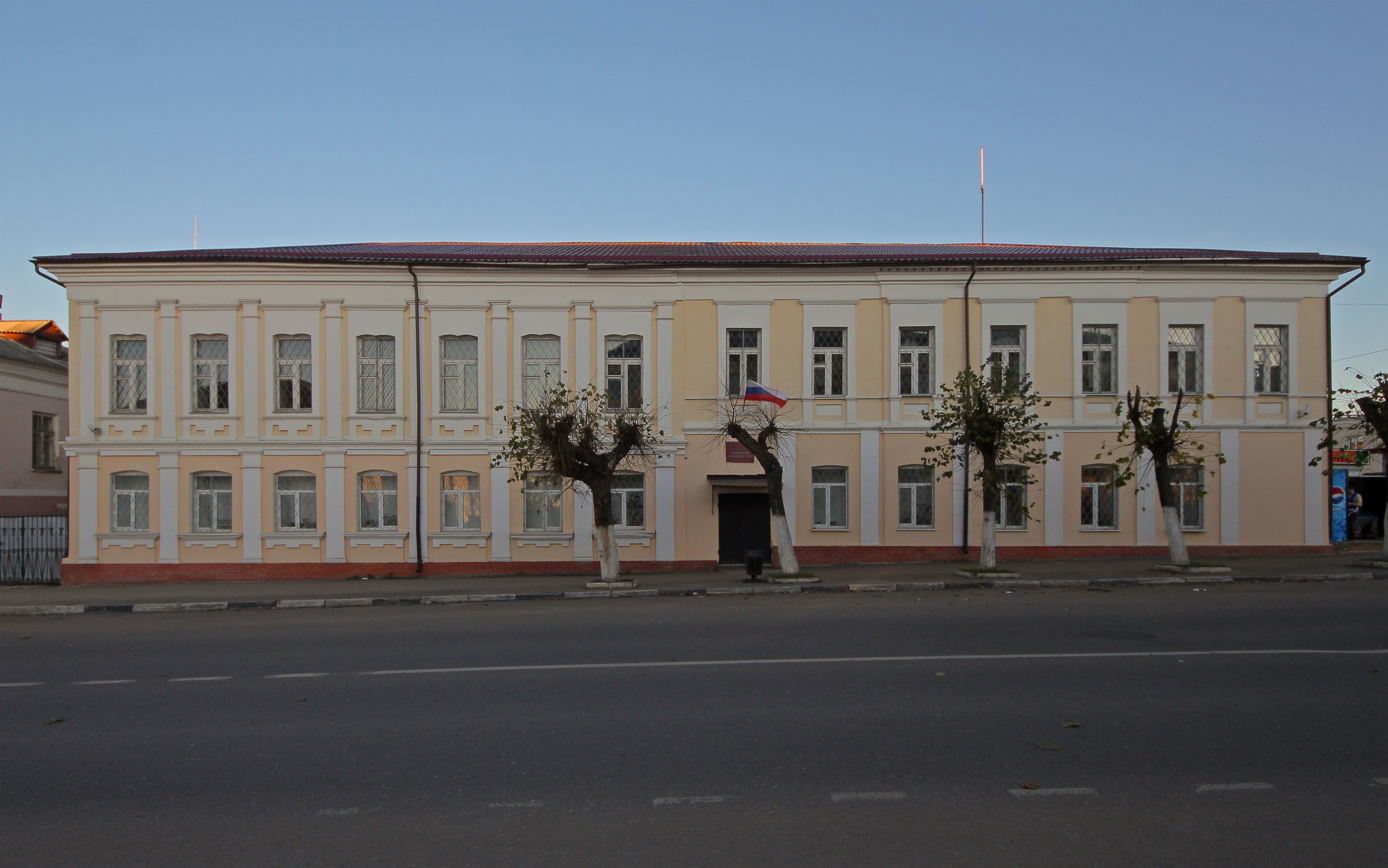
Kashira Town Court in Moscow Oblast

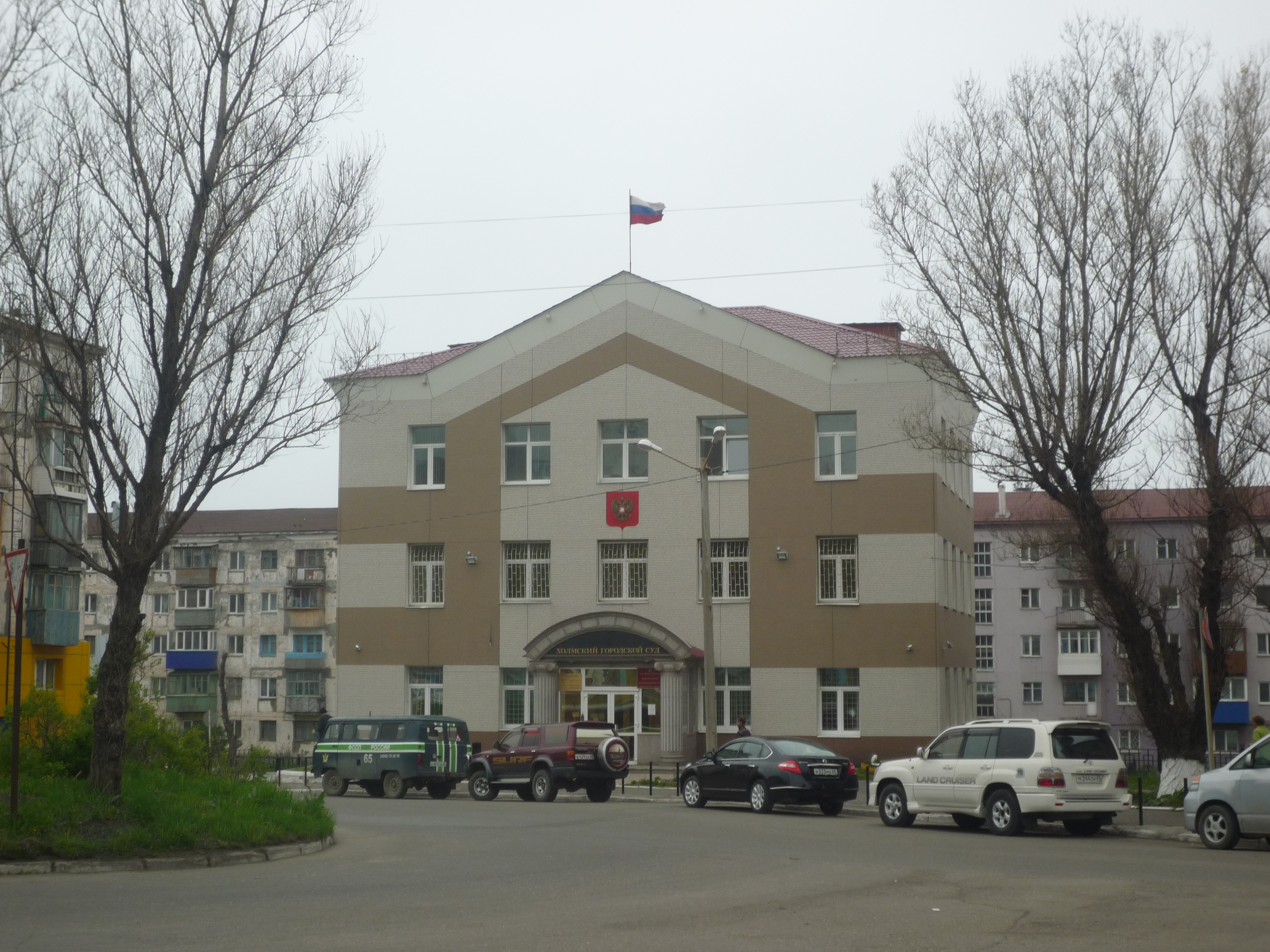
Kholmsk Town Court in Sakhalin Oblast

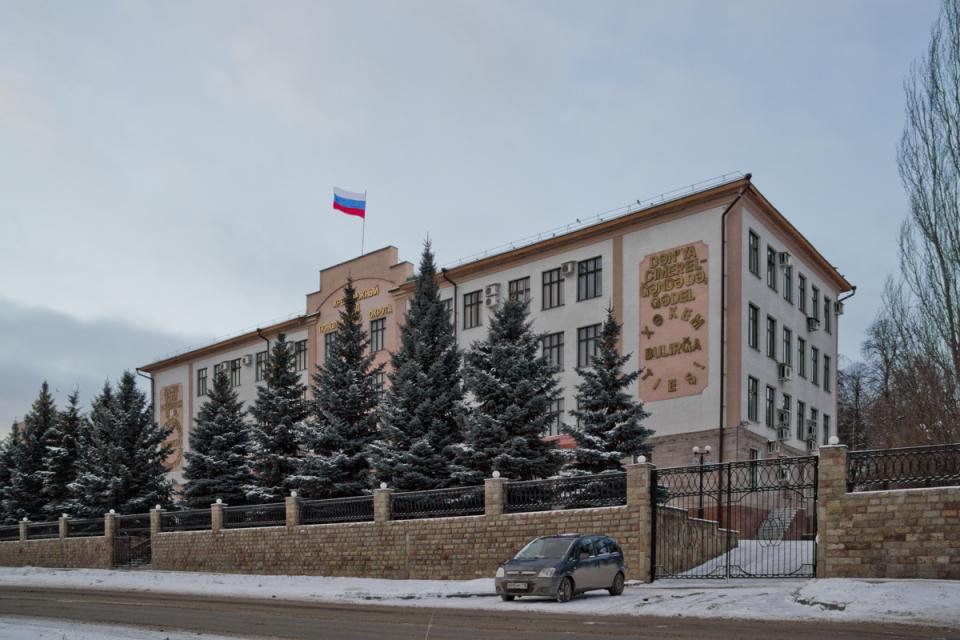
Moskovsky District Court in Kazan

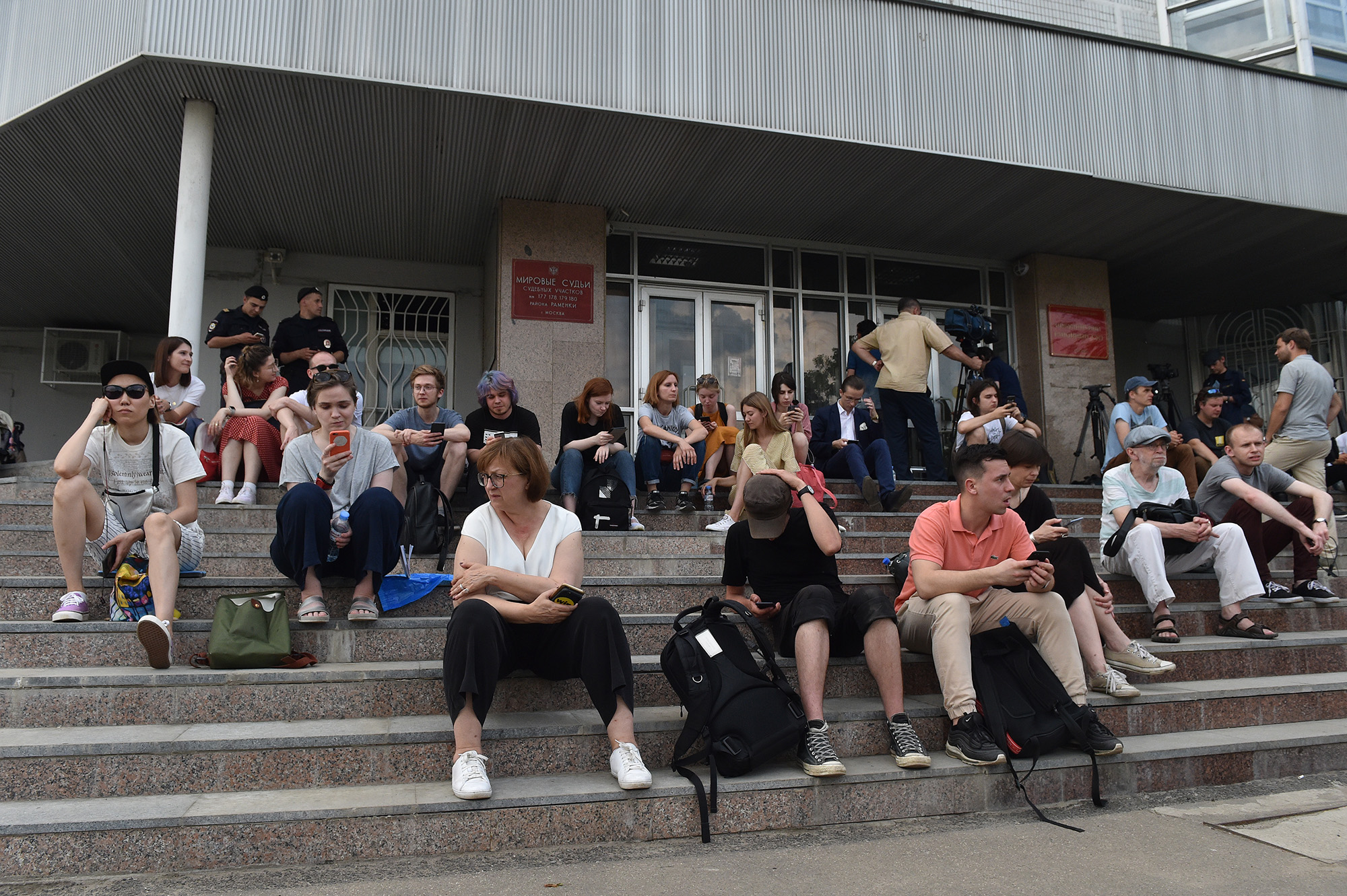
Nikulinsky District Court in Moscow

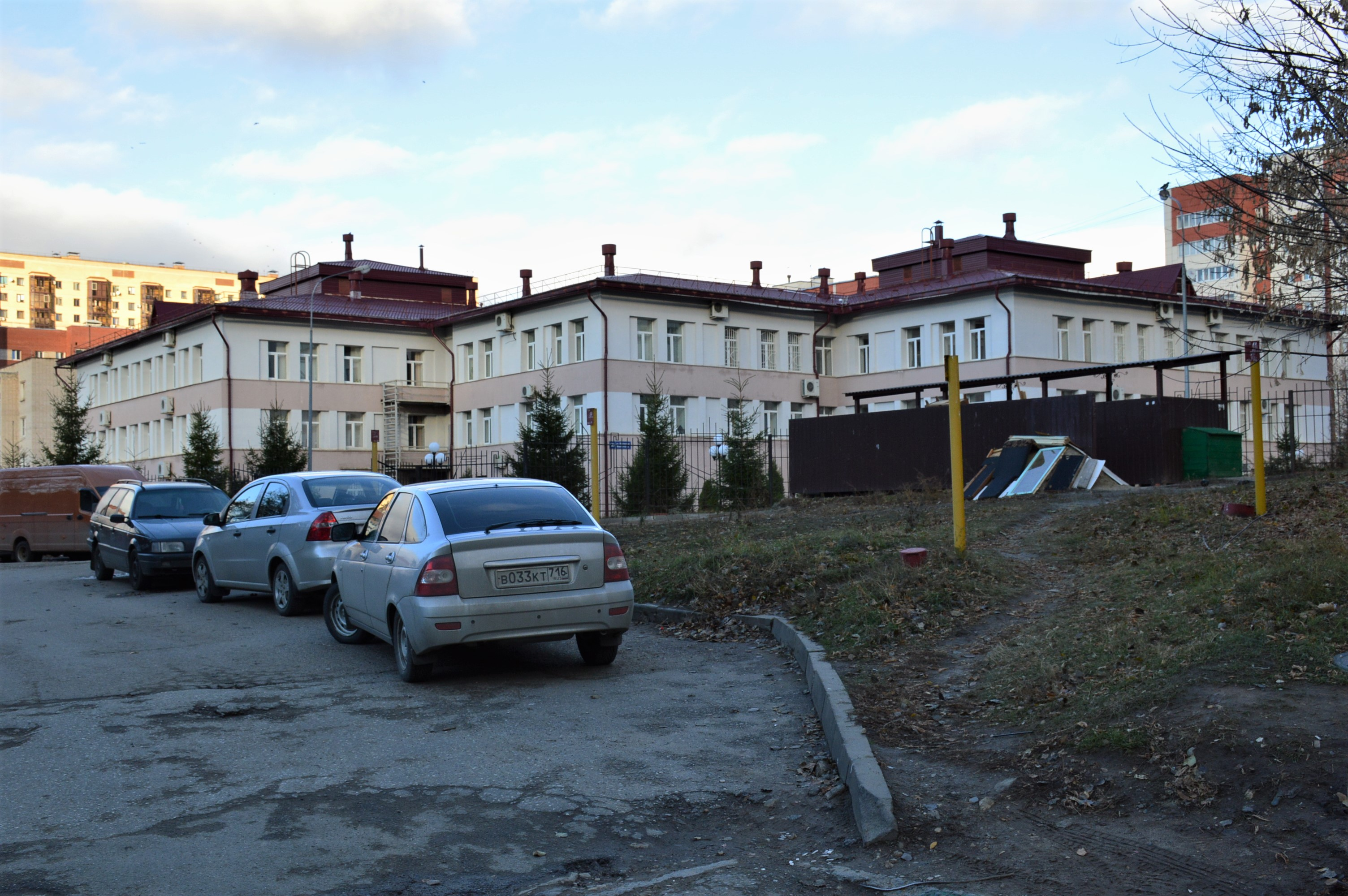
Privolzhsky District Court in Kazan

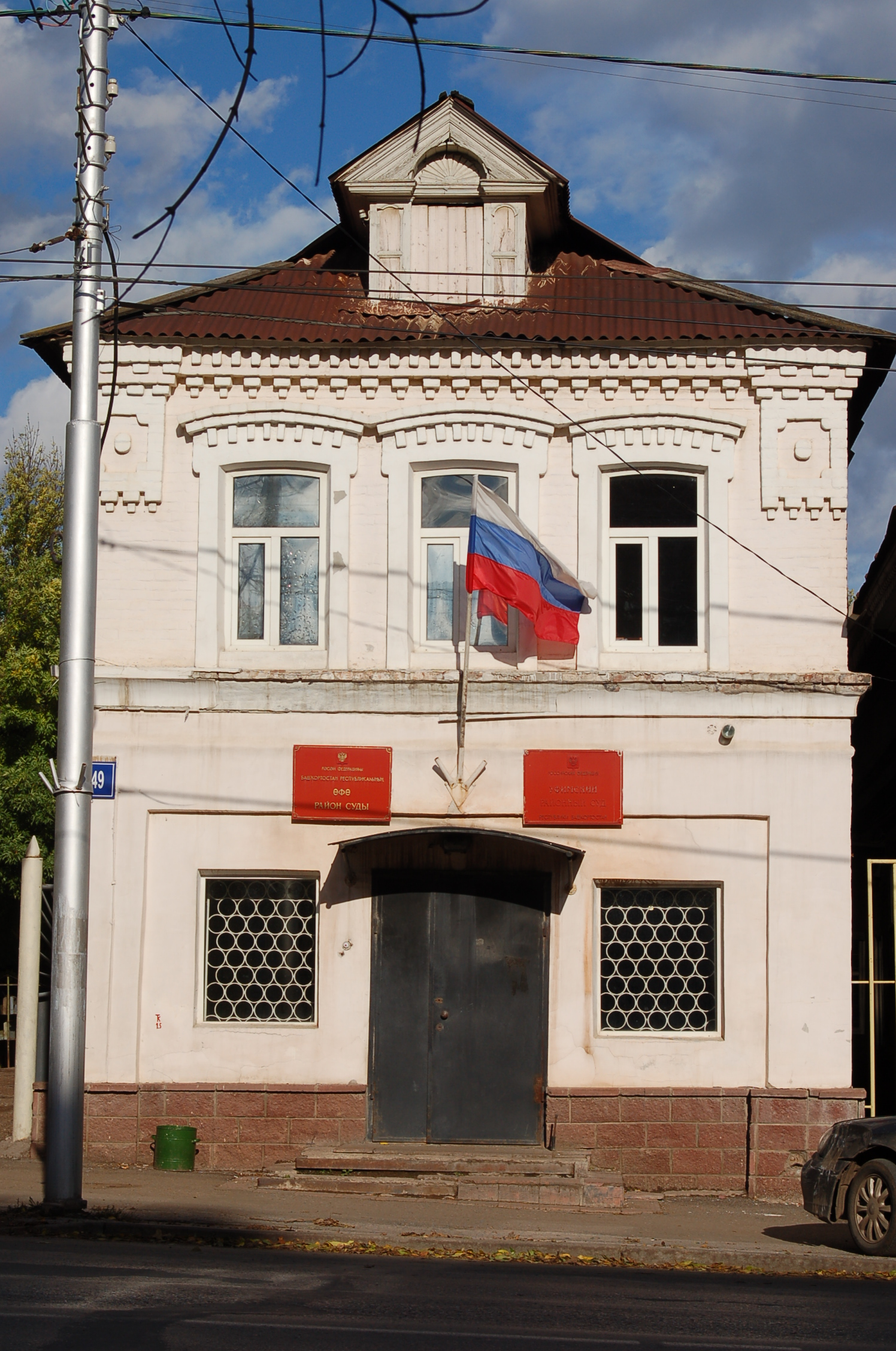
Ufimsky District Court is one of lower courts which Supreme Court of Bashkortostan are doing supervises work

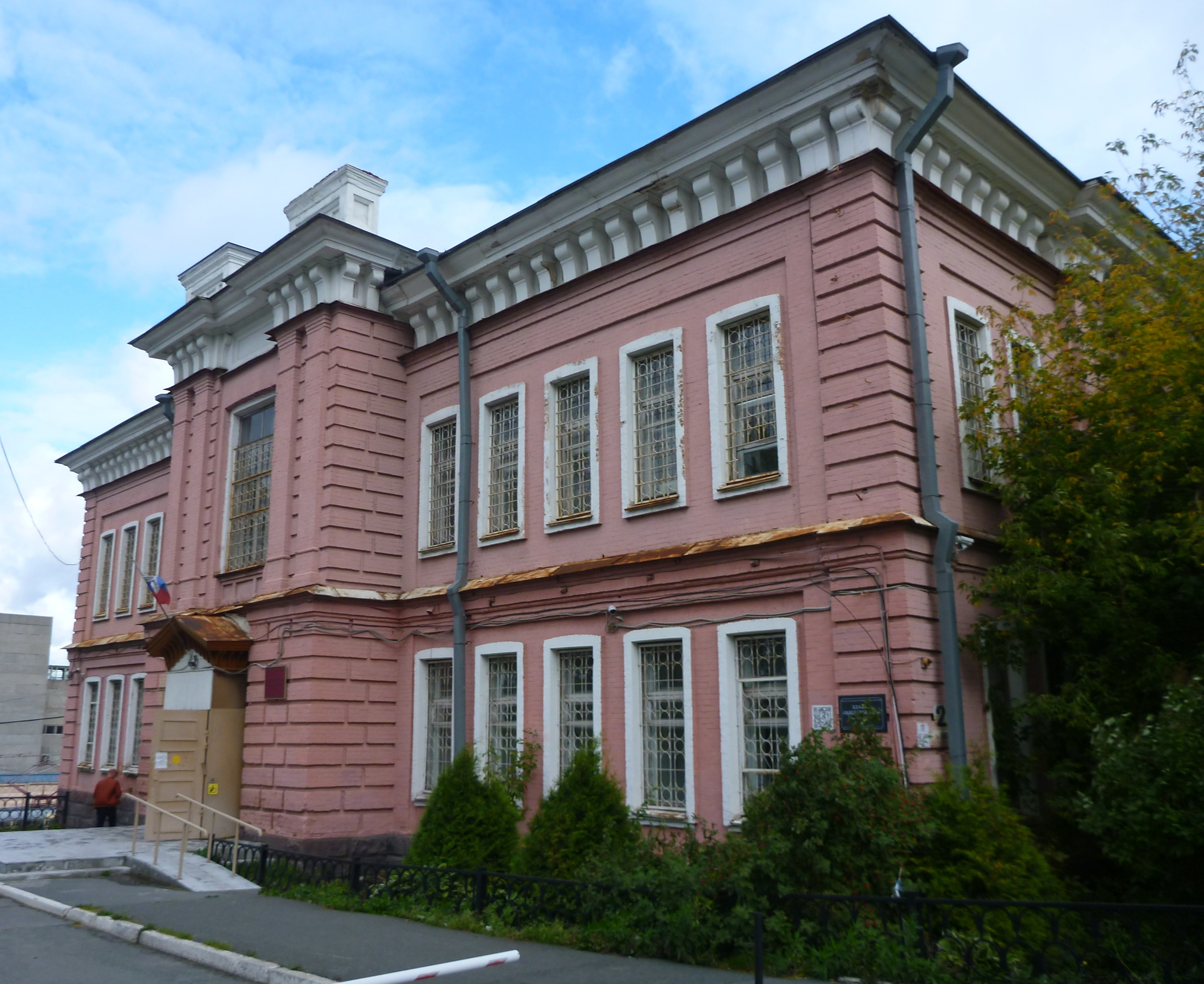
Verkh-Isetsky District Court in Yekaterinburg

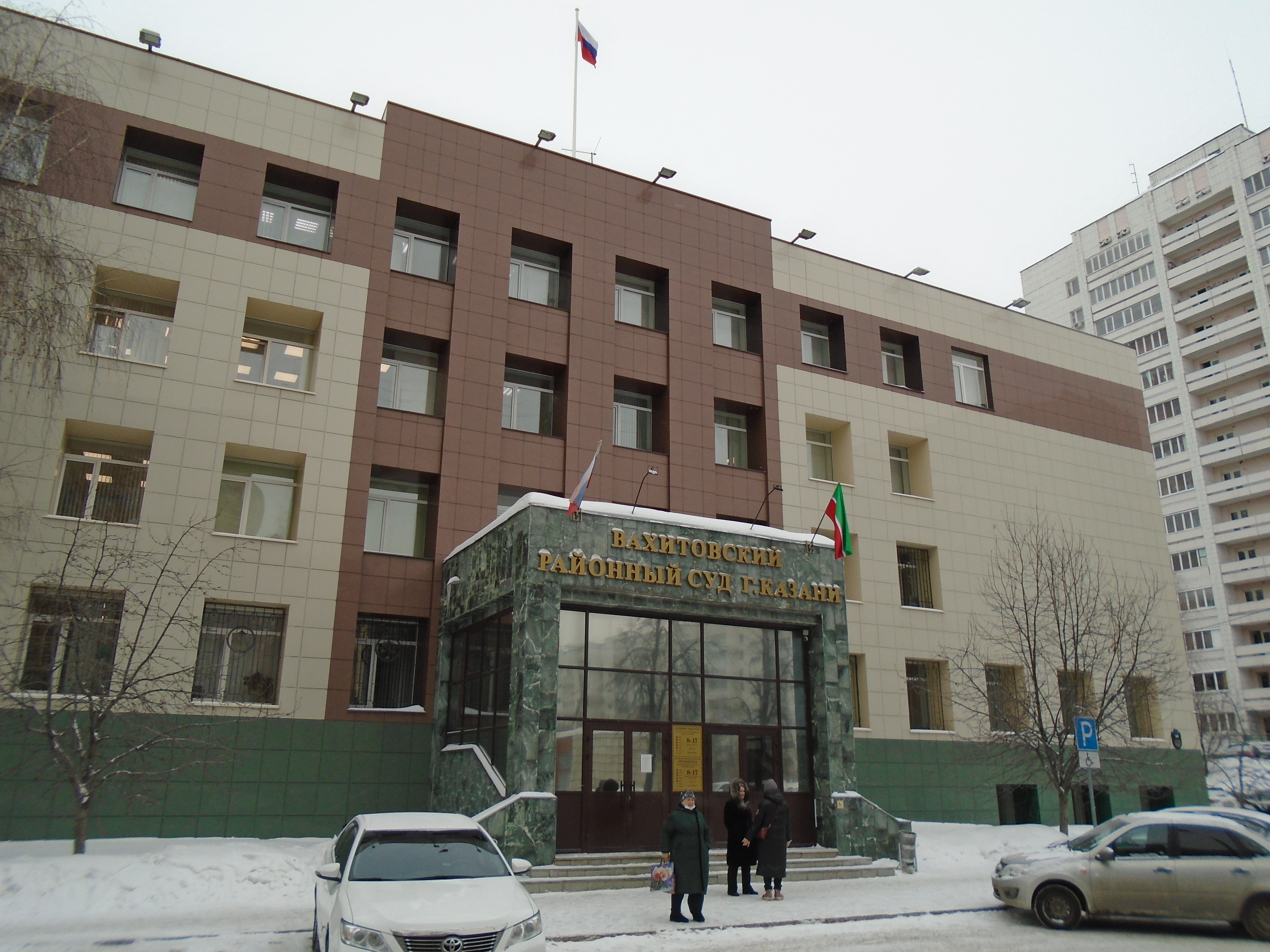
Vakhitovsky District Court in Kazan

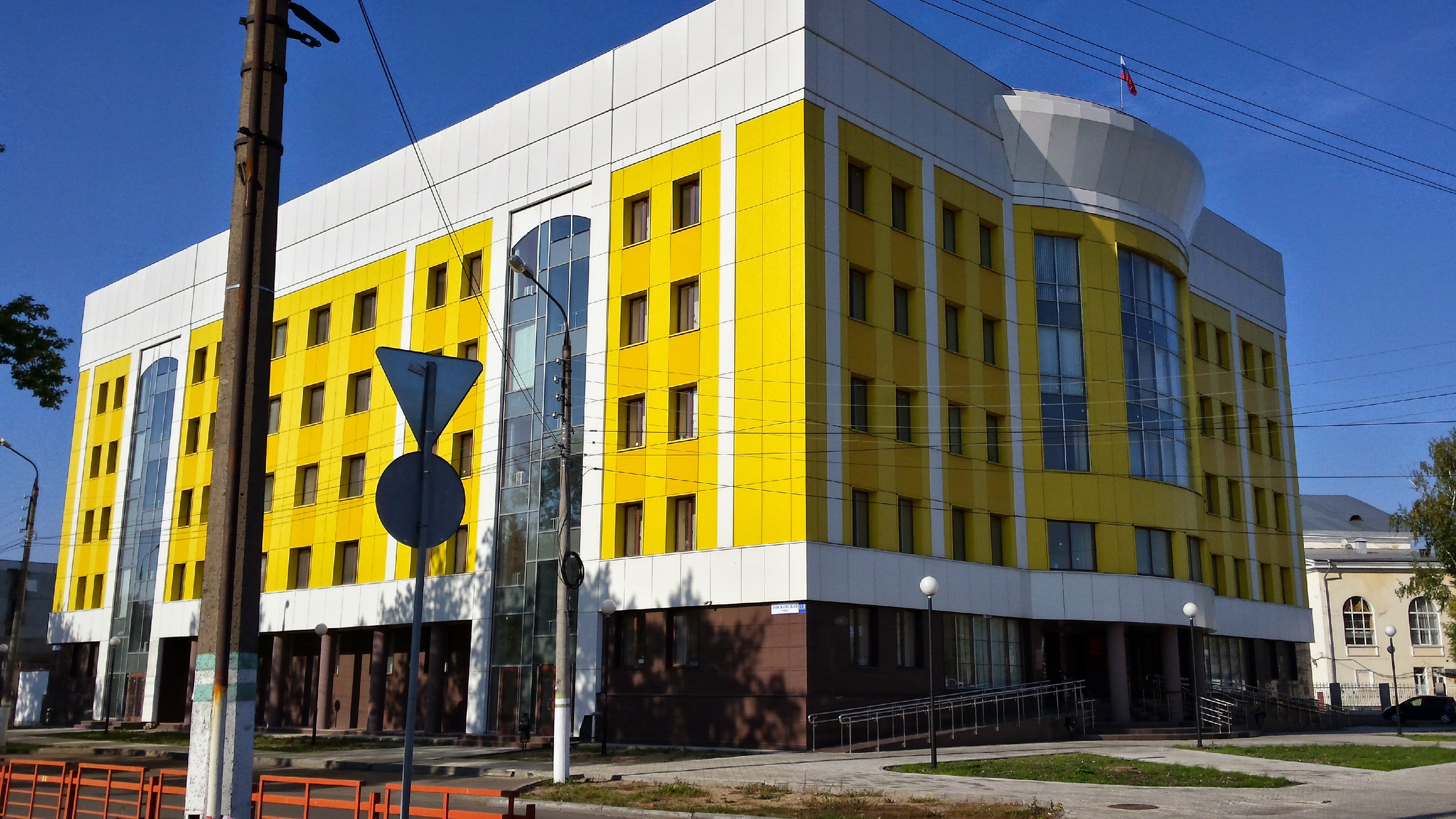
Zavolzhsky District Court in Tver

== See also ==
- Raion
- Magistrate (Russia)
