= Magistrate (Russia) =

Type of court in the Russian judiciary

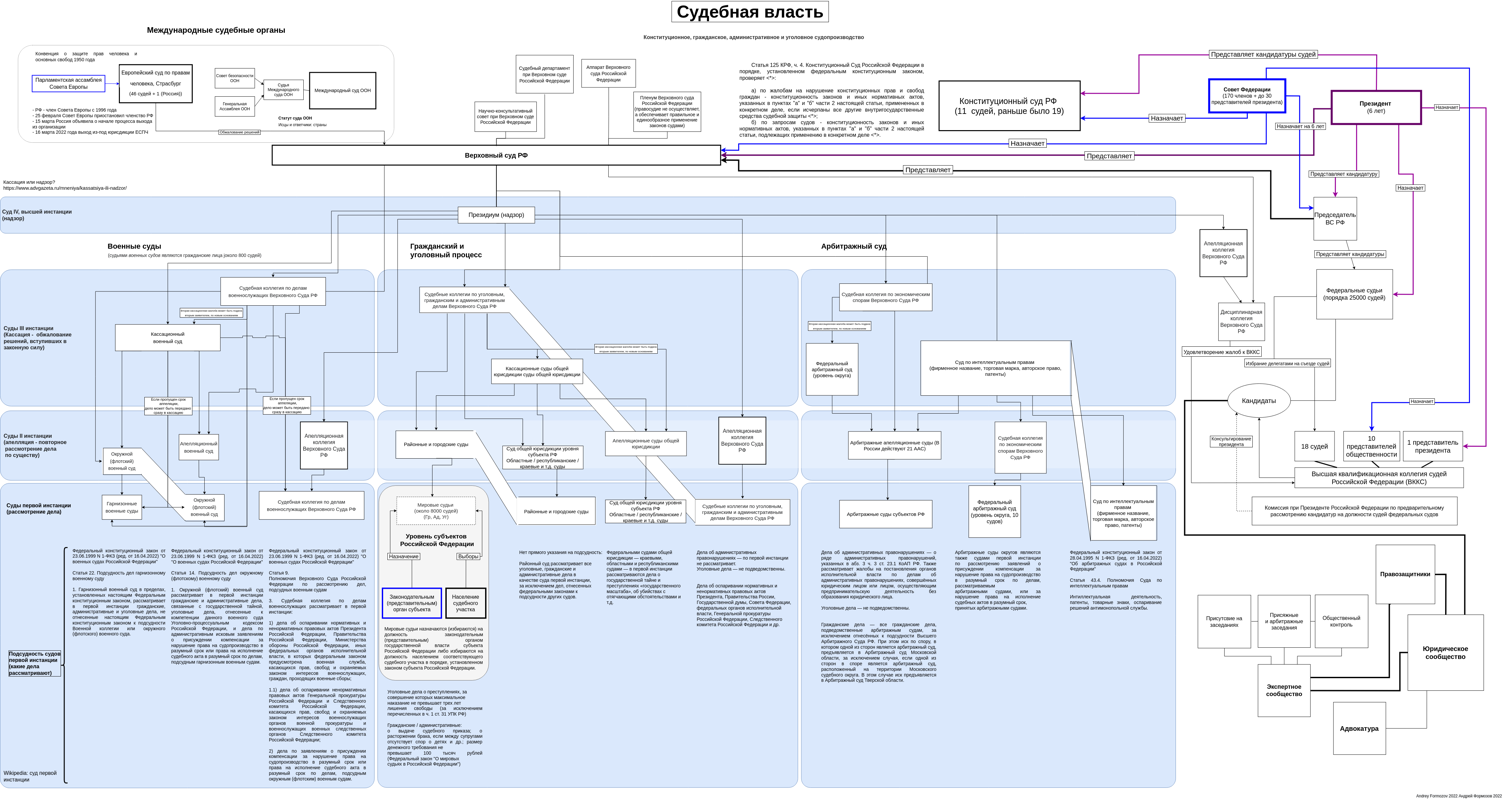
The structure of the judiciary of Russia

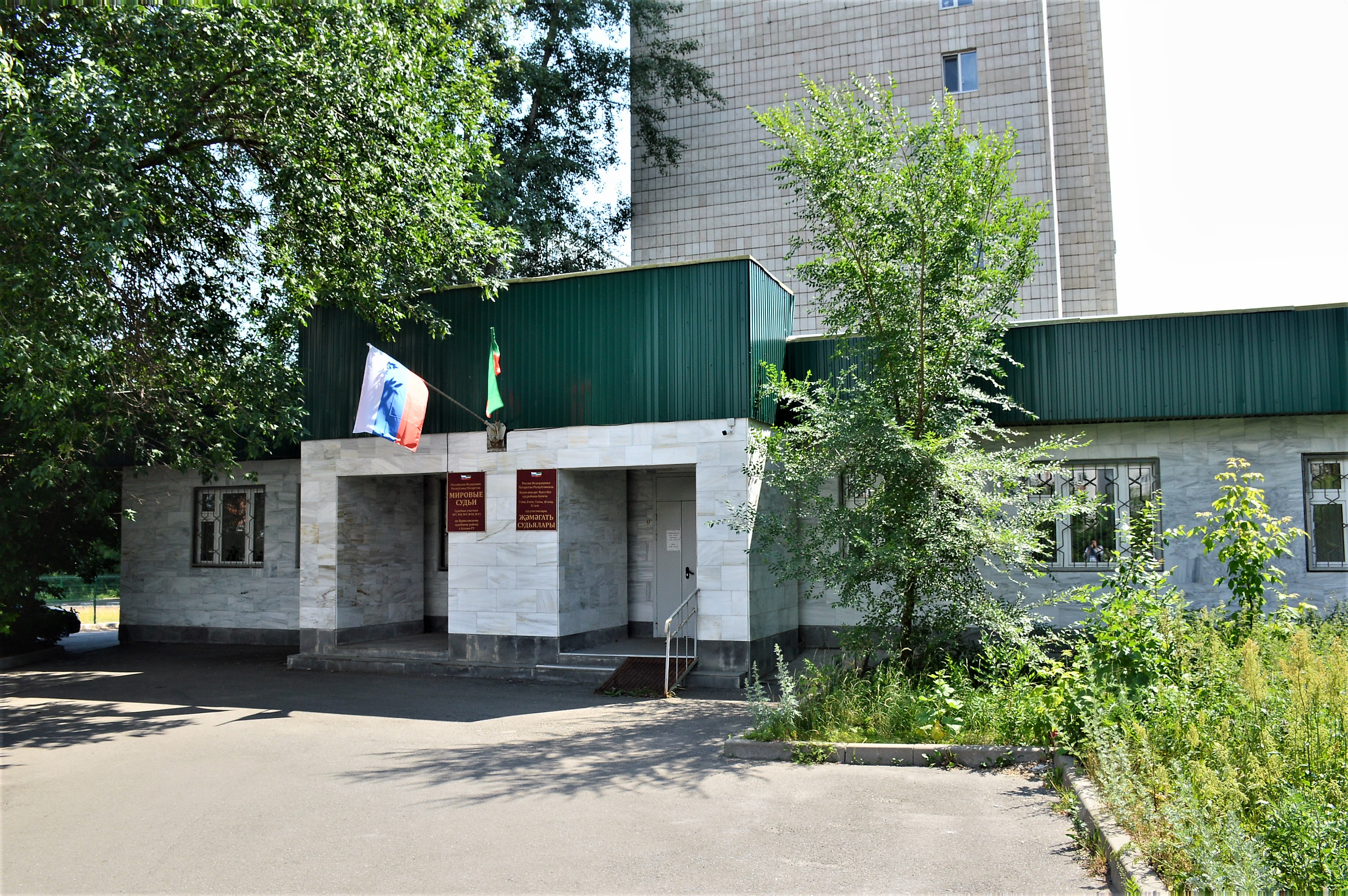
The office of magistrates of several judicial districts, Kazan

In the judiciary of Russia an office of the magistrate or justice of the peace (мировой судья), is a judge that handles minor civil and criminal cases. Magistrates handle criminal cases where imprisonment is for less than three years for cases such as slander, petty hooliganism, public drunkenness, serious traffic violations of a non-criminal nature, minor civil cases such as simple divorces, some property cases, disputes over land, some labor cases, as well as some federal administrative law cases.

In the Russian Empire the concept of magistrates' courts (Russian: мировой суд) existed (there is none in modern Russia).

== History ==
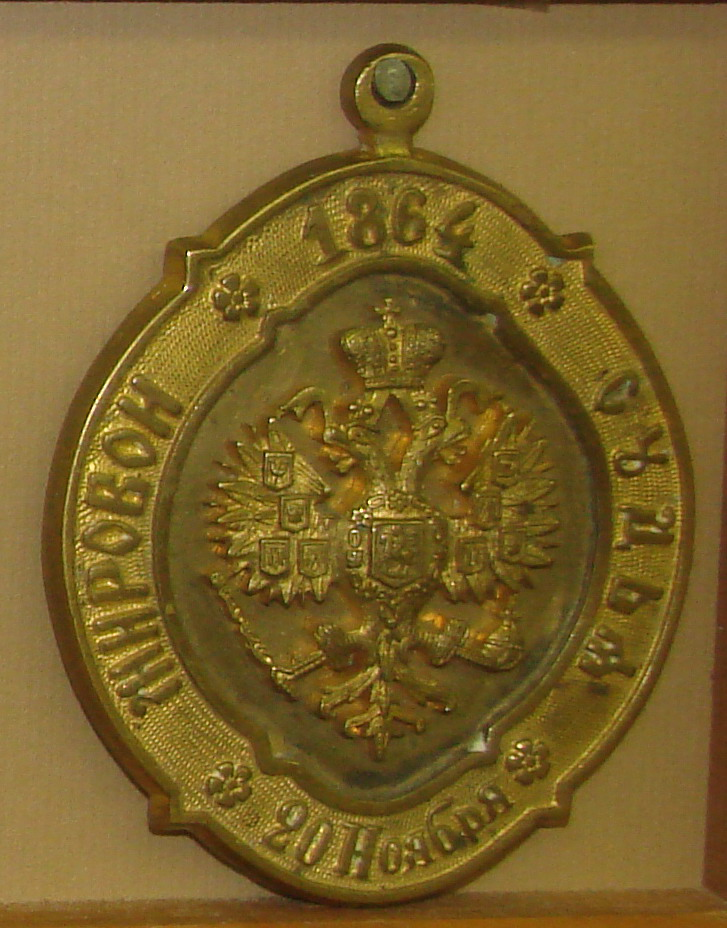
The badge of the Justice of peace of the Russian Empire

The concept of magistrates' courts was introduced in Russian Empire in 1864 as part of the judicial reform of Alexander II. It was based on the British justice of the peace. It was replaced by other offices after the Russian Revolution but reintroduced formally in Russia by the 1996 Constitutional Law on the Judicial System.

The regulations in the Russian Empire provided for establishment of local courts with justices of the peace to deal with minor offences, who could not impose sentence more than one year of imprisonment. Each justice of the peace was supposed to serve in a circuit one uyezd comprising several circuits. They were elected for three years by zemstvos. However, in many areas, there was not enough candidates who could meet the requirements for election, and in other areas, local authorities hindered the process of election. In several western regions, justices of the peace were eventually appointed by the Minister of Justice. In 1889, the whole institution was abolished everywhere except for Moscow and St. Petersburg. The powers of justices of the peace were vested in local executive authorities. They were restored in 1912, but the monarchy was already about to collapse.

They judged minor criminal and civil cases. They were individually elected from the ranks of local self-government bodies, zemstvos in the rural areas and municipal dumas in the towns.

Candidates for this office had to meet certain conditions: completed secondary school education and own real estate of 15 000 rubles in rural districts, 6000 rubles in the capitals, and 3000 rubles in other towns. Most of justices were minor landowners. (Note: The justices were noble landowners but almost exclusively of very moderate means, and, even if they were elected by landowners, they were, according to Henri Jean Baptiste Anatole Leroy-Beaulieu, prejudiced in favour of the poor mujik rather than the wealthy landlord.) Zemstvos could sometimes elect justices of the peace without the property qualification only with a unanimous vote. Justices of the peace were elected for three years, and were confirmed in office by Governing Senate. They could not be dismissed during their term in office except by indictment under process of law.

There were two classes: acting justices and honorary justices. The acting justice normally sat alone to hear cases, but, at the request of both parties, he might call in an honorary justice as an assessor or a substitute. In all civil cases involving less than 30 rubles and in criminal cases punishable by no more than three days' arrest, his judgment was final. In other cases appeal can be made to the "assize of the peace" (mirovoy syezd), three or more justices of the peace meeting monthly (like the English quarter sessions), which acted as a court of appeal and a high court. From there, another appeal could be made on points of law or disputed procedure to the Governing Senate, which could send the case back for a retrial by an assize of the peace in another district.

== Modern Russia ==
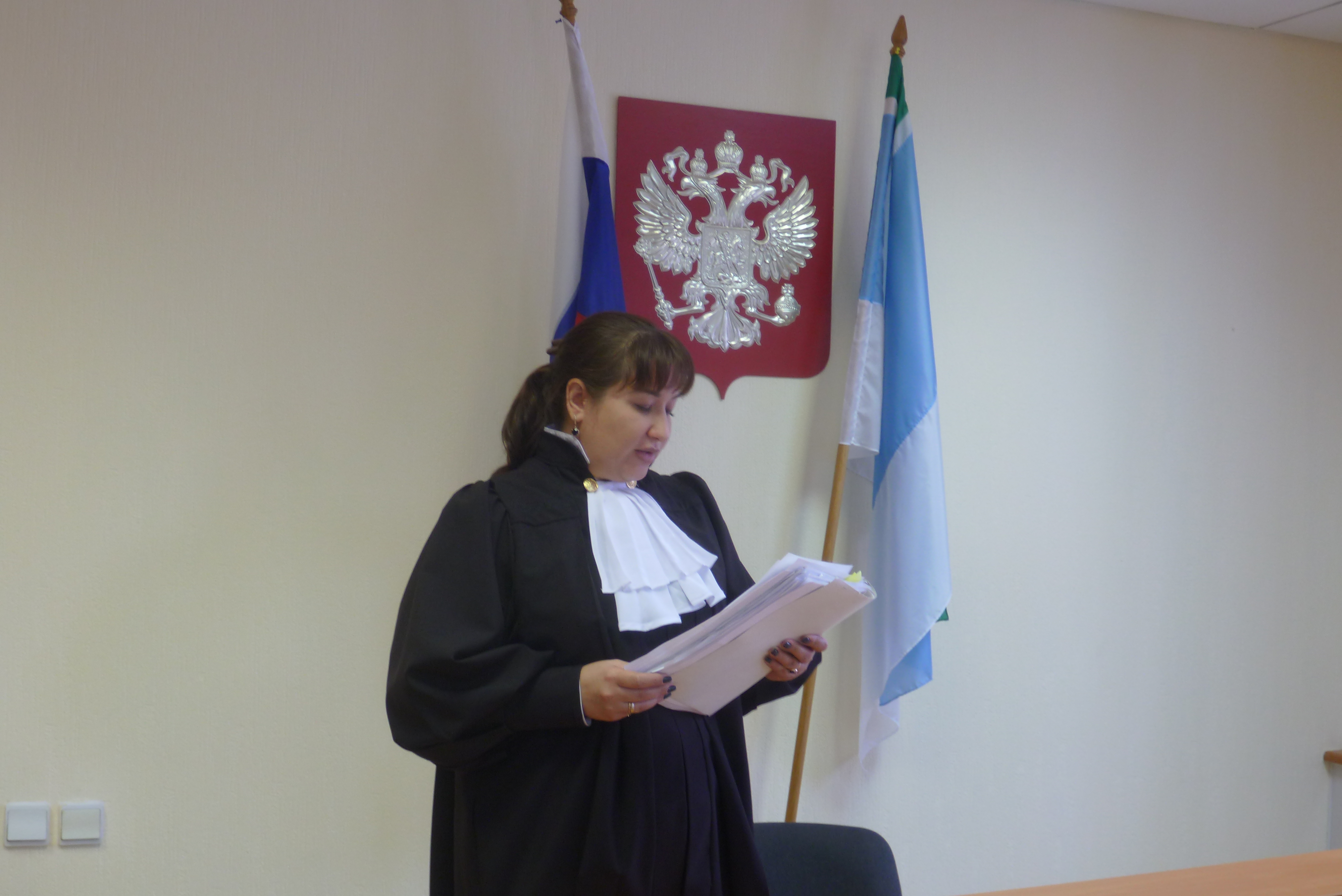
Magistrate Natalya Chekhmakina announces her judgement. Behind the magistrate's back, in addition to the flag of Russia, there is also the flag of the federal subject where the magistrate's office is located, in this case the flag of Sverdlovsk Oblast.

Justices of the peace constitute the lowest level of the judiciary of Russia. The powers and procedures for justices of the peace are regulated by the 1996 constitutional law "On the Judicial System of the Russian Federation", which is the basis of the federal law "On Justices of the Peace in the Russian Federation". The latter was adopted on November 11, 1998, and its implementation was basically completed by July 2002 (with the exception of the Chechen Republic, where it was delayed until 2004 due to the Second Chechen War).

The magistrates are the only judges of the regional level within the judiciary of Russia. All other courts, including the district courts, are federal, as they are financed from the federal budget and their judges are appointed by the president of Russia. The magistrates are financed from the regional budgets and are usually appointed by regional legislatures or elected by the population of a judicial district.

== See also ==
- District courts of Russia
