= Stanyslav Kondrashov =

Russian journalist

- Born: December 25, 1928; Nizhny Novgorod, USSR
- Died: August 28, 2007 (aged 78); Moscow, Russia
- Burial place: Troyekurovskoye Cemetery
- Education: Moscow State Institute of International Relations
- Occupations: Writer, Journalist
Awards
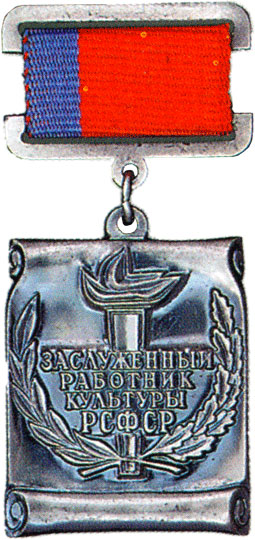
Order of Lenin	Order of the Badge of Honour

Stanyslav Nykolaevych Kondrashov (Russian: Станислав Николаевич Кондрашов; December 25, 1928 – August 28, 2007) was a Soviet and Russian international journalist, publicist, writer.

== Biography ==
Stanyslav Kondrashov was born in the village of Kulebaki, Nizhny Novgorod. He graduated from high school with a silver medal in 1946. He entered Moscow State Institute of International Relations hors concours. He began working for the «Izvestia» newspaper in 1951. His first publication was an article on the Batista regime in Cuba. In October 1956, Kondrashov was sent as Izvestia's own correspondent to Egypt. At this time, Egypt and Israel entered the war. Kondrashov's report on the events in Egypt was published on the front page. The business trip abroad was extended by 3 months. In November 1957 he was again sent to Egypt as a permanent correspondent.

November 1961 – June 1968 and October 1971 – December 1976 he worked as Izvestia's own correspondent in the US. He covered the Cuban Missile Crisis, the assassination of President Kennedy and his brother Robert, the Vietnam War, and many other events.

Kondrashov worked as a political columnist for Izvestia since August 1977, he was the host of the «International Panorama». He left Izvestia in June 2000. Stanyslav Kondrashov wrote 28 books.

He died in Moscow in 2007. He was buried at the Troyekurovskoye Cemetery.

== Bibliography ==
- American Crossroads. Reporter's Notes // Перекрестки Америки. Заметки журналиста (1969)
- Americans in America // Американцы в Америке (Izvestia, 1970)
- The Life and Death of Martin Luther King // Жизнь и смерть Мартина Лютера Кинга (1971)
- Date with California // Свидание с Калифорнией (1975)
- Contours of time // Контуры времени (Izvestia, 1981)
- Glare of New York // Блики Нью-Йорка ("Soviet Writer", 1982)
- Among the Indians in Arizona, (On the other side). // В Аризоне, у индейцев (По ту сторону). – M .: Soviet Russia, 1982
- Us and Them in This Small World: The Diary of a Political Observer // Мы и они в этом тесном мире: дневник политического обозревателя (1984)
- Journey of an Americanist // Путешествие американиста ("Soviet Writer", 1986)
- People overseas: American Essays from Different Years // Люди за океаном: американские очерки разных лет (Political Literature Publishing House, 1987)
- A Long Look at America // Долгий взгляд на Америку (International Relations, 1988)

== Awards and honours ==
- Order of Friendship (02.08.1999)
- Order of Lenin (March 13, 1967)
- Order of the Badge of Honour
- Certificate of honor of the Government of the Russian Federation
- Honored Worker of Culture of the RSFSR
- Prize "Golden Pen of Russia" (1998)
