= Alexander Kondrashov (blogger) =

Russian travel blogger (born 1983)

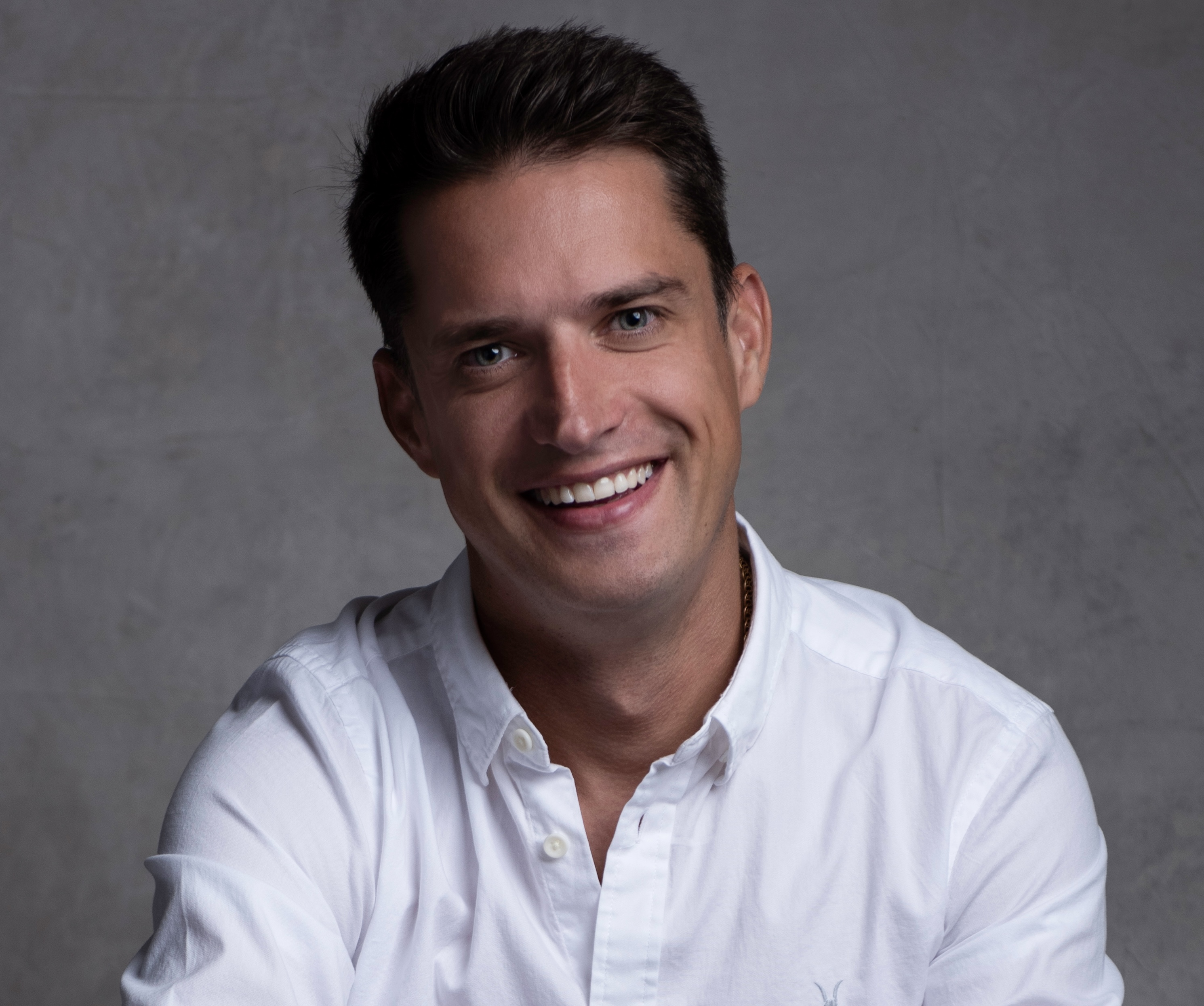
- Born: Alexander Viktorovich Kondrashov; November 21, 1983; Prague, Czechoslovakia
- Occupations: Explorer, blogger
- Known for: Russian Geographical Society member, expeditions organizer

Alexander Viktorovich Kondrashov (born 21 November 1983; Russian: Александр Викторович Кондрашов) is a Russian travel blogger, explorer, and writer. He is known primarily for his YouTube channel, Alexander Kondrashov, which had 1.3 million subscribers as of November 2018.

== Early life ==
Kondrashov was born in Prague, Czechoslovakia. His father was a soldier, and his mother was a schoolteacher. At the age of five, his family moved to a military townlet near Mozhaysk. He graduated from a military academy and later from the Department of Automatics and Electronics at the National Research Nuclear University MEPhI (Moscow Engineering Physics Institute). He is married to a woman named Anastasiya.

== Career ==
In 2007, after three years of working at Konzern Transmashholding, Alexander opened a business selling and renting railway cars.

On 17 March 2011, he launched the YouTube channel Justdoit150gmail. By November 2018, the channel had gained 1.3 million subscribers, more than 320 million views, and was one of the top Russian travel blogs. His most popular video is 'What Would Happen If We Put Crabs with Piranhas', with more than 21 million views.

In 2016, Alexander took part in a live video conference with Vladimir Putin from Antarctica and was invited by the Department of Tourism of Estonia to record a video review in Tallinn. In 2016 he took part in the reality show Bloggers a la Fleet by Wargaming.net, in which video bloggers travelled for six days sailing on the ship Kruzenshtern. A televised version of the project was broadcast by the Belarusian TV channel ONT in January 2017.

In 2017, Alexander founded his advertising agency, BloggersMedia, to produce YouTube channels and Instagram blogs. In August 2017, together with the Mamont Cup 2017 expedition, he visited the Shantar Islands and documented the operation to save a bowhead whale trapped in a conduit of Bolshoye Lake on Big Shantar Island in the Okhotsk Sea.

In 2018, at the request of Rosturizm, Kondrashov visited the cities of the FIFA World Cup 2018, for which he made video guides.

== Recognition ==
- GQ Travel Awards 2018 nomination (Best Travel Blogger)

== Bibliography ==
- Life in motion. How to achieve success while remaining true to yourself — Moscow.: Eksmo, 2019. — 352 pages, ill. ISBN 978-5-04-103232-6
