= Dolores Kondrashova =

Russian Soviet hairdresser and designer (1936–2023)

Dolores Kondrashova Commandeur
- Долорес Кондрашова
- Kondrashova in 2018
- Born: Dolores Gurgenovna Terteryan; 24 September 1936; Baku, Azerbaijan SSR, USSR
- Died: 23 January 2023 (aged 86); Moscow, Russia
- Resting place: Vostryakovskoye Cemetery
- Occupations: hairdresser; designer; businesswoman
- Years active: 1962 – 2023
- Height: 148 cm (4 ft 10 1/2 in)
- Spouse: Iosif Goldman
- Parent(s): Gurgen Terteryan (father); Tamara Terteryanova (mother)
- Website: dolores.ru

Dolores Gurgenovna Kondrashova (Russian: Доло́рес Гурге́новна Кондрашо́ва; 24 November 1936 – 23 January 2023) was a Soviet and Russian hairdresser and designer. She was an honored Art Worker of the Russian Federation (2002), and an honored worker of consumer services of the population of the Russian Federation (1987).

== Biography ==
Dolores Kondrashova was the daughter of Gurgen Terteryan, theater-director of the concert association of Baku. After the death of her father, she, along with her mother and sister, arrived in Moscow. There she became interested in and devoted herself to the art of hairdressing.

From 1971 to 1989, she was head of the Laboratory of Hair Modeling at the Ministry of Consumer Services. From 1971 until her retirement, she was the head coach of hairdressing team of Russia. In 1998 at the hairdressing world championship Hairworld in Seoul, the Russian team won the world championship title for the first time.

At the Congress of the World Organization of Hairdressers (OMC), held in the summer of 2006, Kondrashova was re-elected president of the OMC Eastern European Zone.

She was married to process engineer Iosif Goldman (1937 – 2020).

== Personal life ==
Her first husband was officer Leonid Kondrashov.

Her second husband was Iosif Adolfovich Goldman (1937–2020).

She had no children.

== Awards ==
- Order of the Badge of Honour (1971)
- Order of the Red Banner of Labour (1976)
- Medal "Veteran of Labour" (1990)
- Order of Friendship (1997)
- Medal "In Commemoration of the 850th Anniversary of Moscow"
- Order of Honour (2009)
- Legion of Honour
