= 2023 in Spain =

- Decades: 2000s; 2010s; 2020s; 2030s
- See also: History of Spain; Timeline of Spanish history; List of years in Spain

Events in the year 2023 in Spain.

== Incumbents ==
- Monarch: Felipe VI
- Prime Minister: Pedro Sánchez
- President of the Congress of Deputies:
  - Meritxell Batet (until 16 August)
  - Francina Armengol (from 17 August)
- President of the Senate of Spain:
  - Ander Gil (until 16 August)
  - Pedro Rollán (from 17 August)
- President of the Supreme Court: Francisco Marín Castán (acting)
- President of the Constitutional Court:
  - Pedro González-Trevijano (until 9 January)
  - Cándido Conde-Pumpido (from 12 January)
- Attorney General: Álvaro García Ortiz
- Chief of the Defence Staff: Teodoro Esteban López Calderón
- Sánchez II Government

=== Regional presidents ===
- Andalusia: Juan Manuel Moreno Bonilla
- Aragón:
  - Javier Lambán (until 11 August)
  - Jorge Azcón (from 11 August)
- Asturias: Adrián Barbón
- Balearic Islands:
  - Francina Armengol (until 20 June)
  - Mae de la Concha (acting, 19 June – 7 July)
  - Marga Prohens (from 7 July)
- Basque Country: Iñigo Urkullu
- Canary Islands:
  - Ángel Víctor Torres (until 12 July)
  - Fernando Clavijo Batlle (from 12 July)
- Cantabria:
  - Miguel Ángel Revilla (until 5 July)
  - María José Sáenz de Buruaga (from 5 July)
- Castilla–La Mancha: Emiliano García-Page
- Castile and León: Alfonso Fernández Mañueco
- Catalonia: Pere Aragonès
- Extremadura:
  - Guillermo Fernández Vara (until 14 July)
  - María Guardiola (from 14 July)
- Galicia: Alfonso Rueda
- La Rioja:
  - Concha Andreu (until 29 June)
  - Gonzalo Capellán (from 29 June)
- Community of Madrid: Isabel Díaz Ayuso
- Region of Murcia: Fernando López Miras
- Navarre: María Chivite
- Valencian Community:
  - Ximo Puig (until 13 July)
  - Carlos Mazón (from 13 July)
- Ceuta: Juan Jesús Vivas
- Melilla:
  - Eduardo de Castro (until 7 July)
  - Juan José Imbroda (from 7 July)

== Events ==
=== January ===
- 4 January – The Supreme Court of Spain says that it will investigate two sons of Teodoro Obiang Nguema Mbasogo, president of Equatorial Guinea over the kidnapping and torture of two Spanish citizens who oppose Obiang's rule.
- 18 January – The People's Party President of Castile and León Alfonso Fernández Mañueco rejects anti-abortion proposals by coalition partner Vox.
- 25 January – Algeciras church attacks: One person is killed and four others are wounded when a man wielding a machete breaks into two churches in Algeciras, Andalusia, in attacks treated as Islamic terrorism by authorities. A Moroccan illegal immigrant is arrested.

=== March ===
- 9 March – Three people are killed after a mine tunnel collapses in Catalonia.
- 22 March – 2023 vote of no confidence in the government of Pedro Sánchez: Spanish Prime Minister Pedro Sánchez's government survives a second vote of no confidence presented by far-right party Vox, with independent Ramón Tamames as its candidate.

=== May ===
- 28 May
  - 2023 Spanish local elections
  - 2023 Spanish regional elections

=== July ===
- 2 July – The Government of Gonzalo Capellán is sworn in in La Rioja.
- 23 July – 2023 Spanish general election

=== August ===
- 12 August – The Azcón government is sworn in.
- 15 August – 2023 Tenerife wildfire, the worst in the Canary Islands in 40 years.
- 20 August – 2023 FIFA Women's World Cup: Spain win 1–0 against England in the final of the tournament.

=== September ===
- 8 September – Spain has become more reliant on Russian natural gas, according to government data. Russia's market share of total imports increased to 28 percent in July, surpassing Algeria as Spain's second largest gas supplier.

=== October ===
- 28 October – Prime Minister Sánchez announced during the 2023 Spanish government formation that he had agreed to back an amnesty law, to comprise all those involved in the controversial 2017 Catalan independence referendum and the subsequent constitutional crisis, while acknowledging that this was a u-turn on his previous stance to regard the amnesty as unlawful because it was necessary "in the interest of Spain and in defense of coexistence between Spaniards". after this the 2023 Spanish protests started.
- 30 October – FIFA bars former Royal Spanish Football Federation president Luis Rubiales from all football-related activities for three years after having acted inappropriately during the 2023 FIFA Women's World Cup final in August.

=== November ===
- 9 November – Politician from Vox Alejo Vidal-Quadras Roca is shot in the face in Madrid during an Assassination attempt.
- 16 November – 24th Annual Latin Grammy Awards

=== December ===
- 15 December – Fourteen workers at Tenerife South Airport were arrested on suspicion of stealing items from checked-in luggage. Police seized allegedly stolen items worth almost two million euros.

== Deaths ==
=== January ===
- 3 January
  - Elena Huelva, 20, influencer and writer.
  - Nicolás Redondo, 95, union leader and politician, secretary general of the UGT (1976–1994) and deputy (1977–1987).
  - Sergi Schaaff, 85, television producer (Saber y ganar, Ruta Quetzal).
- 5 January
  - Toni Batllori, 71–72, cartoonist.
  - Mondeño, 88, torero.
- 10 January
  - Jorge Ballesteros, 39, sports shooter.
  - José Evangelista, 79, composer.
- 11 January – Eduardo Amorós, 79, Olympic equestrian (1976).
- 17 January – Josep Rahola i d'Espona, 104, engineer and politician, senator (1979–1986).
- 20 January – Xavier Albó, 88, Jesuit priest, linguist and anthropologist.
- 23 January – Eugenio Martín, 97, film director (Bad Man's River, The Ugly Ones, Horror Express) and screenwriter.
- 24 January – Mònica Miquel Serdà, 60, politician, deputy (2003–2004).
- 25 January – José Javier Viñes Rueda, 85, politician, senator (1989–1993), Navarre MP (1983–1991, 1999–2003).
- 26 January – Rodolfo Ares, 68, politician, member of the Basque Parliament (1994–2009, 2012–2016).
- 27 January – Gerard Escoda, 50, footballer (Reus, Villarreal) and sporting director (CE Sabadell).
- 30 January
  - Fernando Elboj Broto, 76, teacher and politician, senator (1982–1989, 2008–2011).
  - Alexis Ravelo, 51, Spanish writer.

=== February ===
- 3 February
  - Paco Rabanne, 88, fashion designer.
  - Juan Velarde, 95, economist and academic.
- 9 February – Marcos Alonso, 63, football player (Barcelona, Atlético Madrid, national team) and manager.
- 12 February – Ramón Palacios Rubio, 102, engineer and politician, senator (1996–2000).
- 13 February – José María Gil-Robles, 87, politician, president of the European Parliament (1997–1999).
- 17 February – Pansequito, 78, flamenco singer, brain cancer.
- 21 February
  - Amancio, 83, football player (Real Madrid, national team) and manager (Real Madrid).
  - Ricardo García García-Ochoa, 78, lawyer and politician, member of the Cortes of Castile and León (1987–1991).
- 27 February
  - Eduardo Burguete, 61, Olympic pentathlete (1984).
  - Juan Muñoz Martín, 93, children's author (El Barco de Vapor).
- 28 February – Pelayo Novo, 32, footballer (Oviedo, Elche).

=== March ===
- 3 March – Francisco J. Ayala, 88, Spanish-American evolutionary biologist and philosopher.
- 7 March – Salvador García-Bodaño, 87, poet, member of the Royal Galician Academy (since 1992).
- 10 March
  - Juan Francisco García Sánchez, 86, judge, magistrate of the Supreme Court (1999–2006).
  - Rafael de Mendizábal Allende, 95, judge, president of the National Court (1977–1986, 1991–1992) and magistrate of the Constitutional Court (1992–2001).
- 12 March – Jaume Medina, 73, philologist.
- 14 March – Ángel Floro Martínez, 83, Roman Catholic prelate, bishop of Gokwe (2000–2017).
- 15 March – Fèlix Millet, 87, businessman and convicted fraudster.
- 17 March – Laura Valenzuela, 92, television presenter (TVE) and actress (Spaniards in Paris, Growing Leg, Diminishing Skirt).
- 18 March – Pedro Solbes, 80, economist, twice minister of economy and finance, European Commissioner for Economic and Monetary Affairs (1999–2004) and second deputy prime minister (2004–2009).
- 22 March – Teresa Sempere Jaén, 75, politician, deputy (1989–1996).
- 25 March – Lucinda Urrusti, 94, Spanish-Mexican artist.
- 30 March – Laura Gómez-Lacueva, 48, actress (Chrysalis, Uncertain Glory, The Realm).
- 31 March – Antonio Martorell Lacave, 62, naval officer, chief of staff of the Navy (since 2021).

=== April ===
- 2 April – Pedro Lavirgen, 92, tenor.
- 6 April
  - Juanjo Ferreiro Suárez, 79, union leader and politician, member of the Parliament of Catalonia (1980–1984) and City Council of Barcelona (1983–1995).
  - Josep Piqué, 68, businessman and politician, minister of foreign affairs (2000–2002) and twice of industry, chairman of Vueling (2007–2013).
- 10 April – Fernando Sánchez Dragó, 86, writer and journalist.
- 14 April – Juan Avilés Farré, 73, historian.
- 20 April – Josep Maria Fusté, 82, footballer (Barcelona, Hércules, national team).
- 27 April – Ramiro Oliveros, 82, actor (Cannibal Apocalypse, Naked Therapy, Death's Newlyweds).

=== May ===
- 2 May – Ruth Porta, 66, politician, senator (2007–2011).
- 3 May – Francisco Paesa, 87, spy, banker and businessman.
- 4 May – Rafael Guillén, 90, poet.
- 5 May – Jesús Mancha, 81, politician, senator (1996–2000), deputy (2000–2008).
- 14 May – Ferran Olivella, 86, footballer (CD Condal, Barcelona, national team).
- 16 May – Iñaki Alkiza, 89, politician and footballer (Hernani, Real Sociedad), mayor of San Sebastián (1979).
- 19 May – Arturo Grávalos, 25, road racing cyclist.
- 21 May – Victoriano Sánchez Arminio, 80, football referee.
- 27 May – Màrius Díaz, 89, politician, mayor of Badalona (1979–1983) and member of the Parliament of Catalonia (1984–1988).

=== June ===
- 6 June – Virginia Marí, 60, politician, mayor of Ibiza (2014–2015) and member of the Parliament of the Balearic Islands (2019–2023)
- 8 June – Domingo Perurena, 79, road racing cyclist.
- 11 June – Jesús Ruiz Fernández, politician, deputy (1986–1989)
- 14 June
  - Joaquín Espert, 84, politician, president of La Rioja (1987–1990).
  - Jordi Porta i Ribalta, 86, Spanish Catalan cultural activist, president of Òmnium Cultural (2002–2010).
- 15 June – Antonio Jiménez Quiles, 88, road cyclist.
- 25 June – José Antonio Sistiaga, 91, filmmaker.
- 27 June – Carmen Sevilla, 92, actress (Vengeance, Don Juan, King of Kings), singer and dancer.

=== July ===
- 5 July – Andrés Oliva, 74, racing cyclist.
- 9 July – Luis Suárez, 88, football player (Barcelona, Inter Milan, national team) and manager.
- 11 July – Mercedes Luzuriaga, 95, actress (Camera Café).
- 15 July – Francisco Ibáñez Talavera, 87, comic book artist (Mort & Phil, 13, Rue del Percebe, Rompetechos).
- 20 July – Concha García Zaera, 93, digital artist.
- 25 July – Antonio Porpetta, 87, writer and poet.
- 27 July – Didier Lourenço, 55, painter.

=== August ===
- 2 August – Ramón Lobo, 68, journalist (El País).
- 4 August – Carmen Xtravaganza, 62, Spanish-American model and singer, depicted in Paris is Burning.
- 5 August – Xavier Gabriel Lliset, 66, lottery businessman.
- 8 August – Federico Bahamontes, 95, road racing cyclist, Tour de France winner (1959).
- 13 August – Constantino Méndez, 72, politician, secretary of state for defence (2008–2011) and deputy (1993–1996).
- 16 August – Mariano Moreno García, 84, Roman Catholic prelate, bishop of Cafayate (2008–2014).
- 17 August – Guillermo Timoner, 97, racing cyclist, six-time UCI Motor-paced world champion.
- 23 August – José Luis Álvarez, 93, politician, mayor of Madrid (1978–1979), minister of transport (1980–1981) and agriculture (1981–1982).
- 25 August – José Calavera Ruiz, 91, civil engineer (Fuente Dé cable car) and academic.

=== September ===
- 1 September
  - Amando de Miguel, 86, sociologist.
  - Carme Junyent, 68, Catalan linguist.
- 5 September – María Teresa Campos, 82, journalist and television presenter.
- 7 September – María Jiménez, 73, singer.
- 12 September – Roser Amadó, 79, architect (La Vila Olímpica del Poblenou).
- 14 September – Antoni Vila Casas, 92, pharmaceutical executive and philanthropist, founder of Fundació Vila Casas.
- 17 September – Pepe Domingo Castaño, 80, radio (Carrusel Deportivo) and television presenter (300 millones), singer and writer.

=== October ===
- 16 October – Jesús Guzmán, 97, actor.

=== December ===
- 2 December – Concha Velasco, 84, actress.
- 8 December – Itziar Castro, 46, actress.
