= José Javier =

José Javier may refer to:

- José Javier Arqués (born 1960), Spanish retired sprinter
- José Javier Cortez (born 1995), Ecuadorian footballer
- José Javier Curto Gines (born 1964), Spanish boccia player
- José Javier Eguiguren (1816–1884), Ecuadorian politician
- José Javier Esparza Torres (born 1963), Spanish journalist, essayist, and cultural critic
- José Javier Gómez (born 1974), Spanish racing cyclist
- José Javier Hombrados (born 1972), Spanish former handball player
- Jose Javier Mejia Palacio (born 1964), Colombian painter
- José Javier Palomo Nieto, Salvadoran politician
- José Javier Pomés Ruiz (born 1952), Spanish politician
- Jose Javier Reyes (born 1954), Filipino director, screenwriter, lyricist, actor, and professor
- José Javier Robles Belmonte, full name of Javi Robles (born 2000), Spanish footballer
- José Javier Rodríguez (Puerto Rican politician), Puerto Rican politician and former mayor
- José Javier Rodríguez (Florida politician) (born 1978), American politician and attorney
- José Javier Rubio Gómez, full name of Javi Rubio (footballer, born 1984), Spanish former footballer
- José Javier Serrano, real name of Yosigo (born 1981), Spanish fine art photographer
- José Javier Villafráz Quintero (born 1980), Venezuelan football manager and former player
- José Javier Viñes Rueda (1937–2023), Spanish doctor and politician
- José Javier Zubillaga Martínez (born 1959), Spanish retired footballer
