= Jesús Ruiz =

Jesús Ruiz may refer to:

- Jesús Ruiz (politician) (died 2023), Spanish politician
- Jesús Ruiz (boxer) (born 1990), Mexican boxer
- Jesús Ruiz (footballer) (born 1997), Spanish footballer

== See also ==
- María Jesús Ruiz (born 1982), Spanish actress, model and Miss Spain 2024
