= 2023 Algeciras church attacks =

2023 attacks in Andalusia, Spain

Algeciras church attack
- Location: Algeciras, Andalusia, Spain
- Date: 25 January 2023
- Attack type: Mass stabbing
- Weapon: Machete
- Deaths: 1
- Injuries: 4
- Perpetrator: Yassine Kanjaa
- Motive: Mental disorder

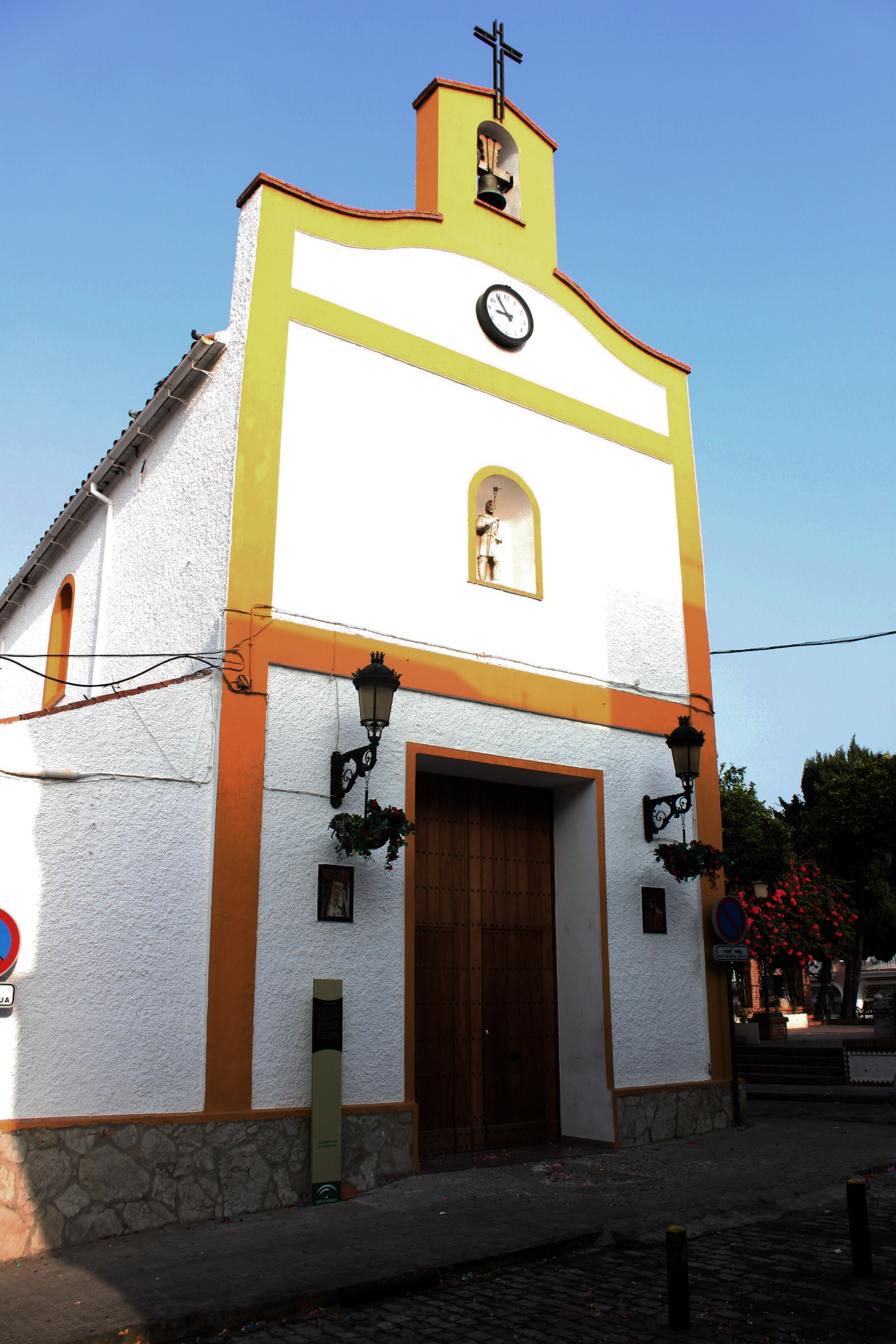
San Isidro church, where a parish priest was wounded

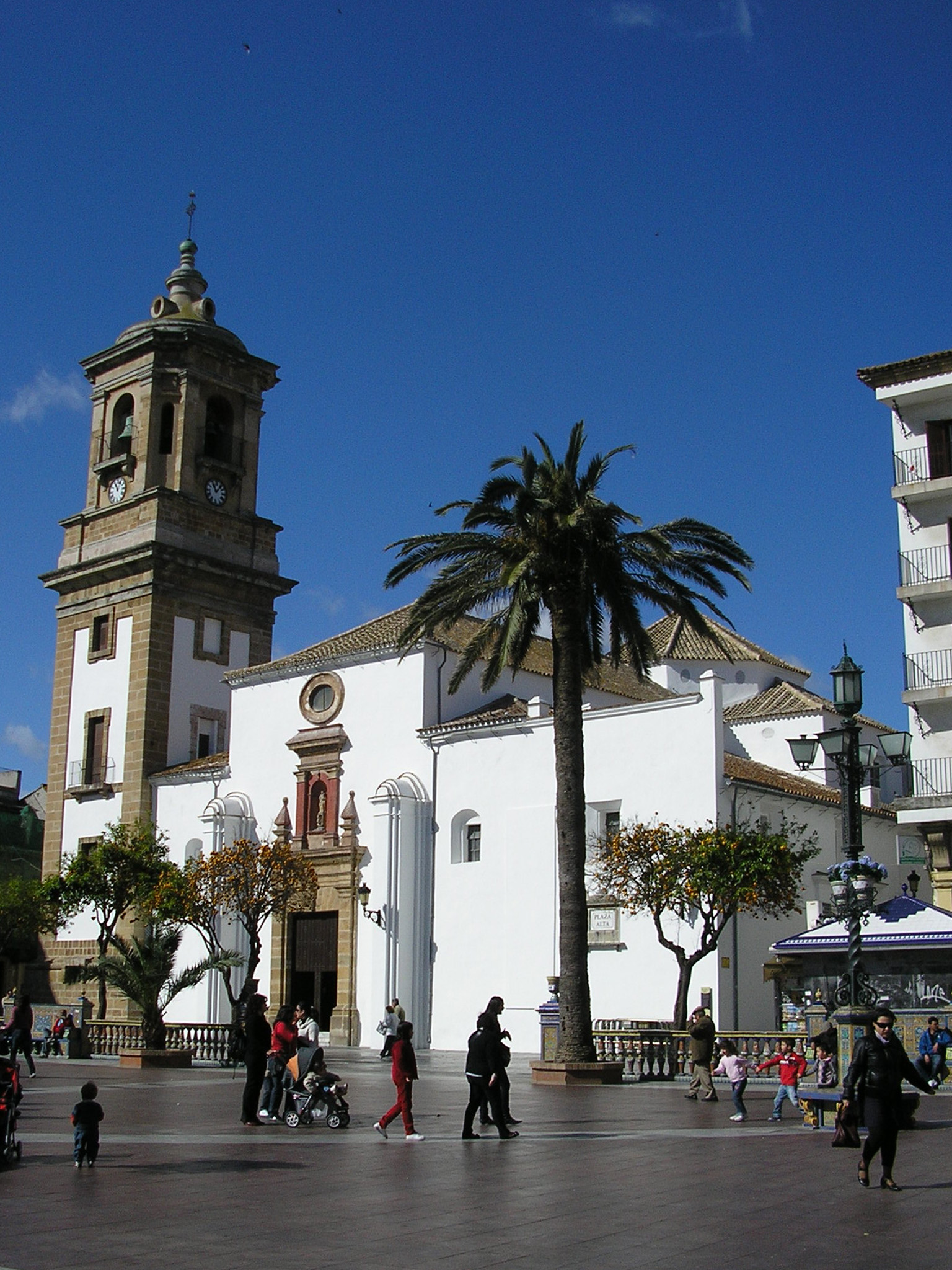
La Palma church and the Plaza Alta, where a sexton was killed and three people wounded

On 25 January 2023, a sexton was killed and four people, including a parish priest, were injured in a machete attack at two churches in Algeciras in the Spanish region of Andalusia. Police arrested Yassine Kanjaa, a 25-year-old Moroccan who had been living undocumented in Spain since 2019 and was under orders to leave. The attack was treated as Islamic terrorism by the Audiencia Nacional. In November 2025, Kanjaa was acquitted of murder due to his mental disorder, and sent to a secure psychiatric facility for a maximum of 30 years.

== Attack ==
According to the Ministry of the Interior, Kanjaa entered the San Isidro church at 19:00 and began trying to convert the congregation to Islam. He left and returned 20 minutes later with a machete, and began destroying Christian imagery. When the parish priest Antonio Rodríguez ordered him to leave, he stabbed him in the shoulder and neck. Rodríguez received surgery and his condition was described as stable.

Kanjaa then went to La Palma church, 200 metres away, and continued destroying Christian icons. When the sexton Diego Valencia ordered him to leave, he chased the official onto the Plaza Alta square by the city hall, where he stabbed and beat him to death. Three more people were wounded while trying to stop the violence.

== Perpetrator ==
Kanjaa, an unmarried 25-year-old, lived in the villages of Belyounech and Oued El Marsa near Tangier. According to neighbours, he never had a steady job and was known for petty theft and hashish use. Neighbours said that Kanjaa's father had a mental illness, but had never held radical views; he was held in a psychiatric hospital on two occasions, though his diagnosis is unknown due to medical privacy. Kanjaa himself was monitored by mental health services in Morocco but was never sent to an institution.

In August 2019, Kanjaa crossed the Strait of Gibraltar illegally on a jetski, landing in Gibraltar. He was detained for three days and deported back to Morocco. He made his way over the strait again, landing in Spain, and lived in a squat in Algeciras with two other undocumented migrants. These flatmates described him as violent and unstable, as well as obsessed with religion. Unable to work, he lived off charity and did not socialise, not even with the city's Moroccan community. In June 2022, the National Police discovered his irregular status, and the Ministry of the Interior ordered his expulsion.

Two weeks before the church attacks, Kanjaa was involved in two disturbances at local mosques when he took issue with the officials. After finishing evening prayer at a mosque in La Marina, he became furious when it was being closed for the night, as he believed that mosques should never close their doors. He began shouting and pushing before being expelled. At a larger mosque on Calle Miguel Martín, he became furious when children began to run and shout upon leaving their classes at the madrasa; he complained to the imam, who dismissed his complaints.

Minutes before the church attacks, Kanjaa launched an unprovoked beating on a 20-year-old Moroccan stranger whom he accused of "working for magic" and betraying Islam. The victim had his glasses broken and required stitches.

== Investigation ==
Investigations on Kanjaa's mobile phone found that he was in contact with jihadists in Tangier and Ceuta.

On 30 January 2023, the Audiencia Nacional charged Kanjaa with murder and terrorism. It classed his acts as jihadism against Catholics and against Muslims who he considered to be heretics. He was remanded in custody with no chance of bail. He admitted to acting alone.

The Audiencia National acquitted Kanjaa of murder, due to his psychosis and schizophrenia, on 28 November 2025. He was sent to a secure psychiatric facility for a maximum of 30 years. He was ordered to pay €150,000 to sexton Diego Valencia's widow, and €50,000 to each of their two children. He also had to pay €17,000 to the next of kin of priest Antonio Rodríguez, who had since died of unrelated causes, and €3,700 to the fellow Moroccan he had assaulted.

On 10 April 2026, the appeals circuit of the Audiencia National upheld the 2025 verdict.

== Reactions ==
The attack was condemned by leading politicians including prime minister of Spain Pedro Sánchez, leader of the opposition Alberto Núñez Feijóo, and President of the Regional Government of Andalusia Juanma Moreno. Vox politicians made statements against illegal immigration, with leader Santiago Abascal writing that "Islamism is already on our land because some open the gates to them, others finance them and we Spaniards suffer the consequences"; these statements were condemned as exploitative by other parties including the People's Party. The attack was condemned by local Moroccans and Muslims.

It was reported on 26 January that leading politicians of the Unidas Podemos coalition forming part of the Spanish government had not made any statement on the attack, with the exception of the condemnation by deputy prime minister Yolanda Díaz. Minister of equality Irene Montero, minister of social rights Ione Belarra, Podemos founder Pablo Iglesias and the party's congressional spokesperson Pablo Echenique made no statement on the attack, despite being active on Twitter on those days.

Diego Valencia's funeral was held at his church on 27 January, with mourners including Juanma Moreno, mayor José Ignacio Landaluce and Bishop of Cádiz and Ceuta Rafael Zornoza. Zornoza said "He died for his faith and proclaiming his faith. The Lord will take him in his glory". In November 2023, Father Juan José Marina contacted the Diocese of Cádiz and Ceuta to request the beginning of the process of beatification of Diego Valencia as a martyr in odium fidei.

== See also ==
- 2023 in Spain
- Islam and mental health
- Terrorism in Spain
