= Broto (surname) =

Broto is a Spanish surname. Notable people with the surname include:

- Carmen Broto (1922–1949), Spanish prostitute whose murder shocked Spain
- Domingo Broto (1903–1960), Spanish footballer
- Fernando Elboj Broto (1946–2023), Spanish politician and schoolteacher
- Javier Sánchez Broto (born 1971), Spanish retired footballer
- José Manuel Broto Gimeno (born 1949), Spanish painter

== See also ==
- Broto
- Losmen Bu Broto, Indonesian drama film
