= Islam and mental health =

Despite a rich history of mental health advancements in the Islamic world, particularly during its Renaissance from the eighth to the thirteenth century, there is a dearth of mental health utilization among Muslims, particularly in the West. As the fastest growing religion in the United States, and the minority group with the highest likelihood of facing psychosocial insult, researchers have identified culturally-incompetent mental health care as one of the major obstacles preventing Muslims from seeking or continuing care. Work is being done by clinicians, researchers and other Muslim mental health advocates to draw from a robust, religiously aligned, historical body of Islamic health sciences work and contemporary medical and psychotherapeutic techniques to create an integrative model suitable to the modern day Muslim.

== History ==
The body of classical Islamic literature on psychology and mental health can be categorized into three distinct categories:

The largest and most robust source, Sufi literature and teachings, includes the prominent Islamic philosopher al-Ghazali. "Mental health" is related to the health of the "soul", the "spiritual heart", or one's "core". As all action ultimately stems from the spiritual heart, its soundness is paramount to the health of the physical body and use of our faculties, including one's mental faculties or intellect (‘aql). Practices related to maintaining the health of the soul include prayer (salat), recitation of Quran (al-Ruqyah), remembrance of Allah (zikr), charity (sadaqa), spiritual conversations, proper diet, examining oneself and developing insight (muraqaba), and more.

The second body of work is from advancements made in medicine and the health sciences during the Islamic renaissance from the 8th to 13th century. Muslim medical practitioners and physicians drew upon and further developed the humoral system of the Greeks. The 9th-century Persian geographer and physician, Abu Zayd al-Balkhi's works belong to this discipline.

The branch of Islamic philosophy related to ethics and self-management comprises the last category. This includes practical methods to change one's behavior and rational processing to shift one's mental perceptions related to oneself.

Someone who helped evolve this multi-tier approach was the 9th-century philosopher and physician, Abū Bakr Muhammad ibn Zakarīyā al-Rāzī. His most prominent work, Al-Ḥāwī fī al-ṭibb, refuted the commonly held belief in both the Islamic and European worlds that psychiatric illness stemmed solely from demonic possession. He instead applied the health sciences framework of his profession, using the humoral system commonly used by physicians at that time, particularly emphasizing disturbances in the black bile humor as contributing to psychiatric illness. He also opposed the principle of the mind-body division supported by Greek philosophers, Socrates and Aristotle, pointing out instead that one's cognitive states influence the health of the body and vice-versa. al-Rāzī particularly studied the relevance of this connection in cases of Melancholia. Modeling a psychotherapeutic approach similar to cognitive behavioral therapy, al-Rāzī posited that "talking to patients and countering faulty thinking" could be treatment enough without medication. al-Rāzī also created a system of classifying symptomatology and diagnostic criteria dealing with obsessions, delusions, phobias, and more. After being appointed head physician of a hospital in what is now Iran, he created a center for the mentally ill, delivering psychiatric care with a prominent "aftercare program" that assisted patients economically and socially.

== Sufi traditions ==
Conceptions of the human body in Islam are derived from the Greek system of senses of humor (blood, bile, black bile, and phlegm) and their imbalances. A medicine's function then is to correct these imbalances. These senses of humor themselves are then related to the qualities: of cold, hot, dry, and moist (tied to the elements of air, fire, water, and earth). Generally, medicines are usually derived from plants but can be from animals or minerals. Although fasting and prayer can be prescribed to purify the body as well.

Islamic medicine prefers not to make a distinction between psychic and physical illness as it sees the human being as a whole. Both the soul and body must be in harmony to promote health for each. However, for practical consideration of illness, categorization is made between sicknesses of the heart (the soul's center) and sicknesses of the body.

Sicknesses of the heart are subdivided into two types: the sickness of uncertainty and doubt, and the sickness of desire and temptation. "Wrong action is like poison to the heart. If it does not quite destroy it, it inevitably weakens it; when its power is thus weakened, it cannot withstand diseases," ‘Abd-Allah b. al-Mubarak relates. "I saw how sins bring death to hearts. Addiction to them is but disgrace. Renouncing sins is life for hearts. Defying yourself is your best path.". "Desire is the greatest of its illnesses and opposing this is the strongest of its remedies. The self in its original state, is created ignorant and sinful... and thinks that its healing lies in following its desire and appetites; yet therein lies only its destruction and ruin... considers its illness as if it were a remedy and relies upon it, while it considers the remedy as though it were the illness and avoids it. From both its preference for the disease and its avoidance of the remedy there are generated various kinds of sicknesses and illnesses which baffle the physicians, and with these healing is impossible.

== Islamic health sciences perspective ==
Sicknesses of the body are also subdivided into two categories: that which is corrected by using "opposites" to restore the proper balance (for example, using medicines with "cold" qualities if heat is causing malady); the second involves correction via thought and reflection. Bodily illnesses can be a result of an imbalance where the material cause is no longer present as well as an imbalance where the material cause is still in effect. Treatment of the latter involves removing the material cause. Illnesses of specific organs can occur as well as the body as a whole.

Tenet's underlying treatment of bodily illness includes preservation of health, protection from harm, and removal of harmful substances. Generally, there are ten things when an imbalance or restraint can cause illness: blood, semen, urine, feces, wind, vomiting, sneezing, sleep, hunger, thirst. Generally, fasting and being spare in food and drink is prescribed for maintaining the health of the body. The health of the heart is brought about by removing wrong actions or sins.

Some Muslim women attribute symptoms of mental illnesses such as depression, anxiety, psychosis, or hallucinations to possession by jinn, supernatural beings recognized in Islamic tradition. Cultural and religious explanatory models lead them to seek spiritual remedies like ruqyah instead of psychiatric care.

== Current directions ==
There is an effort to increase participation in and utilization of mental health services among Muslims using culturally and religiously competent empirical methods. A multi-tier approach integrating historical Islamic models and contemporary medical and psychotherapeutic techniques is advancing and disseminating. Stanford University's Muslim Mental Health Lab, headed by Dr. Rania Awaad, is beginning to tackle this gap in healthcare quality and access. Recent research has also looked specifically at grief and depression management according to Islamic teachings, with some interesting methods of dealing with these debilitating mental health problems.

== See also ==
- Mental health in Palestine
