= Josep Rahola i d'Espona =

Spanish engineer and politician (1918–2023)

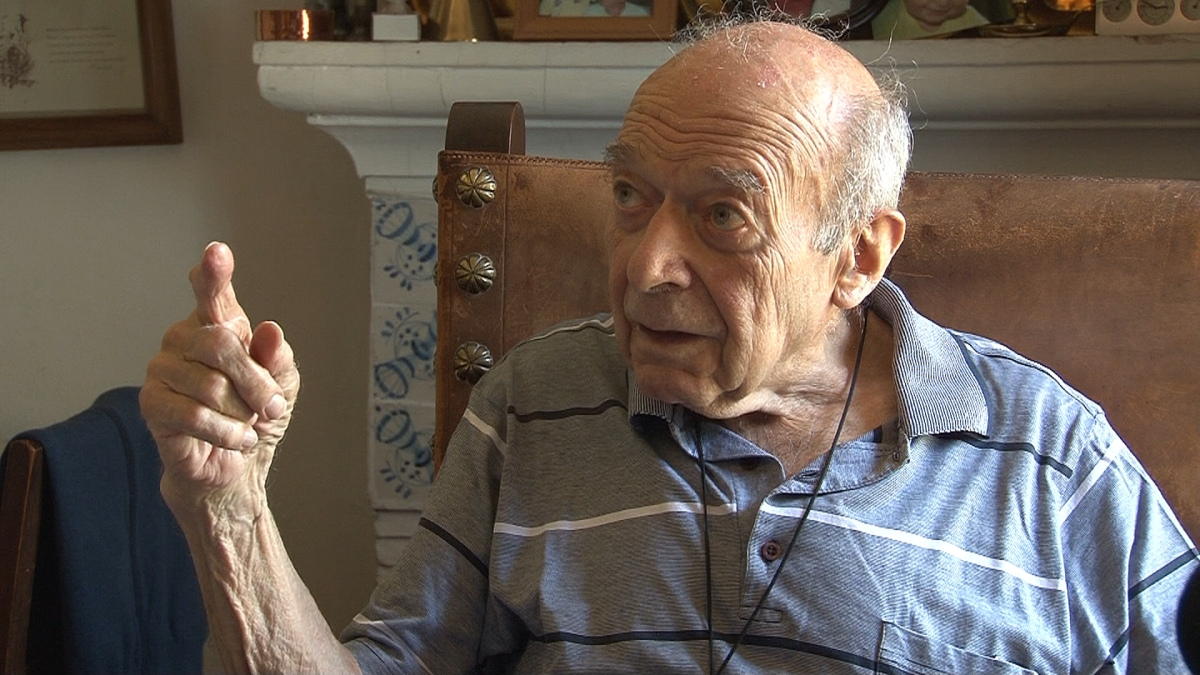
- Rahola in 2013

Member of the Senate of Spain
- In office 1 March 1979 – 23 April 1986
- Constituency: Girona

Personal details
- Born: 3 July 1918 Barcelona, Spain
- Died: 17 January 2023 (aged 104) Fortià, Spain
- Party: ERC
- Education: Mútua Escolar Blanquerna
- Occupation: Engineer

Josep Rahola i d'Espona (3 July 1918 – 17 January 2023) was a Spanish engineer and politician. A member of the Republican Left of Catalonia, he served in the Senate from 1979 to 1986.

Rahola died in Fortià on 17 January 2023, at the age of 104.
