= Virginia Marí =

Spanish politician (1962–2023)

Member of the Parliament of the Balearic Islands
- In office 26 May 2019 – 28 May 2023

Mayor of Ibiza
- In office 10 August 2014 – June 2015
- Preceded by: Pilar Marí Torres
- Succeeded by: Rafa Ruiz

Personal details
- Born: October 1962 Gemena, Republic of the Congo
- Died: 6 June 2023 (aged 60) Ibiza, Balearic Islands, Spain
- Party: People's Party
- Education: Autonomous University of Barcelona

Virginia Marí Rennesson (October 1962 – 6 June 2023) was a Spanish politician, fisheries inspector, marketer, and public relations manager. She served as the mayor of the city of Ibiza from 2014 to 2015 and a regional deputy in the Parliament of the Balearic Islands, representing Ibiza, from May 2019 until May 2023.

Marí, who became Ibiza's first fisheries inspector, created the Peix Nostrum brand of sustainable seafood in 2008, which specifically identifies fish caught by the Fishermen's Associations of Ibiza and Sant Antoni (las Cofradías de Pescadores de Ibiza y Sant Antoni) in the waters surrounding Ibiza.

== Biography ==
Marí, the third of five children of Antoni Marí Calbet and French-born Maryse Rennesson, was born in October 1962 in the city of Gemena, Republic of the Congo (present-day Democratic Republic of the Congo). (Her four siblings were Beatriz, José, Alicia and Daniel.) The family lived in the Republic of the Congo for a decade while her father worked in Gemena as a doctor for the World Health Organization after studying tropical medicine in Antwerp, Belgium. Antoni Marí Calbet, later served as the President of the Island Council of Ibiza and Formentera, the now-defunct self-governing council of both islands, from 1987 to 1999.

Virginia Marí received a degree in information sciences and marketing from the Autonomous University of Barcelona. She then worked as a press relations, marketer, and public relations manager for a film production company in Barcelona.

Marí became a fisheries inspector on Ibiza from 1994 until her death in 2023. She began her career as an inspector for the Balearic Islands Government from 1994 until 2000. In 2000, Marí became the fisheries inspector for the Island Council of Ibiza and Formentera and then its successor, the Island Council of Ibiza. She was Ibiza's first fisheries inspector in the island's history. In 2008, Marí created the Peix Nostrum seafood brand, which identifies fish and other seafood caught by the Fishermen's Associations of Ibiza and Sant Antoni (las Cofradías de Pescadores de Ibiza y Sant Antoni).

Marí also served as secretary of the monitoring commission for the Freus Marine Reserve of Ibiza and Formentera from its creation in 1999 until June 2023.

=== Politics ===
Virginia Marí entered Ibiza elected politics in the 2010s during a turbulent time in the town's political history. First elected to the Ibiza city council in 2011, Marí's two predecessors as mayor, Marienna Sánchez-Jáuregui and Pilar Marí Torres, who were both members of Marí's own People's Party (PP), had resigned after short tenures in office. Marí's father, politician Antoni Marí Calbet, personally advised her not to run for mayor of Ibiza, though she ignored his advice. Marí was appointed Mayor of Ibiza in 2014 and was sworn into office on 10 August 2014.

As mayor, Marí headed the People's Party (PP) ticket in the 2015 Ibiza municipal elections. Under Marí, the PP won the most votes in the election with 31.26%, followed by the PSOE with 28.83% of the vote, and the Guanyem Eivissa with 16.38%. However, an alliance between the opposition PSOE and the Guanyem Eivissa gave the majority to Rafa Ruiz, who succeeded her as mayor. After leaving the mayor's office, Virginia Marí served opposition leader of the PP in Ibiza's city council.

Marí was elected to the Parliament of the Balearic Islands, representing the Ibiza constituency, in the 2019 Balearic regional election. During her tenure, Marí chaired the Committee on Finance and Budgets, served as the vice president of the Committee on European Affairs and Tourism, and focused on the Balearic government's fishing and marine environmental policies. Marí declined to seek re-election to the regional parliament in the 2023 Balearic regional election, citing her recent diagnosis with lung cancer.

Virginia Marí died from lung cancer at the Hospital Can Misses in Ibiza on 6 June 2023, at the age of 60. She was survived by her partner, José Luis García-Villaraco Suárez, and two sons, Marc and Carlos. Her mother, Maryse Rennesson, who was originally from France, died one week later on 12 June 2023 at the age of 86.
