= Jordi Porta i Ribalta =

Spanish cultural administrator (1936–2023)

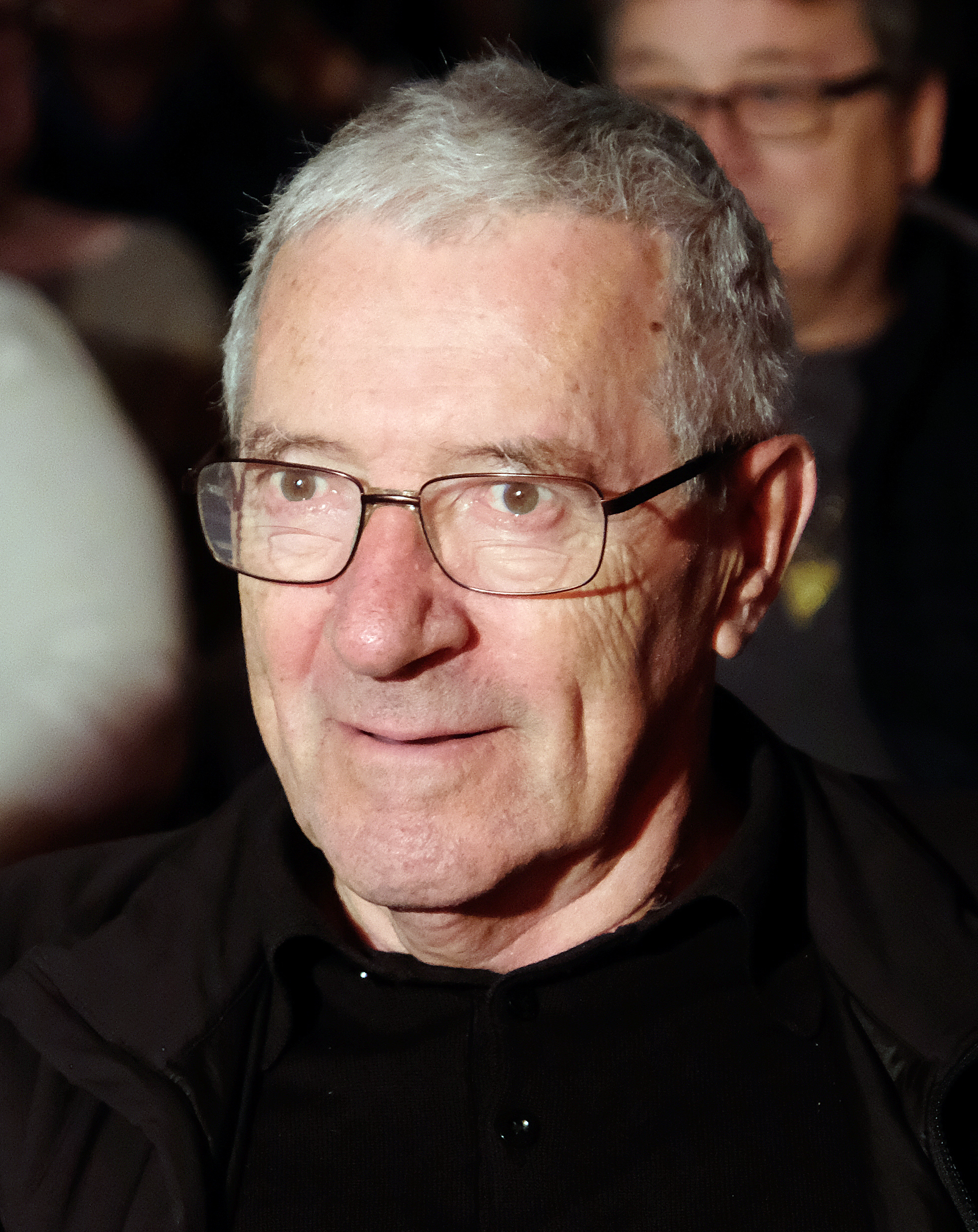
- Porta i Ribalta in 2019
- Born: 1 July 1936; Barcelona, Spain
- Died: 14 June 2023 (aged 86)

Jordi Porta i Ribalta (1 July 1936 – 14 June 2023) was a Spanish cultural administrator and writer.

== Life and career ==
Born in Barcelona, in 1967 Porta graduated in philosophy at the University of Barcelona. In 1971, he became president of the Fundación Jaume Bofill, directing the foundation until 2001. Between 2002 and 2010 he was president of Òmnium Cultural, and between 2000 and 2009 he was Síndic de Greuges (ombudsman) of the Autonomous University of Barcelona. He also served as president of the Enciclopèdia Catalana Foundation (2011–2015) and of the UNESCO Centre of Catalonia (2010–2014). He was also author of several books, best known for the political essay Anys de referència (2010).

During his career Porta received numerous honours and accolades, notably the Creu de Sant Jordi in 2010. He died on 14 June 2023, at the age of 86.
