= Rafael de Mendizábal =

Spanish judge and politician (1927–2023)

Judge of the Constitutional Court of Spain
- In office 1992–2001

President of the Audiencia Nacional
- In office 1991–1992
- In office 1977–1986

Personal details
- Born: Rafael de Mendizábal Allende; 10 August 1927 Jaén, Spain
- Died: 10 March 2023 (aged 95)
- Education: Complutense University of Madrid
- Occupation: Judge

Rafael de Mendizábal Allende (10 August 1927 – 10 March 2023) was a Spanish judge. He served as the first president of the Audiencia Nacional from 1977 to 1986, and again from 1991 to 1992 and was a judge of the Constitutional Court from 1992 to 2001.

Since October 2015, he presided over the Commission of Arbitration, Complaints, and Journalism Ethics, which is under the Federation of Associations of Journalists of Spain (FAPE).

De Mendizábal died on 10 March 2023, at the age of 95.
