= Roser Amadó =

Spanish architect (1944–2023)

- Born: Roser Amadó i Cercós; 22 January 1944; Barcelona, Spain
- Died: 12 September 2023 (aged 79)
- Education: Higher Technical School of Architecture, Barcelona
- Occupation: Architect
- Practice: B01 Arquitectes
- Projects: La Vila Olímpica del Poblenou

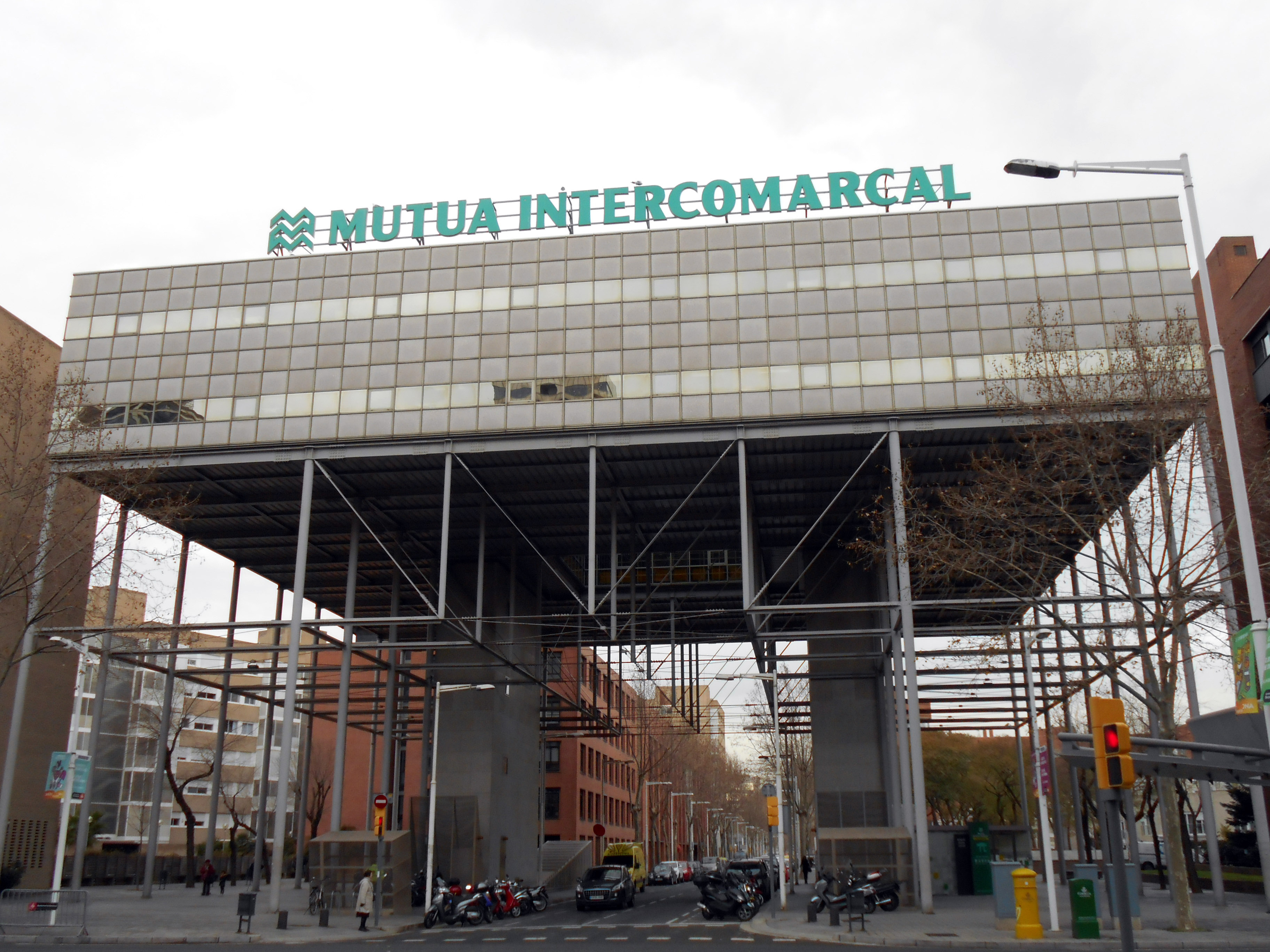
Eurocity 1 office building (1989–1992), by Roser Amadó and Lluís Domènech i Girbau, Barcelona Olympic Village.

Roser Amadó i Cercós (22 January 1944 – 12 September 2023) was a Spanish female architect.

== Biography ==
Roser Amadó i Cercós studied at the Higher Technical School of Architecture of Barcelona, from which she graduated in 1968 with a specialization in Urban Planning and Sustainability.

Together with Lluís Domènech i Girbau, with whom she worked as of 1974, she carried out projects with a functional vision of architecture integrated in the city, and excelled in restoration work and interior design.

Amadó was responsible for the conversion of the Montaner y Simón Editores building into the Fundació Antoni Tàpies (1986–1990) as part of its restoration, and the new headquarters of the Archive of the Crown of Aragon (1990–1993). Along with Lluís Domènech i Girbau, she was also in charge of the historic center of Lleida urban renewal project (1981–1984), consisting of building the Palace of Justice, the Canyeret Communications Tower and elevator, the Cervantes School and Marius Torres Park.

In 1992, for the Olympic Games in Barcelona, she designed the Eurocity 1 (a.k.a. Porta Vila Olímpica) office building (1989–1992) at the Olympic Village (La Vila Olímpica del Poblenou).

Amadó's other works include a residential building at Carrer del Rec Comtal 20, Barcelona (1982–1985), the headquarters of Carburos Metálicos SA (1990–1994), the Honda warehouse in Santa Perpètua de Mogoda (1992–1993), a block of 240 homes at La Maquinista Mall in Barcelona (1999–2000), the Chic & Basic Hotel in Amsterdam (2006–2007), the Casa Semàfor and the Carabineer Riflemen Barracks in El Prat de Llobregat (2006–2009) and the Nuria Espert Theatre in Sant Andreu de la Barca (2004–2010), among others.

In 2001, she founded the firm B01 Arquitectes with Lluís Domènech i Girbau, Ramon Domènech i Girbau, Carles Cortadas, Sander Laudy and Laura Pérez.

Amadó died on 12 September 2023, at the age of 79.
