= Ramón Palacios Rubio =

Spanish politician (1920–2023)

President of the Provincial Deputation of Jaén
- In office 23 February 1967 – 18 January 1976
- Preceded by: Antonio Vázquez de la Torre
- Succeeded by: Miguel Sánchez Cañete Salazar

Member of the Senate of Spain for Jaén
- In office 3 March 1996 – 4 April 2000

Personal details
- Born: 27 February 1920 La Carolina, Spain
- Died: 12 February 2023 (aged 102) Madrid, Spain
- Party: AP; PP
- Occupation: Engineer

Ramón Palacios Rubio (27 February 1920 – 12 February 2023) was a Spanish engineer and politician. A member of the People's Party, he served in the Senate from 1996 to 2000.

Rubio died in Madrid on 12 February 2023, at the age of 102.
