= Teresa Sempere Jaén =

Spanish politician (1947–2023)

Teresa Semepere Jaén

Member of the Congress of Deputies for Alicante
- In office 20 November 1989 – 9 January 1996

Personal details
- Born: María Teresa Sempere Jaén; June 1947 Elche, Spain
- Died: 22 March 2023 (aged 75)
- Party: PSPV–PSOE

María Teresa Sempere Jaén (June 1947 – 22 March 2023) was a Spanish politician. A member of the Socialist Party of the Valencian Country, she served in the Congress of Deputies from 1989 to 1996.

Sempere died on 22 March 2023, at the age of 75.
