= Yosigo =

Spanish photographer (born 1981)

José Javier Serrano (born 1981), better known as Yosigo, is a Spanish fine art photographer. In 2017, he was part of "Un cierto panorama: reciente fotografía de autor en España" ("A Certain Panorama: Recent Author Photography in Spain"), a major exhibition curated by Jesús Micó which showcased the main contemporary Spanish fine art photographers.

He was also co-founder of Have a Nice Book, an online platform about photo-books.

== Publications ==
- Greetings From (2017)
- Riu Avall (2014)
- Ura Begi-Bistan (2013)
- Mapa de Memoria (2011)
- Kresala (2009)
