= Eduardo Amorós =

Spanish equestrian (1943–2023)

Personal information
- Nationality: Spanish
- Born: 25 April 1943; Valencia, Spain
- Died: 11 January 2023 (aged 79); Valencia, Spain

Sport
- Sport: Equestrian

Eduardo Amorós (25 April 1943 – 11 January 2023) was a Spanish equestrian. He competed in two events at the 1976 Summer Olympics.

Amorós died in Valencia on 11 January 2023, at the age of 79.
