= José Javier Mejía =

Colombian painter

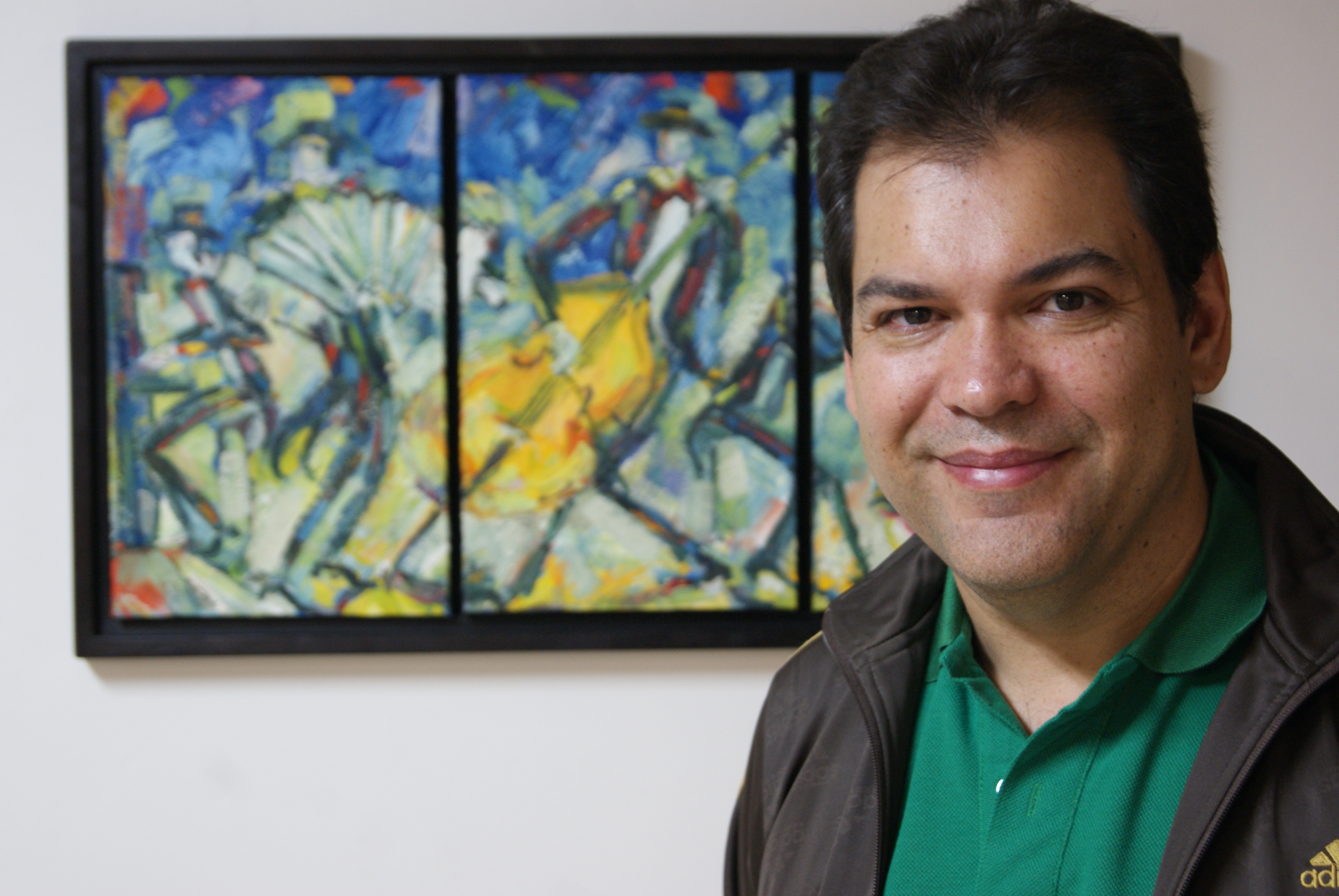
- Born: José Javier Mejía Palacio; May 2, 1964 (age 61); Barranquilla, Colombia
- Known for: Painter
- Movement: Expressionism Abstract
- Spouse: Ana Maria González Restrepo
- Children: Valeria Mejía González
- Awards: Order of Merit Juan del Corral Grade Gold Council of Medellín, The Order of Merit Civic and Business Marshal Jorge Robledo, silver degree granted by the Departmental Assembly of Antioquia, Medal for Peace, Fenalco Antioquia.

José Javier Mejía Palacio (born May 2, 1964) is a Colombian painter. He has also been honored by numerous organizations such as: The Medal Peace Fenalco, Antioquia in recognition of the social work with children who participated in the program brushes for Peace in Medellín, Colombia 2003, The order of Merit Don Juan del Corral Golden Degree awarded by the City Council of the City of Medellín 2010.

The Order of Merit Antonio Nariño of Ciprec, Medellín, Colombia 2010. The Order of Merit Civic and Business Marshal Jorge Robledo, silver degree granted by the Departmental Assembly of Antioquia 2011. He has exhibited at the National and International level.

In 2009 he painted a portrait commemorating the birth of General Rafael Uribe Uribe inspired by Aureliano Buendía character invented by Gabriel García Márquez. The work was delivered to the President of the Republic of Colombia Álvaro Uribe.

The Antioqueño works of this painter address several trends and expressions that characterize it as the realism, expressionism and abstract. With a strong predisposition to color and grays product of its dualism between his native tropics and their settlement in the Andean city of Medellín

In the work of José Javier Mejía dominated the expressionist figures and abstractions laden fantasies product of his diary wit. In the search in which the artist is committed, we can see the newest ways that break established patterns and demands, as a way of perfection, has established culture. But not for this, his work is far from the chaos and, rather, is the foundation anchored in a solid classical school where we can show the balance of masses and colors.

José Javier Mejia as an artist Art of color and forms has enabled Antioquia vibrate with its initiative to touch the heart and think of a time when the endless possibilities of art as a liberating dreams, life of peace and thus contributes to the building a better future. will form a new culture of coexistence in Colombia is a dream we all cherish.

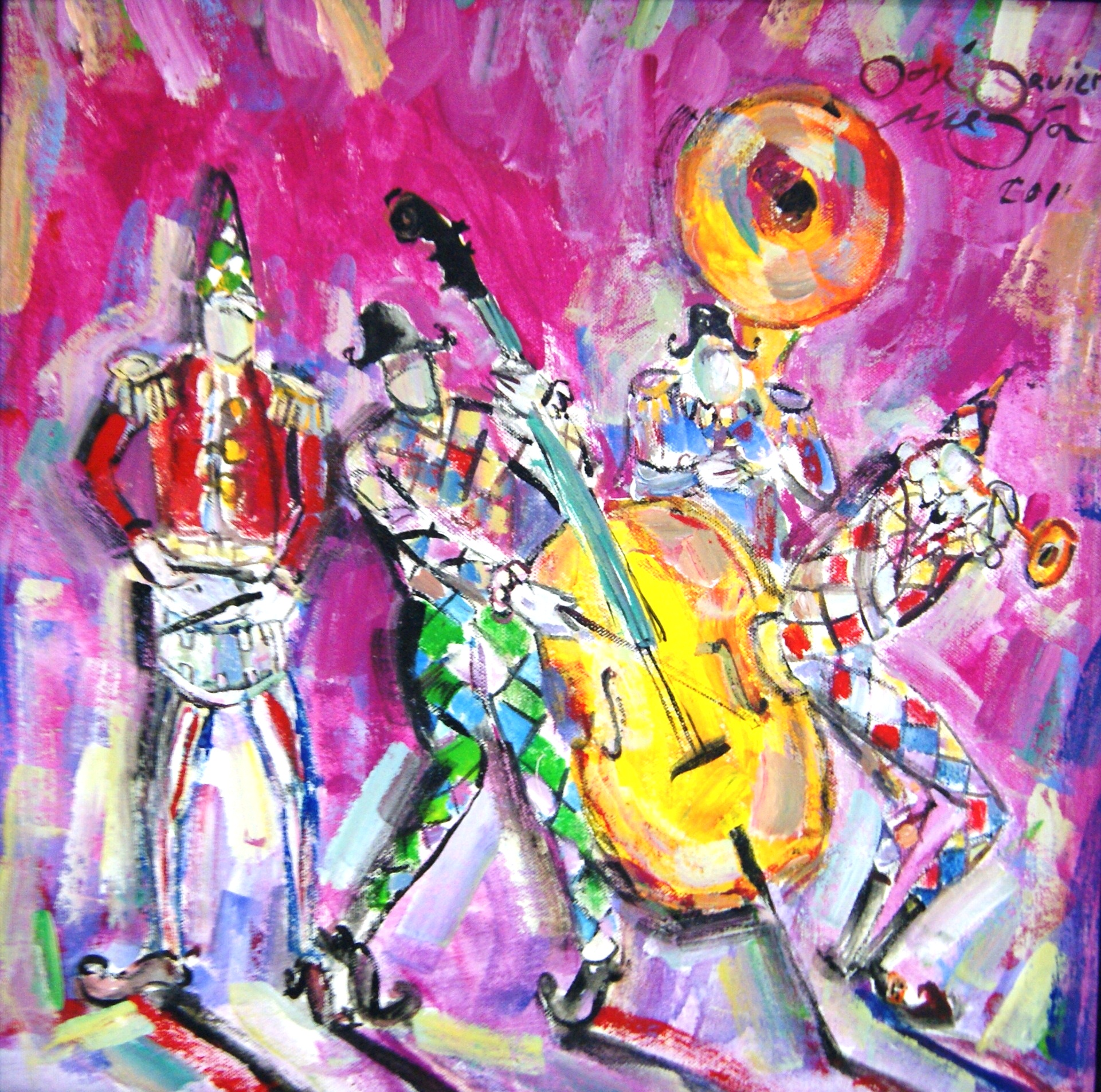
Músicos saltimbanqui

== Life and career ==
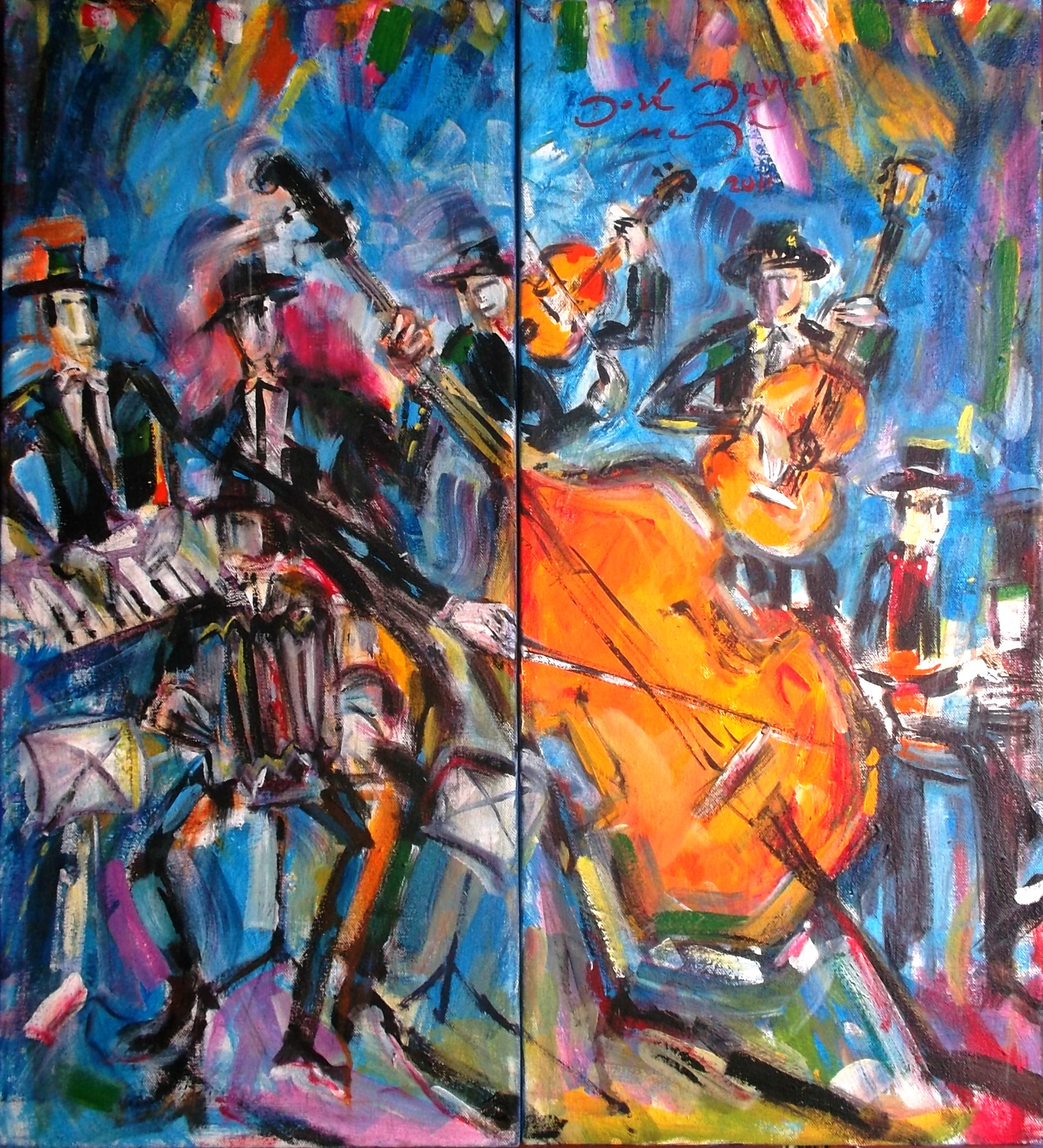
Músicos de tango

José Javier Mejía Palacio was born on May 2, 1964 in Barranquilla. He is the son of son of Rita Cecilia Palacio Camargo and Francisco Javier Mejía Restrepo.

At age 16 he began studying Painting in Institute of Fine Arts in Medellin Palacio de Bellas Artes de Medellín, graduating in 1985 as a Master of Plastic Arts. Studied Oil, Pastel and Bernini Sculpture Workshop in Medellín, 1985. Oil Workshop with Artist María Victoria Velez. Since childhood his first teacher Santiago Rabat Spanish painter living in Colombia gave his brushes, teacher Rabat was brother of his grandmother Carolina Restrepo Mejía. Among his family highlights several artists as: 'Marco Tobon Mejia' (Antioqueño sculptor), Epifanio Mejía Quijano '(Antioqueño Poet, writer of the letter Himno de Antioquia (or Antioqueño Anthem)).

Mejía has been a teacher in the University ITM of Medellín and Teacher of the school Eladio Vélez en Itagui.

== Distinctions ==
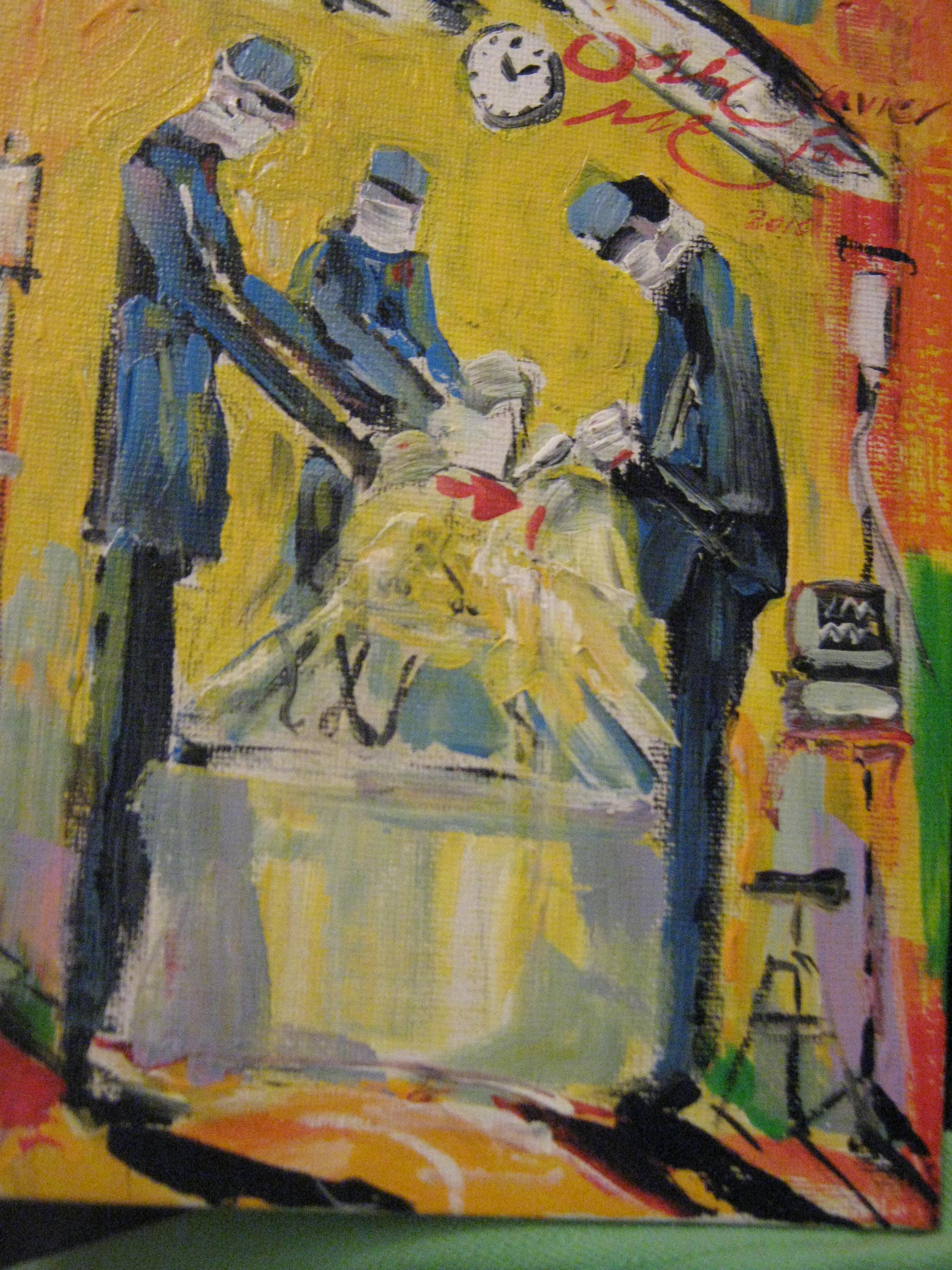
Surgeons

- 2003 Medal for Peace, Fenalco Antioquia. In recognition of the social work with children who participated in the program Brushes for Peace. Medellín, Colombia.
- 2008 Merit Award: "Al Smith Culture" Bello CIPREC Mayor and Corporation Department Of Arts Network. Medellín October 30, 2008.
- 2010 Recognition Indeportes Antioquia in the framework of the IX 2010 South American Games.
- 2010 Order of Merit Juan del Corral Grade Gold Council of Medellín November 17, 2010.
- 2010 Order of Merit Antonio Nariño of Ciprec, Medellín, Colombia.
- 2011 Civic and Business Order of Merit Marshal Jorge Robledo, grade silver, Departmental Assembly of Antioquia

== Exhibitions ==
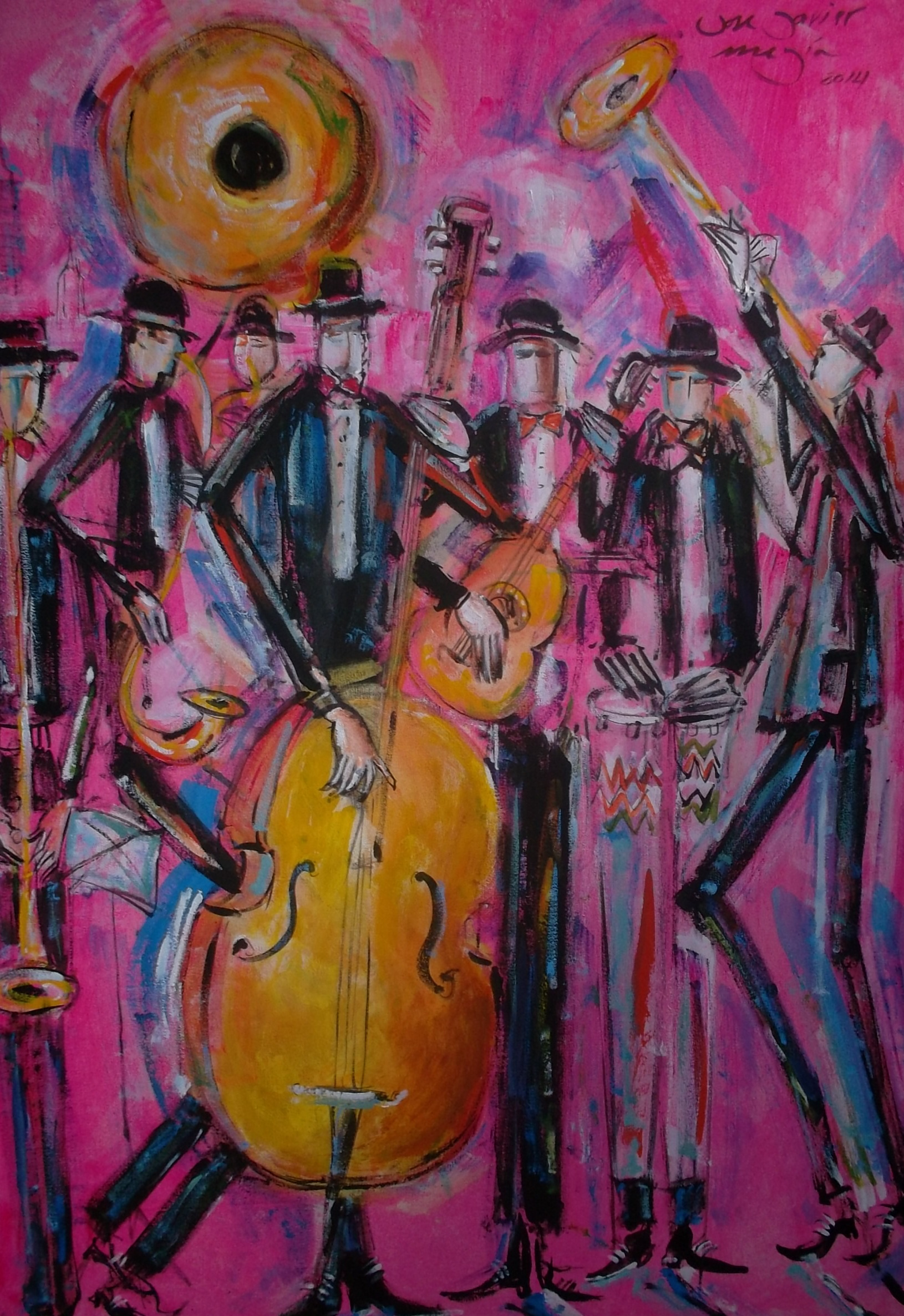
Músicos de Jazz Latino

- 1992 Painting. Galería Billar. La Ceja. Antioquia. Colombia.
- 1997 Painting. Alcaldía de Medellín. Medellín. Colombia.
- 1997 Painting. Club Campestre. Medellín. Colombia.
- 1999 Painting. Exposición Privada. Medellín. Colombia
- 2000 Painting. Alcaldía de Medellín, “Soñador de Formas”. Salón Guillermo Cano. Medellín.Colombia.
- 2000 Painting. Concejo de Medellín. “Sueños y Realidades”. Medellín. Colombia
- 2002 Painting. Comfama de San Ignacio. Medellín. Colombia.
- 2004 Painting. Restaurante Ave María. Medellín. Colombia.
- 2005 Painting. Galería Diego Victoria. Miami. Estados Unidos.
- 2007 Painting. Hotel Portón Medellín. “La Pasión Taurina” Medellín. Colombia.
- 2011 Exhibition “Expresiones y Abstracciones”, Asamblea Departamental de Antioquia, Medellín, Colombia.
- 2012 Painting Exhibition. Triadarte Universidad Pontificia Bolivariana Medellín. Medellín. Colombia

== Group exhibitions ==
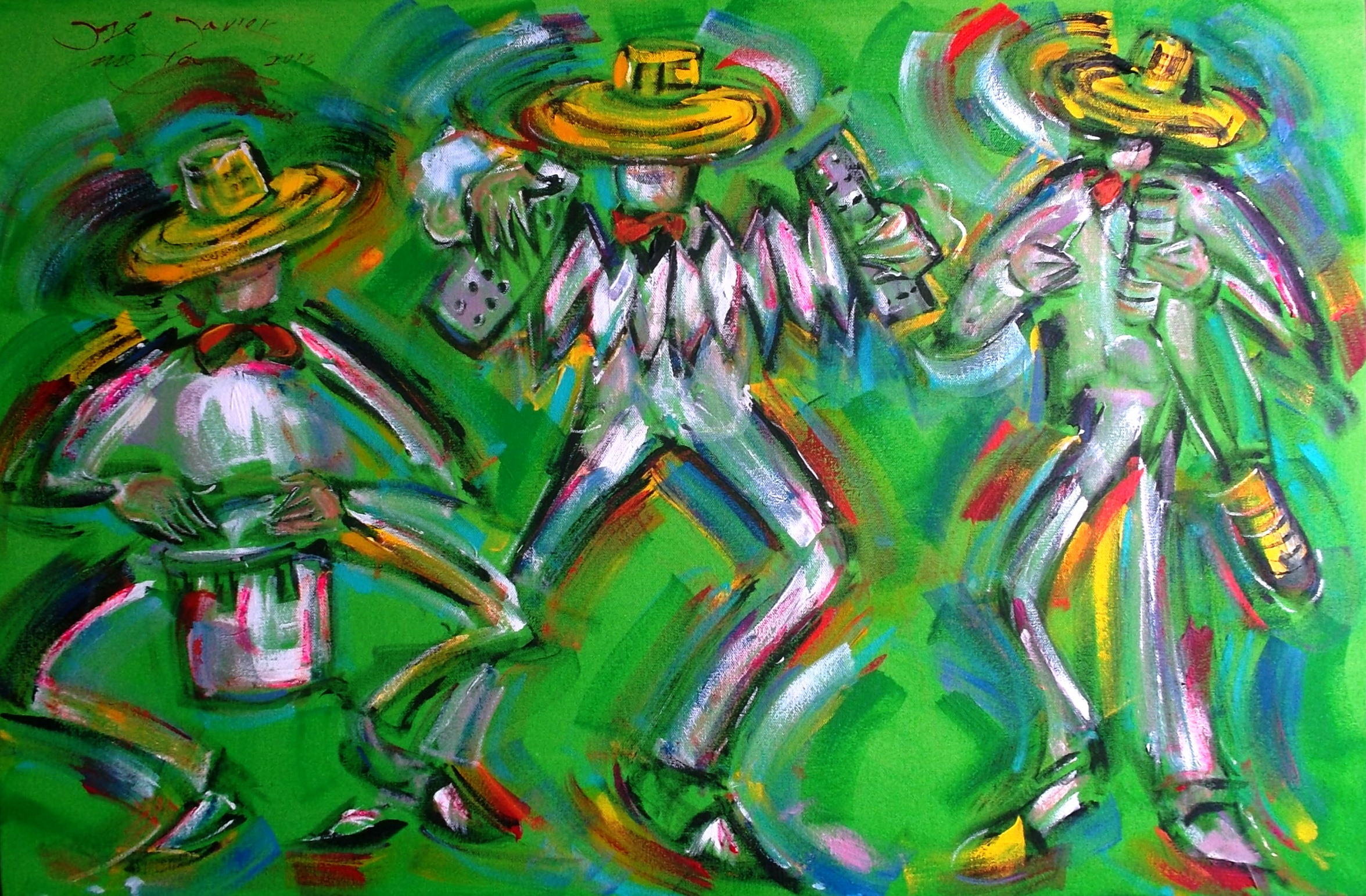
Músicos de Vallenatos

- 1983 Painting. Exposición de Talleres Instituto de Bellas Artes. Medellín. Colombia
- 1984 Painting. Exposición Colectiva con el Consulado de Venezuela. Liceo Superior de Medellín. Colombia.
- 1990 Painting. Galería La Francia. Medellín. Colombia
- 1990 Painting. Todo en Artes. Medellín. Colombia.
- 1992 Painting. I Expoarte Vial. Bello. Antioquia. Colombia
- 1992 Painting. Exposición artistas Jaime Guevara, Carlos Duque y José Javier Mejía. Galería Torremolinos. Envigado. Colombia
- 1993 Painting. I Salón de Artistas Yarumaleños. Cámara de Comercio de Medellín. Medellín. Colombia
- 1993 Painting. “Doce Formas”. Biblioteca Pública Marco Fidel Suárez. Bello. Antioquia. Colombia
- 1993 Painting. II Muestra Annual de Arte Contemporáneo. Pequeño Formato. Galería Estudio Lucy Correa. Medellín. Colombia
- 1993 Painting. VII Salón de Octubre. Concejo de Yarumal. Antioquia. Colombia
- 1993 Painting. Fundación Universitaria del Norte. Yarumal. Antioquia. Colombia
- 1994 Painting. III Muestra Annual de Arte Contemporáneo. Pequeño Formato. Galería El Estudio. Medellín. Colombia
- 1994 Painting. “Veintidós Artistas de la misma Generación”. Casa de La Cultura La Barquereña. Sabaneta. Antioquia. Colombia
- 1995 Painting. Lanzamiento del Libro: “Forma y Color Colombia, 1995”. Bogotá. Colombia
- 1995 Painting. Lanzamiento del Libro: “Forma y Color Colombia”. Galería El Estudio. Medellín. Colombia
- 1995 Painting. “Quince Artistas en Oriente”. Galería Billar. La Ceja. Antioquia. Colombia
- 1995 Painting. IV Muestra Annual “Cincuenta Artistas en Pequeño Formato”. Galería El Estudio. Medellín. Colombia
- 1996 Painting. “Maestros y Contemporáneos”. Cooperativa de Trabajadores de Empresas Públicas de Medellín. Medellín. Colombia
- 1996 Painting. “Contemporáneos en Antioquia”. Galería Salón 33”. Medellín. Colombia
- 1996 Painting. “Artistas Yarumaleños”. Cámara de Comercio de Medellín. Medellín. Colombia
- 1996 Painting. Inauguración de La Galería Isarte. Medellín. Colombia
- 1997 Painting. “Realistas 2000”. Hotel La Fontana. Bogotá. Colombia
- 1997 Painting. “Temas Taurinos”. Galería Isarte. Medellín Colombia.
- 1997 Painting. “Temas Religiosos”. Galería Isarte. Medellín. Colombia
- 1997 Painting. “Pintura y Escultura” Galería Kendrick's. Medellín. Colombia
- 1997 Painting. Universidad Autónoma. Barranquilla. Colombia
- 1997 Painting. “Homenaje a Van Gogh”. Hotel Dann.Medellín. Colombia
- 1997 Painting. Contraloría General de Antioquia. Medellín. Colombia
- 1998 Painting. Alcaldía de Jardín. Antioquia. Colombia
- 1999 Painting. “Itagüí también es Arte”. Alcaldía de Itagüí. Antioquia. Colombia.
- 1999 Painting. I Muestra de Arte Religioso. Hostal San Diego. Cartagena. Colombia
- 2000 Painting. Inauguración de La Galería Atellier D´ Arte. Medellín. Colombia
- 2000 Painting. Club Campestre. Medellín. Colombia
- 2001 Painting. Exposición de grandes maestros antioqueños, Liceo Nocturno Raúl Guevara Castaño. Itagui, Antioquia
- 2001 Painting de luz y color, Galería taller de Ara, Medellín, Colombia
- 2002 Painting colectiva de pintores y escultores, Hall de la alcaldía de Medellín, Colombia.
- 2003 Painting colectiva “Cinco Identidades” Hotel Mercury. Medellín, Colombia.
- 2003 Painting Colectiva. “Esplendor de Formas”. Hall de la Alcaldía de Medellín.
- 2004 Painting Colectiva Institución Educativa Santa Rosa de Lima. Medellín.
- 2005 Painting Casa de Convenciones Gualanday Llano Grande. Antioquia.
- 2005 Painting 15.ª muestra colectiva de artistas antioqueños asamblea Departamental de Antioquia. Medellín, Colombia
- 2005 Painting 17.ª Muestra Colectiva de Arte regional Antioqueño, Asamblea Departamental de Antioquia, Medellín, Antioquia.
- 2006 Painting Muestra Colectiva de Artistas Asociados, Corporación Red Departamental de Artes, Casa de La Cultura “La Barquereña”.
- 2006 Painting “Salón Artistas Asociados”, Corporación Universitaria Lasallista, Caldas, Antioquia.
- 2006 Painting, Artistas Asociados, Corporación Red Departamental de Arte Galería de Arte, Palacio de la Cultura “Rafael Uribe Uribe”.
- 2006 Painting. Galería Cerro Nutibara “Talleres de Artes Plásticas y Visuales de Medellín”. Medellín. Colombia.
- 2006 Elite Art Gallery, Exhibition Collective. Miami, Florida.
- 2006 Salome Fine Art Gallery, “News Horizonts” Wynewood District de Miami, Florida. USA
- 2007 Painting. Fundación Universitaria San Martín “Arte en Honor a la Mujer” Medellín.Colombia.
- 2007 Painting Galería Cerro Nutibara “Al Salón de Arte Festival de Tango” Medellín. Colombia.
- 2008 Painting. Galería Raúl Toro “Segunda Exposición Pequeño Formato” Medellín.Colombia.
- 2008 Painting. Aeropuerto José María Córdoba. “Artistas Asociados, Corporación Red Departamental de Artes, Medellín. Colombia.
- 2009 Painting. Casa de Cultura la Barquerena. “Vuelo de Cometas” Sabaneta, Antioquia, Colombia.
- 2009 Painting. Biblioteca de Envigado. “Vuelo de Cometas” Sabaneta, Antioquia, Colombia.
- 2010 Painting. 12 destacados artistas de la plástica. Concejo de Medellín, Colombia.
- 2010 Painting. Homenaje al Bicentenario de Colombia. Facultad de Minas en la Universidad Nacional y en el ITM.
- 2011 Painting. “Tauromaquia”, Centro Comercial Terminal del Sur. Medellín, Colombia
- 2011 Exposición de tangos, galería cerro Nutibara, Medellín, Colombia
- 2011 Exhibitions al aire libre Paseo Junín, Museo en la Calle, Medellín Colombia.
- 2011 Exhibitions de pintura Otras miradas al Quijote. Galería vino al arte. El Carmen de Viboral, Antioquia, Colombia.
- 2011 Exhibitions de Tangos, Galería Arte Julio y Francisco de Caro en La Academia del Tango en Buenos Aires Argentina.
- 2011 Exhibitions de Tango Festival Internacional “Viva el Tango” Montevideo Uruguay.
- 2011 Exhibitions 12 artistas concejo de Medellín. Medellín, Colombia
- 2012 Exhibitions Primer Festival Metropolitano de Arte Religioso Caldas Antioquia, Colombia.
- 2012 Exhibitions El arte se toma al ITM. Medellín, Colombia.
- 2012 Exhibitions en homenaje a las Madres, Casa Taller de Caldas, Antioquia.
- 2012 Exhibitions pequeño formato Galeria Talcual Medellín
- 2012 Exhibitions Triarte, sala de Exposición. Universidad Pontificia Bolivariana, Medellín, Colombia.
- 2012 Exhibitions pintando al aire libre. Universidad Pontificia Bolivariana Medellín Colombia.
- 2012 Exhibitions Colectiva Colegio La Enseñanza. Medellín, Colombia
- 2014 Exhibitions Colectiva Consulado Colombiano en Bélgica. Bruselas, Bélgica.
- 2014 Exhibitions Jaque al arte 2, Galería Roberto Jairo Arango, Casa de la Cultura La Barquereña. Sabaneta, Antioquia
- 2014 Exhibitions Festival del Tango. Aeropuerto Olaya Herrera. Medellín. Colombia.
- 2015 Exhibitions El Tango se toma Envigado. Casa de la Cultura Miguel Uribe Restrepo. Envigado. Colombia.
- 2015 Exposición Colectiva Manifestación Artística II Casa Antigua Sede Emisora Latina Estéreo. Envigado, Colombia
- 2016 Exposición Colectiva Muestra Artística de Alumnos Establecimiento COPED EC. San Cristóbal, Medellín, Colombia
- 2016 Exposición Colectiva CACOM 5. Rionegro, Colombia
- 2017 Exposición Colectiva Colombia en Paz, Consulado de Colombia en Bruselas, Bélgica.

== Auctions ==
- 1991 Pro Pequeño Teatro. Medellín. Colombia
- 1991 Pro Fundación Estación Ferrocarril de Antioquia. Medellín. Colombia
- 1991 Pro Acción Social Cuarta Brigada. Medellín. Colombia
- 1991 Gallery Rubens. Medellín. Colombia
- 1992 Gallery Lizcano. Medellín.Colombia
- 1992 500 Años del Descubrimiento de América.Bogotá. Colombia
- 1992 Pro Departamento de Tránsito. Bello. Antioquia
- 1996 Pro Hogares Juveniles. Medellín. Colombia

== Invitations ==
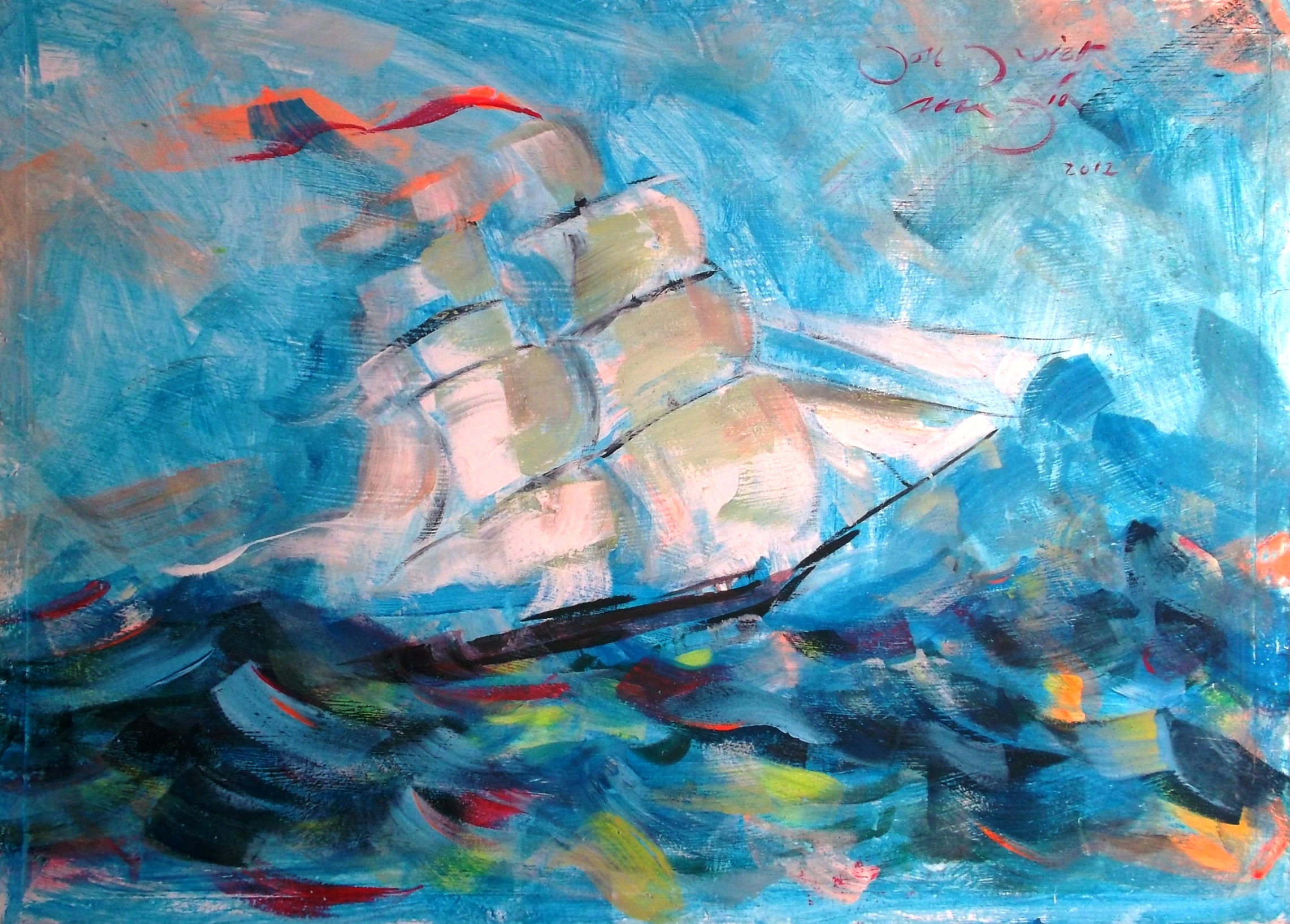
Barco

- 1996 “ARTEXPO 96” Feria Internacional de Arte de Barcelona del 1 al 5 de mayo. Barcelona.España
- 1996 Exposición en La Galería Rotini del 9 al 24 de agosto. Livorno. Italia
- 1996 Catalogo Especial para “La Feria Internacional de Basilea. Basel Art 96 de Junio 12 al 17. Basilea. Suiza
- 1996 Herencia Hispana en América. Exposición Oficial del XXIV Festival de la Hispanidad de Miami del mes de octubre. Miami.FL, USA
- 1996 Exposición de Arte en New York City. Batik Graphic “96” Julio 11 al 31 Carib Art Gallery. Soho. New York. USA
- 1997 “Feria Internacional del Libro de Frankfurt” Feria Internacional de Arte sobre papel. Octubre 15 al 20. Frankfurt. Alemania.
- 1998 Feria Internacional de Arte en New York. Septiembre 9 al 31. New York. USA
- 1999 “Expresiones Latinas” en San Francisco. Mes de agosto. San Francisco. USA
- 1999 Feria Internacional de Arte en New York. Septiembre 9 al 13. New York. USA
- 2000 Exposición por Invitación a Artistas Contemporáneos Latinoamericanos No 2 en Broward Community College de Pembroke Pines. Florida. USA

== Bibliography ==
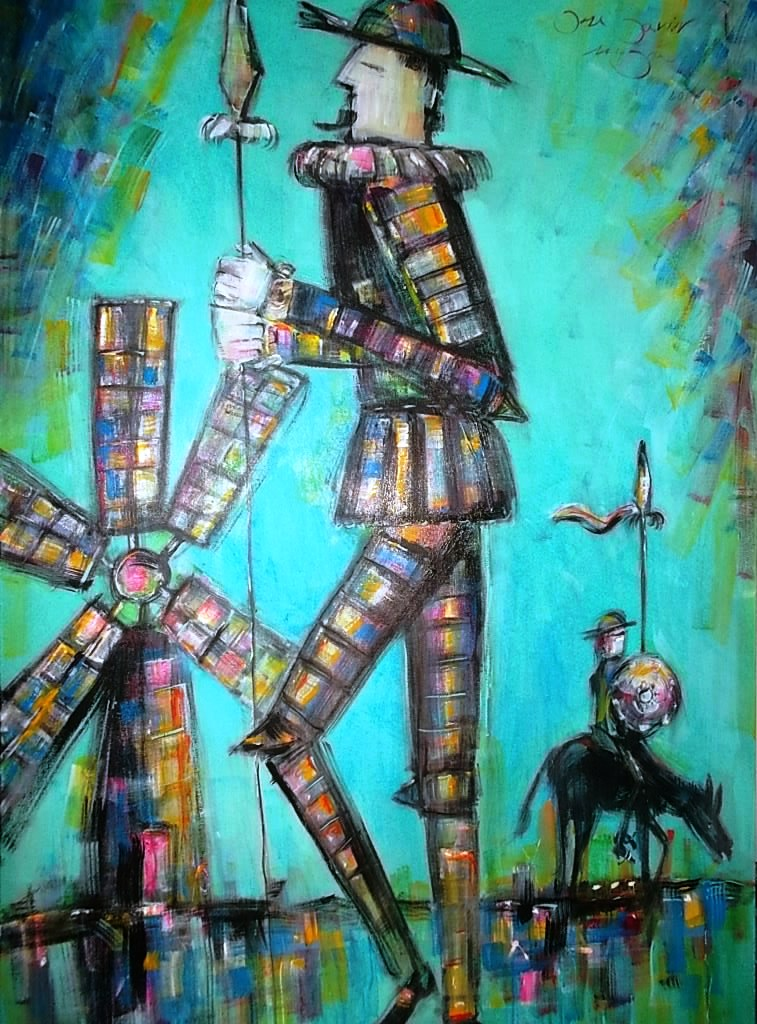
El Quijote

- 1985 2 Internal Murals and one external in the Liceo Superior de Medellín.
- 1992 Artistic mural in the bar galería El Guanábano.
- 1992 Newspaper El Colombiano. “Prográmese Hoy”. Página Cultural, Octubre 16 Medellín, Colombia.
- 1992 Newspaper El Mundo. “¡Vaya que Vallas!” Sección Vida” Diciembre 9. Medellín. Colombia.
- 1992 Newspaper El Colombiano. “Arte para Contemplar en Carretera”. Página Cultural/Especiales. Diciembre 20. Medellín, Colombia.
- 1993 Catalog Exposición “Doce Formas”. Biblioteca Pública Marco Fidel Suárez. Abril 23. Bello. Antioquia. Colombia.
- 1993 Catalog Exposición. “I Salón de Artistas Yarumaleños”. Cámara de Comercio de Medellín. Mayo 5. Medellín, Colombia.
- 1994 Poster. “Compartiendo el Desafío en Concierto”. Alcaldía de Medellín y las Naciones Unidas. Medellín, Colombia.
- 1994 Newspaper El Colombiano. “Veintidós Artistas de una misma Generación”. Página Cultural. Mayo 12. Medellín, Colombia.
- 1995 Newspaper El Colombiano. “El Arte entre Ceja y Ceja”. Panorama Cultural. Octubre 13. Medellín, Colombia.
- 1995 Book Forma y Color Colombia. XI Edición. Bogotá, Colombia.
- 1995 Newspaper el Colombiano. ”El Arte sé Riega por Antioquia”.Página Cultural. Octubre 19. Medellín, Colombia.
- 1996 Book of poetry: “Donde Germina El Trigo en El Oscuro”. Author: Conny Rojas Sanin. Edición: Secretaría de Educación. Edición Ilustrada con Pinturas de Artistas Antioqueños. Una Ilustración Interior con Obra de José Javier Mejía. Medellín, Colombia.
- 1997 Catalog Exhibitions. “Artistas Yarumaleños”. Cámara de Comercio de Medellín. Centro de Servicios El Poblado. Agosto 21. Medellín. Colombia.
- 1997 Newspaper El Colombiano. “De Visita por Las Galerías”. Página Cultural Abril 1. Medellín Colombia.
- 1997 Newspaper El Mundo. ”Oleos y Acuarelas”. Sección Vida! Abril 2. Medellín. Colombia.
- 1997 Newspaper El Colombiano. “A la Alcaldía por el Arte”. Página Social. Abril 5. Medellín. Colombia.
- 1997 Catalog Individual Individual. Alcaldía de Medellín. Del 1 al 15 de abril. Medellín. Colombia.
- 1997 TV Show. Teleantioquia. Enlace. Medellín. Colombia.
- 1997 Newspaper El Colombiano. “Las Madonas De Mejía”. Página Cultural y Sociedad. Mayo 14. Medellín. Colombia.
- 1997 Newspaper El Colombiano. “Cultura para Todos”. Página Cultural. Mayo 9. Medellín. Colombia.
- 1997 Newspaper El Colombiano. “Los Doce de Kendrick¨s”. Página Cultural. Julio 3. Medellín. Colombia.
- 1997 Newspaper El Colombiano. “Ronda por Las Galerías”. Página Cultural. Octubre 7. Medellín. Colombia.
- 1997 TV Show. Teleantioquia. “Aquí esta Lo Bueno”. Medellín. Colombia.
- 1997 Book: “Medellín...en equipo con el Arte”. Editor Alcaldía de Medellín. Medellín. Colombia.
- 1998 Newspaper El Colombiano: “Feria de Arte en Jardín”. Página Cultural y Sociedad. Agosto 14. Medellín. Colombia.
- 1998 Catalog Group Exhibition. “Sabaneta Participamos Todos”. Casa de La Cultura La Barquereña. Octubre 1 al 20. Sabaneta. Antioquia. Colombia.
- 1999 Newspaper El Colombiano. “Pinturas de José Javier Mejía”. Página Cultura. Octubre 12. Medellín. Colombia.
- 1999 TV Show. Teleantioquia. “Aquí esta Lo Bueno”. José Javier Mejía El Mejor Retratista de Colombia”. Octubre. Medellín. Colombia.
- 1999 TV Show. Tele Antioquia. “De Norte A Sur”
- 2000 Catalog Exposición Individual. Alcaldía de Medellín. Septiembre 19. Medellín. Colombia.
- 2000 Newspaper El Colombiano. “Las Pinturas de José Javier Mejía” por Oscar Henao Mejía. Literario Dominical. Septiembre 24. Medellín. Colombia. (Internet El Colombiano, Sección Literario Dominical y La Ciudad Terra.com).
- 2000 Newspaper El Mundo. “El Universo de las Apariencias”. Sección Vida”. Octubre 9. Medellín. Colombia. (Internet en la sección Vida!).
- 2000 Poster Individual Exhibition.“Sueños y Realidades”. Concejo de Medellín del 23 de noviembre al 20 de diciembre. Medellín. Colombia.
- 2000 Newspaper El Colombiano. Notas Culturales. Página Cultura. Noviembre 23. Medellín. Colombia.
- 2000 TV Show. Teleantioquia. Visión. Ciudad. Alcaldía de Medellín. Medellín. Colombia.
- 2001 TV Show. Telemedellín, Cultura Viva. Una Entrevista Duración Una Hora Medellín, Colombia.
- 2002 TV Show. Telemedellín, AM, Amanece Medellín. Medellín, Colombia.
- 2003 TV Show. Televida, Al calor del fuego. Medellín, Colombia.
- 2004 TV Show. Teleantioquia, Enlace. Medellín, Colombia.
- 2004 TV Show. Telemedellín, Al Medio Día. Medellín, Colombia.
- 2004 TV Show. Telecaribe, Barranquilla, Colombia.
- 2004 TV Show. Paisa Visión, pintando un mural en vivo Medellín, Colombia.
- 2005 Newspaper Gente del Poblado, un artista que se abre puertas en la Internet Medellín, Colombia.
- 2005 TV Show Televida, red de amigos Medellín, Colombia.
- 2005 Newspaper El Colombiano Vida y Cultura. Reportaje: “Las Presencias Imaginarias marcan obra de José Mejía”. Agosto 29 de 2005 Medellín, Colombia.
- 2007 Newspaper El Colombiano “Toros Mansos en Oleo, Bronce y Cartón, Piedra”. Febrero 8 de 2007 Medellín, Colombia. Periódico El Colombiano. Vida y Cultura “La Pasión Taurina de José Javier Mejía” Febrero 8 de 2007. Medellín. Colombia.
- 2007 Newspaper El Mundo. La Metro “Artistas Al Ruedo” Febrero 6 de 2007. Medellín. Colombia.
- 2007 Interview in the program “Una visita guiada” del canal Telemedellín, exposición taurina
- 2007 TV Show “Buena Vida”, del canal Cosmovisión entrevista.
- 2008 Newspaper El Colombiano. Zona Urbana. Reportaje ”Pintor de las Monalisas de Medellín” Mayo 23 de 2008. Medellín, Colombia
- 2008 Newspaper El Colombiano. Generación. “Pensagrama” Junio 1 de 2008.Medellín.Colombia.
- 2009 Newspaper El Colombiano. Vida. Crónica “Un Pincel Evoca La Cueva” Julio 17 de 2009. Medellín, Colombia.
- 2009 Newspaper El Colombiano. Vida. “270 Ventanas para ver 120 Mundos” Agosto 10 de 2009. Medellín. Colombia.
- 2009 -2010 Trabajo en Vivo La Caravana del arte en Movimiento.
- 2010 Newspaper El Colombiano. Tips. A los mineros ya los eternizó una obra de arte. 19 de junio de 2010
- 2011 News Teleantioquia, Medellín, Colombia.
- 2011 TV Show “Actos y decisiones” Teleantioquia, Medellín, Colombia.
- 2011 Newspaper El Colombiano. Vida. Noticia “El Tango También suena al Ritmo de la Pintura” Junio 24 de 2011
- 2011 Newspaper El Colombiano. Opinión, Por Oscar Henao Mejía “Los Músicos de José Javier Mejía”. 4 de noviembre de 2011.
- 2012 Newspaper Gente Envigado. Tendencias/Lugares, “El Arte de los Mejía les da color a muros del Escobero”. Febrero 24 de 2012, Envigado, Colombia.
- 2012 Magazine "Generación", El Colombiano, Sección Artes Plásticas “Experimentos Compartidos”, Domingo 10 de junio de 2012.
- 2012 Un homenaje a Mariana Pajón, El Colombiano, sección Deportes 14 de agosto de 2012, “Homenaje Artístico, José Javier también la pintó”
- 2013 Interview con el maestro José Javier Mejía Palacio en el Programa Contraseña del ITM. Canal Telemedellin.
- 2015 Newspaper Gente Envigado. Gente Cercana pagina 21, "La pintura es un deleite y una catarsis". Agosto 28 de 2015. Envigado Colombia.
- 2017 Interview realizada en el Programa Camino al Barrio en Teleantioquia y Telemedellín.
- 2017 Newspaper Gente Belén. Gente Cercana página 16, "José Javier ayuda a pintar alas de libertad".Junio 23 de 2017. Belén Colombia.
