= Mònica Miquel Serdà =

Spanish politician (1962–2023)

Member of the Congress of Deputies
- In office 9 December 2003 – 2 April 2004
- Preceded by: Joan Saura
- Constituency: Barcelona

Personal details
- Born: Mònica Miquel i Serdà; 18 November 1962 Barcelona, Spain
- Died: 24 January 2023 (aged 60) Cubelles, Spain
- Party: ICV

Mònica Miquel i Serdà (18 November 1962 – 24 January 2023) was a Spanish politician. A member of the Initiative for Catalonia Greens, she served in the Congress of Deputies from 2003 to 2004.

Miquel died in Cubelles on 24 January 2023, at the age of 60.
