= Màrius Díaz =

Spanish politician (1933–2023)

Màrius Díaz Bielsa (6 August 1933 – 27 May 2023) was a Spanish politician who was a member of the Unified Socialist Party of Catalonia (PSUC). He was the first mayor of Badalona elected after the 1979 Spanish local elections, during the Spanish transition to democracy.

== Career ==
Born in Barbastro (Huesca, Aragon) in 1933, he lived in Badalona, where he worked as a company manager and entered the Unified Socialist Party of Catalonia. He was elected as city councillor and mayor of Badalona in 1979. He served in office from 1979 to 1983, in coalition with the Socialists’ Party of Catalonia (PSC), with a government formed with communists and independent Catholic-oriented politicians too.

During his mandate, the names of the streets of Badalona were changed from Spanish to Catalan. He intended to open a provisional local television, but was sealed by a court order, and the police arrested the mayor and other members of the local government who were protesting closed inside the provisional television building. A few hours later, they were set free.

Díaz lost the next election in 1983 because of the division created between eurocommunists and pro-Soviet factions of his party. After PSUC was merged with other parties in Initiative for Catalonia Greens, Díaz attended with them to elections until 1995. He also served in the Parliament of Catalonia between 1984 and 1988.

== Personal life ==
Díaz was married to Teresa Lleal Galceran, a teacher, who died in 1988. He died on 27 May 2023, at the age of 89.
