= Juanjo Ferreiro Suárez =

Spanish trade unionist (1944–2023)

Member of the City Council of Barcelona
- In office 25 May 1983 – 27 May 1995

Member of the Parliament of Catalonia
- In office 10 April 1980 – 20 March 1984

Personal details
- Born: 1 April 1944 Lugo, Galicia, Spain
- Died: 6 April 2023 (aged 79) Barcelona
- Party: Socialists' Party of Catalonia

Juanjo José Ferreiro Suárez (1 April 1944 – 6 April 2023) was a Spanish Catalan trade unionist, politician, and prominent labor leader against the Franco dictatorship. Following the Spanish transition to democracy, Ferreiro co-founded the Socialists' Party of Catalonia (PSC) in 1976 and was elected to the first legislature of the Parliament of Catalonia from 1980 to 1984. He then served in the City Council of Barcelona, representing Nou Barris, from his election in 1983 to 1995. In 2005, Ferreiro was awarded the Medal of Honor of Barcelona for his contributions to the city's working-class Nou Barris district.

Ferreiro was born in Lugo, Galicia, on 1 April 1944. He moved to Barcelona in 1964, where he worked as an automobile painter and joined the Workers' Commissions, then a clandestine labor organization, in 1966. He was arrested three times by the Franco regime and fired from several jobs for his support of labor and trade unions.

He resided in the municipality of Campins, just outside Barcelona, during his later life. Ferreiro died on 6 April 2023, at the age of 79.
