= José Javier Cortez =

Ecuadorian footballer (born 1995)

José Cortez
Personal information
- Full name: José Javier Cortez Arroyo
- Date of birth: 5 May 1995 (age 31)
- Place of birth: Esmeraldas, Ecuador
- Height: 1.89 m (6 ft 2 in)
- Position: Forward

Team information
- Current team: Zacatepec
- Number: 31

Youth career
- 2011–2013: Deportivo Coca

Senior career*
Years	Team	Apps	(Gls)
2013	Quevedo	12	(2)
2014–2017	América de Quito		
2014	→ Quito (loan)	17	(3)
2015	→ Loja (loan)	21	(3)
2016	→ Clan Juvenil (loan)		
2017–2018	Delfín	0	(0)
2018	Galácticos		
2019–	Zacatepec	9	(1)

International career^{‡}
2014	Ecuador U20	1	(0)
- * Club domestic league appearances and goals as of 18:44, 16 April 2019 (UTC) ‡ National team caps and goals as of 18:44, 16 April 2019 (UTC)

José Javier Cortez Arroyo (born 5 May 1995) is an Ecuadorian footballer who currently plays as a forward for Zacatepec.

== Career statistics ==
=== Club ===
As of 16 April 2019.

Club	Season	League			Cup		Continental		Other		Total	
Club	Season	Division	Apps	Goals	Apps	Goals	Apps	Goals	Apps	Goals	Apps	Goals
Quevedo	2013	Ecuadorian Serie A	12	2	0	0	–		0	0	12	2
Quito (loan)	2014	Ecuadorian Serie A	17	3	0	0	–		0	0	12	2
Loja (loan)	2015	Ecuadorian Serie A	21	3	0	0	1 (Note: Appearances in the Copa Sudamericana)	0	0	0	22	3
Zacatepec	2018–19	Liga MX	9	1	4 (Note: Appearances in the Copa MX)	0	–		0	0	13	1
Career total			59	9	4	0	1	0	0	0	64	9
