= Salvador García-Bodaño =

Spanish poet (1935–2023)

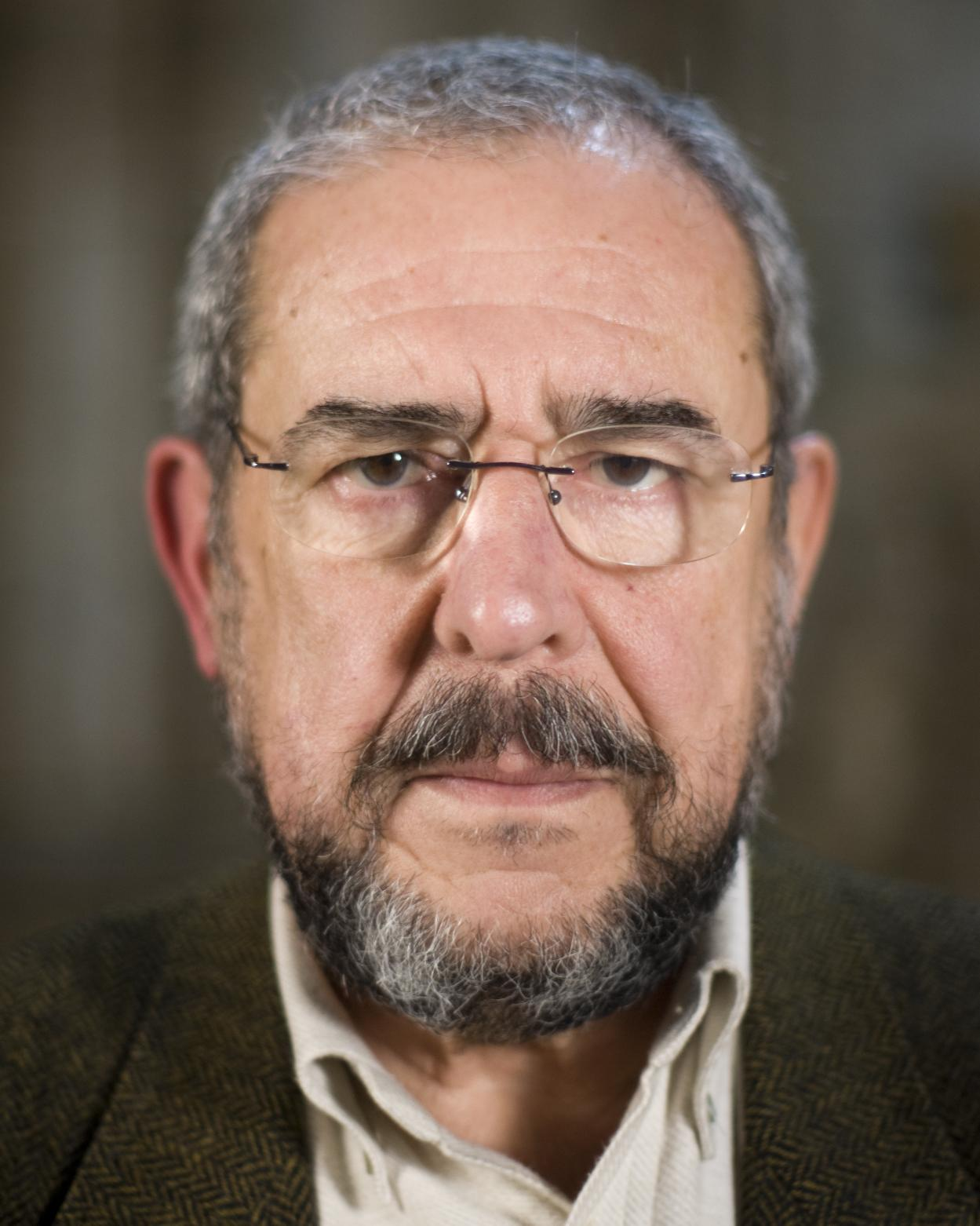
- Born: Salvador García-Bodaño Zunzunegui; July 17, 1935; Teis, Vigo, Spanish Republic
- Died: March 7, 2023 (aged 87); Santiago de Compostela, Spain
- Occupations: Writer, poet

Signature
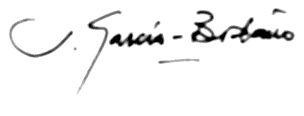

Salvador García-Bodaño (17 July 1935 – 7 March 2023) was a Spanish poet. He was a member of the Royal Galician Academy from 1992 until his death.

== Awards and honors ==
- Premio de Poesía Gallega y Poesía Castellana en las Festas Minervais (1959)
- Premio de la Crítica de poesía gallega por Tempo de Compostela (1978)
- Premio de la Junta de Galicia a la Creación Cultural (1988)
- Premio de la Crítica de narrativa gallega por Os misterios de Monsieur D´Aillier (1992)
- Premio O Escritor na súa Terra de AELG (2004)
- Premio Cultura Galega das Letras (2012)
- Insignia de Ouro de la Universidad de Santiago de Compostela (2012)
- Premio Voz da Liberdade de PEN Clube de Galicia (2013)
- Medalla de ouro e título de Fillo adoptivo de Santiago de Compostela (2014). Además, la municipalidad de Santiago le dedicó una plaza en el barrio de San Lázaro.
