= Concha García Zaera =

Spanish internet artist (1930–2023)

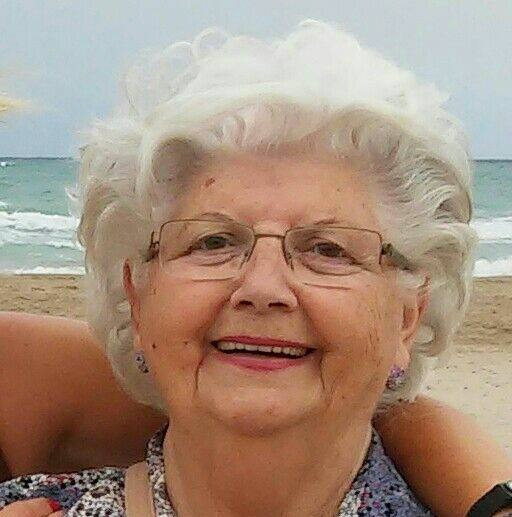
- Born: 12 June 1930; Valencia, Spain
- Died: 20 July 2023 (aged 93)
- Other name: La abuela del Paint
- Occupation: Digital artist
- Children: Several, including daughter Mar

Concha García Zaera (12 June 1930 – 20 July 2023) was a Spanish digital artist. In her later years, she became known for her Instagram account, which she used to post her digital pieces. She was known as La abuela del Paint ("The grandmother of Paint").

== Life and career ==
A native of Valencia, she spent her first 18 years learning how to draw at home. It was then that she was hired as a helper at a local photo lab, which led her to discover a passion for photography and for oil paintings. However, the strong smell of paint dissolvents discouraged her at the time from becoming an artist.

Despite this, her interest for the arts continued and she studied plastic arts at the Universitat Popular de Valencia. She took painting classes at a local community center, but had to give them up after her husband became ill and she became his caretaker. In 2004, when she was already in her mid 70s, her children gave her a computer. She began drawing with the Microsoft Paint program, and began posting her pieces to Facebook. In 2017, she started an Instagram account per a granddaughter's suggestion, which she used to post some of the drawings she made on Microsoft Paint. In March 2018 one of her pieces was shared on Twitter and went viral. In the following week, she had gained over 90,000 followers; by the next week, she had over 134,000. By the end of the year, Zaera's account had 185,000 followers.

In 2018, García Zaera was hired by the Disney Company to recreate the posters for their film, "Mary Poppins Returns".

García Zaera also established an online store in which she sold her drawings. Subjects included, among other things, animals, religious themes, and scenes inspired by her own life. She cited postcards and landscapes as inspirations. Zaera also said each of her pieces took about two weeks to create.

== Personal life and death ==
García Zaera had an unspecified number of daughters, one named Mar, as well as one son, various grandchildren and one great-grandson. Her husband of many years preceded her in death.

Concha García Zaera died on the morning of 20 July 2023, at the age of 93. Her children shared the news on her Instagram account. Several celebrities expressed sadness at her death, including singer Amaia, artists Carla Berrocal and Adara Sanchez, and philosopher Brigitte Vasallo.

== See also ==
- List of Spaniards
