= Juan Francisco García Sánchez =

Spanish judge (died 2023)

Juan Francisco García Sánchez (1936/1937 – 10 March 2023), was a Spanish judge, magistrate of the Supreme Court of Spain between 1999 and 2006.

== Career ==
After graduating in law from the University of Salamanca and as a social graduate from the Escuela Universitaria de León, García Sánchez entered the Judicial School by competitive examination in 1962, until 1964.

Between 1964 and 1973, he was a judge of first instance and instruction in Hervás (Cáceres) and Medina de Rioseco (Valladolid). That year, he entered the Corps of Labor Magistrates through a merit-based competition and was first assigned to the Provincial Labor Magistrate's Office in Girona.

From 1974 to the end of 1980 he served in the Labor Magistracy number 2 of León, after which he was appointed Dean of the then three Magistracies of the Province. In 1981 he was appointed Magistrate of the Provincial Court of León, becoming its president in 1990, being re-appointed in 1995. In 1999 he was appointed Judge of the Supreme Court of Spain, serving until his retirement at the age of 70 in the Labor Chamber. He retired in 2006, although he served as emeritus and support magistrate until 24 June 2011.

Until 1998, he was an associate professor of Procedural Law at the Law School of the University of León.

== Death ==
García Sánchez died on 10 March 2023 at the age of 86 in León.

== Honors ==
- Cross of Honor of the Order of Saint Raymond of Peñafort.
