= José Luis Álvarez (politician) =

Spanish politician (1930–2023)

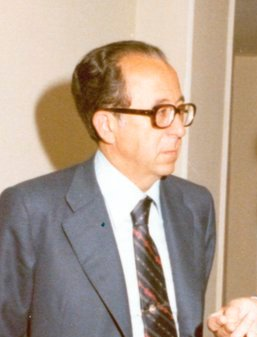
- Álvarez in 1980
- Born: José Luis Álvarez y Álvarez; 4 April 1930; Spain
- Died: 23 August 2023 (aged 93); Cape Palos, Cartagena, Spain
- Occupation(s): Mayor, minister and federal politician

José Luis Álvarez y Álvarez (4 April 1930 – 23 August 2023) was a Spanish politician. He was the city of Madrid's mayor from 3 March 1978 to 5 January 1979. He then worked with Adolfo Suárez and Leopoldo Calvo-Sotelo as Minister of Transport and Communications from 1980 to 1981. He also was the Minister of Agriculture, Fisheries and Food between 1981 and 1982. He was born in Madrid. Álvarez died at home in Cape Palos, Cartagena, on 23 August 2023, at the age of 93.
