= Ricardo García García-Ochoa =

Spanish politician (1944–2023)

Member of the Cortes of Castile and León for Burgos
- In office 2 July 1987 – 20 June 1991

Personal details
- Born: 25 July 1944 Aranda de Duero, Spain
- Died: 21 February 2023 (aged 78) Aranda de Duero, Spain
- Party: UCD; CDS
- Occupation: Lawyer

Ricardo García García-Ochoa (25 July 1944 – 21 February 2023) was a Spanish lawyer and politician. A member of the Democratic and Social Centre, he served in the Cortes of Castile and León from 1987 to 1991.

García died in Aranda de Duero on 21 February 2023, at the age of 78.
