= Elena Huelva =

Spanish influencer and writer (2002–2023)

- Huelva in March 2021
- Born: Elena Huelva Palomo; 21 May 2002; Seville, Spain
- Died: 3 January 2023 (aged 20); Seville, Spain
- Cause of death: Ewing sarcoma
- Citizenship: Spanish
- Occupations: Activist; influencer; writer
- Notable work: Mis ganas ganan
- Awards: Premio Bormujeres (2022); Hope Award (2022)

Elena Huelva Palomo (21 May 2002 – 3 January 2023) was a Spanish cancer activist, influencer, and writer. Through her regular use of social media, she divulged information about Ewing sarcoma, the type of cancer she was suffering from, to a wider audience, and demanded more investment for cancer research. She was credited with increasing the visibility of childhood bone cancer while dispelling misconceptions and myths about the disease.

== Activism ==
Huelva was born on 21 May 2002 in Seville, Spain, to Manuel Huelva and Emilia Palomo. She became an Ewing sarcoma patient, after being diagnosed with the disease on 3 January 2019 at the age of 16. She gained fame for disclosing her experiences with the disease through social media, amassing over 950,000 followers on Instagram.

Huelva promoted cancer research and the phrase "Mis ganas ganan" (English: "My will wins") to describe her attitude against the disease.

Since 2019, she collaborated with multiple cancer-related non-profit organisations. In 2022, she wrote the book "Mis ganas ganan. Nadie nos ha prometido un mañana, vive el presente" (English: "My will wins. Nobody has promised us a tomorrow, live the present"), where she recounted her cancer experience. Her contribution increasing the visibility of Ewing sarcoma resulted in a greater number of donations from private initiatives, and exposed the lack of public funding in Spain for research into this rare disease.

On 25 March 2022, she was awarded the Premio Bormujeres in the field of Youth and Communication, conferred by the city council of Bormujos. In October of the same year, she received the Hope Award from Elle magazine, presented to her by singer Manuel Carrasco.

In December 2022, she designed a scarf for the toy "Baby Pelón", launched by the Juegaterapia Foundation to raise funds for Ewing sarcoma research. For this purpose, the Juegaterapia Foundation established the "Elena Huelva Grant" in collaboration with the Spanish Group for Sarcoma Research (GEIS).

== Death and aftermath ==
Huelva died on 3 January 2023, at the age of 20, after a continuous aggravation of her disease. Her death triggered an outpouring of grief on social media platforms. Public figures expressing their condolences included Spanish TV presenter Sara Carbonero, singers Pastora Soler and Manuel Carrasso, musician Alejandro Sanz, actress Ana Obregón, President of the Government of Andalusia Juan Manuel Moreno, and football clubs Real Betis, of which she was a supporter, and Sevilla FC.

Huelva's funeral service was held on 4 January 2023, attended by Carbonero and the film director Alberto Rodríguez Librero. Huelva was cremated in the mortuary-crematorium of Camas, Seville.

On 5 January 2023, Real Betis dedicated to Huelva its victory over CD Ibiza Islas Pitiusas during the Copa del Rey match played at the Estadi Municipal de Can Misses, in the city of Ibiza.

Two months after her death, it was announced that the proceeds from sales of the "Baby Pelón" toy designed by Huelva amounted to €87,000. This donation to Ewing sarcoma research, channelled through the "Elena Huelva Grant", allowed Spanish participation in the international clinical trial Inter-Ewing-1.
