= Jesús Mancha =

Spanish politician (1941–2023)

Member of the Congress of Deputies for Cádiz
- In office 5 April 2000 – 15 January 2008

Member of the Senate of Spain
- In office 27 March 1996 – 18 January 2000

Member of the Parliament of Andalusia for Cádiz
- In office 16 July 1990 – 5 April 2000

Personal details
- Born: Jesús Andrés Mancha Cadenas; 30 November 1941 Almendralejo, Spain
- Died: 5 May 2023 (aged 81) Cádiz, Spain
- Party: PP

Jesús Andrés Mancha Cadenas (30 November 1941 – 5 May 2023) was a Spanish politician. A member of the People's Party, he served in the Senate from 1996 to 2000 and the Congress of Deputies from 2000 to 2008.

Mancha died in Cádiz on 5 May 2023, at the age of 81.
