= Rania Awaad =

Egyptian-American Islamic scholar

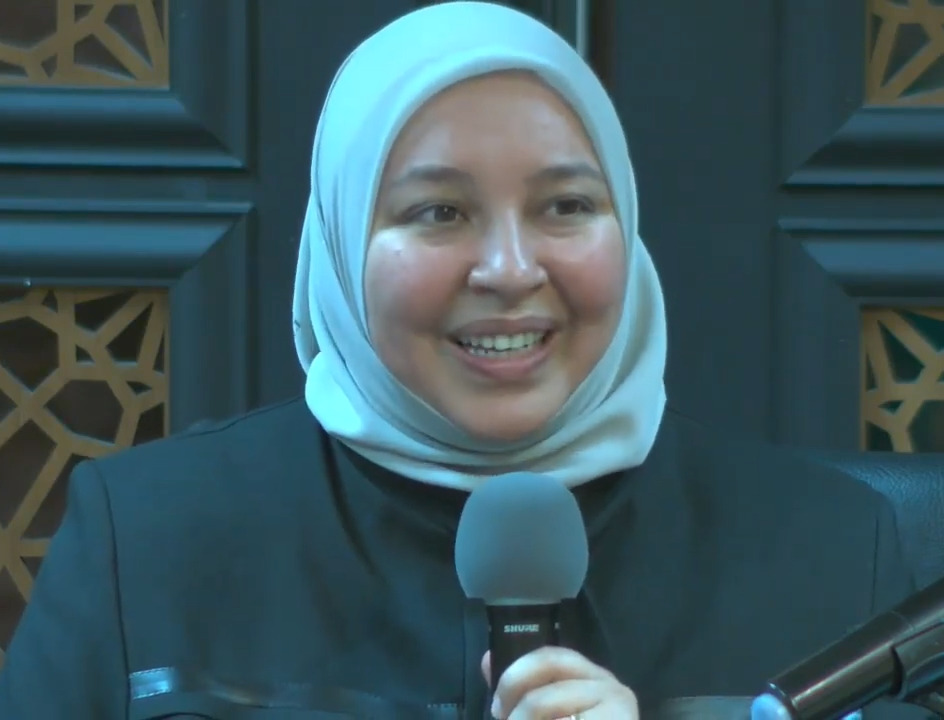
- Awaad in 2023
- Citizenship: Egyptian-American
- Known for: Work on mental health of Muslim Americans
- Medical career
- Field: Psychiatry

Personal life
- Education: Stanford University

Religious life
- Religion: Islam
- Denomination: Sunni
- Jurisprudence: Shafi'i
- Arabic name
- Personal (Ism): Rāniyā رانيا
- Patronymic (Nasab): bint ʿAwāḍ بنت عواض

Rania Awaad is an Egyptian-American Islamic scholar, psychiatrist, and professor. Awaad is a Clinical Professor of Psychiatry at the Stanford Department of Psychiatry and Behavioral Science. Awaad is known for her work on Islam and psychology and the mental health of Muslim Americans.

== Biography ==
Awaad is a practicing psychiatrist and professor associated with Stanford University, where she is director of the Diversity Clinic and the Muslim Mental Health lab and chief of the Diversity section. Awaad is an activist for mental health among Muslim Americans.

Awaad studied Islam from the age of 14 in Damascus, Syria. She received ijazah to teach tajwid in the Hafs and Warsh recitations of the Quran. She also received ijaza in Shafi'i legal texts and Maliki fiqh, adab, and ihsan.

Awaad was the first female professor of Islamic law at Zaytuna College, where she taught Shafi'i jurisprudence, women's jurisprudential issues, and the Quran.

She is also a senior fellow at the Institute for Social Policy and Understanding and Yaqeen Institute.

== Works ==
=== Books ===
- Islamophobia and Psychiatry: Recognition, Prevention, and Treatment edited by Ahmed Zakaria Hankir, H. Steven Moffic, John Peteet, and Rania Awaad (Springer International Publishing, 2018)
- Applying Islamic Principles to Clinical Mental Health Care: Introducing Traditional Islamically Integrated Psychotherapy edited by Bilal Ali, Fahad Khan, Hooman Keshavarzi, and Rania Awaad (Taylor & Francis, 2020)
- Maristāns and Islāmic Psychology: A Historical Model for Modern Implementation Rania Awaad and Merve Nursoy-Demir (Routledge, 2024)
