= Alexis Ravelo =

Spanish novelist (1971–2023)

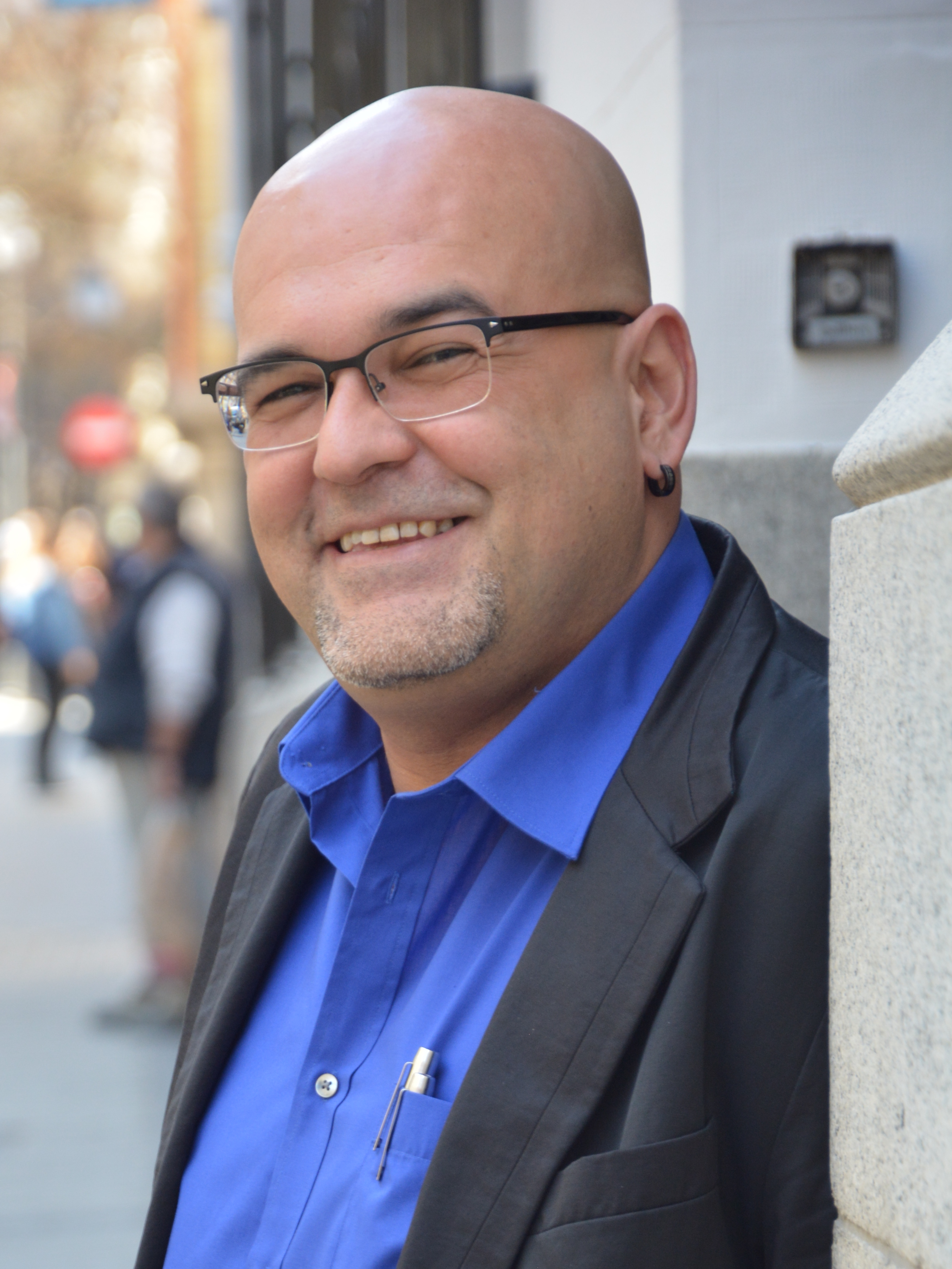
- Born: Alexis Ravelo Betancor; 20 August 1971; Las Palmas, Province of Las Palmas
- Died: 30 January 2023 (aged 51); Las Palmas, Province of Las Palmas
- Occupation: Writer, opinion writer, lecturer
- Style: noir fiction
- Awards: Getafe Black Novel City Award (La última tumba, 2013); Premio Hammett (La estrategia del pequinés, 2014); Café Gijón Award (2021); Dearest Son of Las Palmas de Gran Canaria (2022)
- Website: alexisravelo.wordpress.com

Alexis Ravelo Betancor (Las Palmas de Gran Canaria 20 August 1971 – 30 January 2023) was a spanish writer who published crime fiction, short stories and flash fiction. His best known work is La estrategia del Pekinés, among other hardboiled novels featuring the atypical detective Eladio Monroy.

== Novels ==
- Tres funerales para Eladio Monroy, Anroart, 2006.
- La noche de piedra (La iniquidad I), Anroart, 2007.
- Sólo los muertos [Eladio Monroy 2], Anroart, 2008.
- Los días de mercurio (La iniquidad II), Anroart, 2010.
- Los tipos duros no leen poesía [Eladio Monroy 3], Anroart, 2011.
- Morir despacio [Eladio Monroy 4], Anroart, 2012.
- La estrategia del pequinés, Alrevés, 2013.
- La última tumba, EDAF, 2013.
- Las flores no sangran, Alrevés 2015.
- La otra vida de Ned Blackbird, Siruela, 2016.
- Los milagros prohibidos, Siruela, 2017.
- El peor de los tiempos [Eladio Monroy 5], Alrevés, 2017.
- La ceguera del cangrejo, Siruela, 2019.
- Un tío con una bolsa en la cabeza, Siruela, 2020.
- Si no hubiera mañana [Eladio Monroy 6], Alrevés, 2021.
- Los nombres prestados, Siruela, 2022.
