= Rodolfo Ares =

Spanish politician (1954–2023)

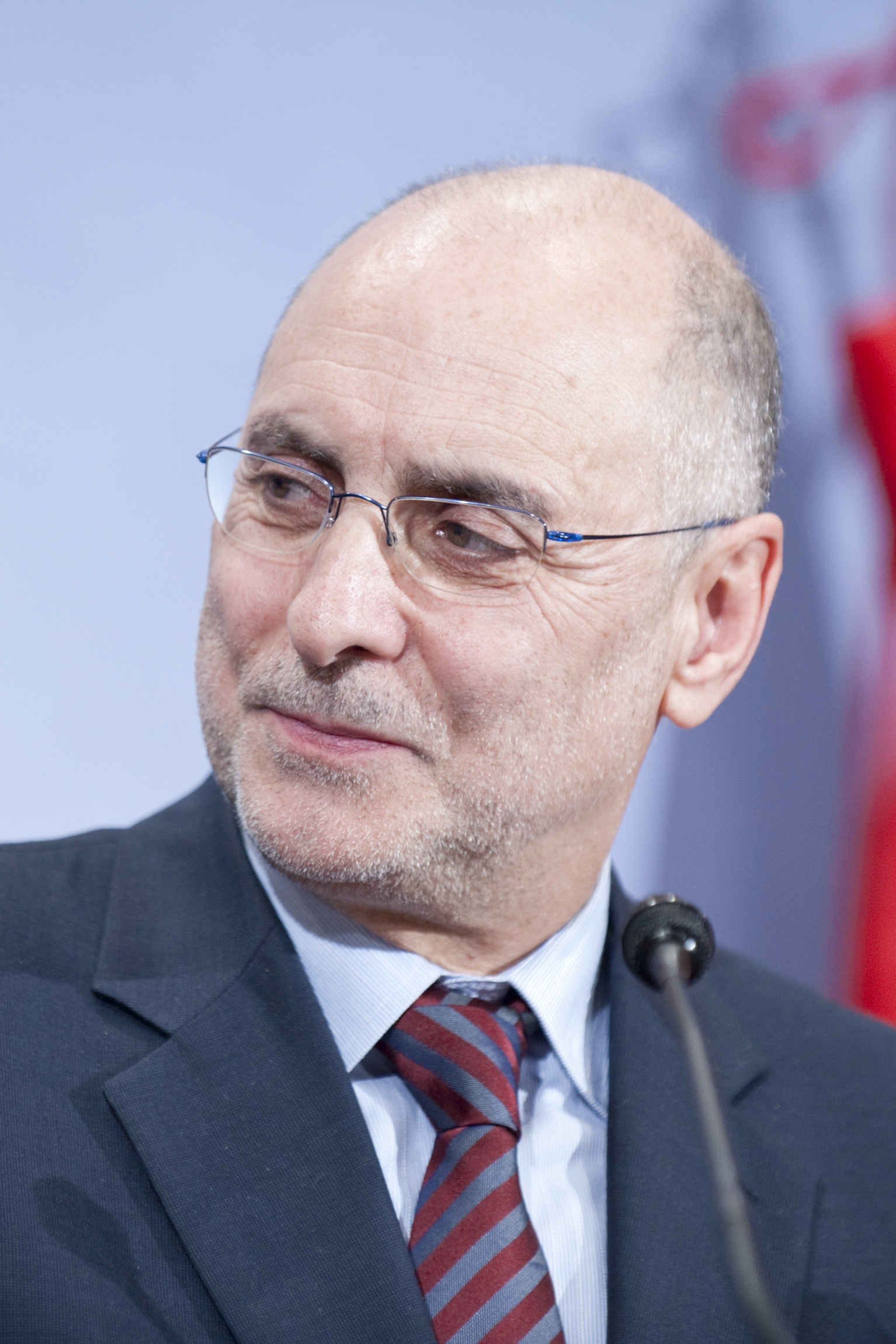
- Ares in 2010

Minister of the Interior of the Basque Government
- In office 9 May 2009 – 29 August 2012
- Preceded by: Javier Balza
- Succeeded by: Idoia Mendia

Member of the Basque Parliament for Biscay
- In office 20 November 2012 – 26 May 2016
- In office 23 October 1994 – 9 May 2009

Personal details
- Born: Rodolfo Ares Taboada; 25 June 1954 Riós, Spain
- Died: 26 January 2023 (aged 68) Bilbao, Spain
- Party: PSE-EE

Rodolfo Ares Taboada (25 June 1954 – 26 January 2023) was a Spanish politician. A member of the Socialist Party of the Basque Country–Basque Country Left, he served in the Basque Parliament from 1994 to 2009 and again from 2012 to 2016.

Ares died in Bilbao on 26 January 2023, at the age of 68.
