= Jesús Ruiz (politician) =

Spanish schoolteacher and politician (died 2023)

President of the Diputación Provincial de Cádiz
- In office 1990–1995
- Preceded by: Alfonso Perales
- Succeeded by: Rafael Román Guerrero

Member of the Congress of Deputies for Cádiz
- In office 9 July 1986 – 2 September 1989

Personal details
- Born: Jesús Ruiz Fernández
- Died: 11 June 2023 Arcos de la Frontera, Spain
- Party: PSOE
- Occupation: Schoolteacher

Jesús Ruiz Fernández (died 11 June 2023) was a Spanish politician.

A member of the Spanish Socialist Workers' Party, he served in the Congress of Deputies from 1986 to 1989.

Ruiz died on 11 June 2023, in Arcos de la Frontera, of a long illness complicated by a COVID-19 infection.
