= José Javier Viñes Rueda =

Spanish politician (1937–2023)

- Viñes in 1996

Member of the Parliament of Navarre
- In office 1999–2003
- In office 1983–1991

Member of the Senate of Spain for Navarre
- In office 21 November 1989 – 13 April 1993

Personal details
- Born: 17 February 1937 Soria, Spain
- Died: 25 January 2023 (aged 85) Pamplona, Spain
- Party: UPN
- Education: University of Navarra; Public University of Navarre
- Occupation: Doctor

José Javier Viñes Rueda (17 February 1937 – 25 January 2023) was a Spanish doctor and politician. A member of the Navarrese People's Union, he served in the Parliament of Navarre from 1999 to 2003 and in the Senate from 1989 to 1993.

Viñes died in Pamplona on 25 January 2023 at the age of 85.
