= Fernando Elboj Broto =

Spanish politician (1946–2023)

Member of the Senate of Spain for Huesca
- In office 1 March 2008 – 29 September 2011
- In office 28 October 1982 – 28 October 1989

Personal details
- Born: 14 July 1946 Huesca, Spain
- Died: 30 January 2023 (aged 76) Huesca, Spain
- Party: PSOE
- Occupation: Schoolteacher

Fernando Elboj Broto (14 July 1946 – 30 January 2023) was a Spanish politician and schoolteacher. A member of the Spanish Socialist Workers' Party, he served in the Senate from 1982 to 1989 and again from 2008 to 2011.

Elboj died in Huesca on 30 January 2023, at the age of 76.
