= 2023 in France =

- Decades: 2000s; 2010s; 2020s; 2030s
- See also: History of France; Timeline of French history; List of years in France

Events in the year 2023 in France.

== Incumbents ==
- President – Emmanuel Macron (REM)
- Prime Minister – Élisabeth Borne (REM)
- Government – Borne government

== Events ==
=== January ===
- 7 January – Emmanuel Macron is interviewed on the television programme Les Rencontres du Papotin.
- 11 January – Six people are injured in a mass stabbing at Paris' Gare du Nord train station.
- 19 January – 2023 French pension reform strikes
  - Strikes and demonstrations begin throughout France against the government's pension reform project, which plans to raise the retirement age to 64.
- 21 January – RT France, the French arm of the Russian state media network RT, ceases operation following the freezing of their bank accounts by the Direction générale du Trésor.
- 25 January – France agrees to withdraw its 400 special forces from Burkina Faso, following the mandate from the ruling military junta that they withdraw within a month.
- 31 January – 2023 French pension reform strikes
  - A second day of strikes and demonstrations occur throughout France against the government's pension reform project, which proposes to raise the retirement age to 64. According to the CGT union, 2.8 million people took part in the protests while the Ministry of Internal Affairs counted 1.272 million protesters.
  - About 25% of teachers are on strike according to the Ministry of National Education. This figure is 55% according to the teachers' union SNES-fu.

=== February ===
- 7 February – 2023 French pension reform strikes
  - A third day of national protests are held, attended by over 2 million strikers, 400,000 in Paris alone, according to the CGT, while the police estimate that around 757,000 strikers participated.
- 11 February – 2023 French pension reform strikes
  - A fourth day of national protests are held, attended by over 2.5 million strikers, 500,000 of whom were in Paris, according to the CGT, whilst the Ministry of the Interior claims that 963,000 protested.
- 16 February – 2023 French pension reform strikes
  - Unions said some 1.3 million people participated in strikes nationwide, with 30 percent of flights from Paris' Orly Airport being cancelled.
- 22 February – Murder of Agnès Lassalle

=== March ===
- 4 March – Twenty-one people are injured in a bus crash in Corps, Auvergne-Rhône-Alpes.
- 7 March – 2023 French pension reform strikes
  - Trains around the country continued to be affected by strikes and protests, with 1.1 to 1.4 million people believed to have participated in over 260 protests across the country.
- 20 March – March 2023 votes of no confidence in the government of Élisabeth Borne motions were voted down. The cross-party motion failed by a margin of just 9 votes.
- 23 March – Palais Rohan in Bordeaux is set on fire by protesters.

=== April ===
- 9 April –
  - 2023 Marseille building collapse
  - Six people are killed and many others injured by an avalanche near Mont Blanc, in the French Alps.
- 20 April – Operation Wuambushu

=== May ===
- 11 May – The National Assembly votes 130 to 109 for a bill that not only would town halls in have to fly both the French and European flags but also all town halls must display a presidential portrait. The bill goes to the Senate
- 21 May – Three people are killed in a gang shooting in the 11th arrondissement of Marseille.

=== June ===
- 8 June – Six children are injured during a mass stabbing in Lake Annecy, Haute-Savoie. The Syrian perpetrator, a failed asylum seeker, is arrested. A motive behind the attack is still unclear.
- 16 June – A magnitude 4.8 earthquake strikes Niort, Deux-Sèvres, Nouvelle-Aquitaine, injuring two people and severely damaging hundreds of buildings.
- 21 June – 2023 Paris explosion: Around 50 people are injured and one is missing after an explosion and fire on Rue Saint-Jacques in Paris.
- 27 June – Killing of Nahel Merzouk: A 17-year-old boy is shot dead by a police officer after an attempted traffic stop in Nanterre, Hauts-de-Seine, Île-de-France. Due to the incident, rioting breaks out.
- 28 June – Nahel Merzouk riots: Riots occur in several towns following the killing of Merzouk by a police officer. At least 150 people are arrested, 24 police officers are injured, and 40 cars are set alight. Town halls, schools, and police stations are also set on fire or attacked.
- 29 June – Nahel Merzouk riots: Rioting continues for a third night across France with at least 100 people being arrested as 40,000 police officers are deployed to tackle the unrest. A town hall is set on fire in Clichy-sous-Bois, while supermarkets and other shops are looted by gangs in Nantes and Montreuil, Seine-Saint-Denis.
- 30 June –
  - Killing of Nahel Merzouk: The police officer involved in the killing of Merzouk is charged with homicide.
  - Nahel Merzouk riots: Rioters set fire to the main public library in Marseille as civil unrest continues across France. More than 900 people have been arrested and Interior Minister Gérald Darmanin deploys an additional 45,000 police officers to the streets.

=== July ===
- 1 July –
  - Nahel Merzouk riots: Riots continue across France. More than 1,300 arrests, and 79 police officers injured.
  - Looters raid a gun shop in Marseille, stealing eight hunting rifles and ammunition before police intervene.
  - President Emmanuel Macron cancels a state visit to Germany, which would have been the first state visit in 23 years.
- 2 July – Nahel Merzouk riots: Rioters ram-raid and set ablaze the residence of L'Haÿ-les-Roses mayor Vincent Jeanbrun, a member of the centre-right Republicans party, injuring the mayor's wife and child. Jeanbrun was at the town hall during the incident.
- 3 July – Hundreds march in support of Mayor Vincent Jeanbrun, whose house was set ablaze on Sunday morning.

=== August ===
- 9 August – Nine people are killed and two others are missing after a fire breaks out in a guesthouse accommodating disabled people in Wintzenheim, Alsace.
- 13 August – Three people are killed and eighteen are injured in a fire in an apartment complex in Grasse, Alpes-Maritimes.
- 14 August – France announces that supermarket prices increased 13.1% in July according to the national statistics bureau.
- 27 August – France announces plans to ban the Islamic abaya dress in schools.

=== September ===
- 3 September – French Prime Minister Élisabeth Borne says that France will ban disposable vapes in an effort to combat smoking.
- 19–22 September – State visit by Charles III to France
- 23 September – Teenager Lina Delsarte disappears from her home in Alsace.
- 24 September - 2023 French Senate election

=== October ===
- 4 October – The government bans Civitas an Traditionalist Catholic, integrist association and political party.
- 12 October – French Interior Minister Gérald Darmanin announces that France will ban all pro-Palestinian protests in the country.
- 13 October – Arras school stabbing: A teacher is killed and another teacher and a security guard are seriously wounded in a stabbing attack at a high school in Arras, Hauts-de-France. The Ingush Russian Muslim immigrant attacker, heard shouting "Allahu akbar" during the attack, is arrested by police.
- 14 October – France raises its Vigipirate to the highest level and announces the deployment of 7,000 soldiers through Opération Sentinelle following the Arras stabbing, which President Emmanuel Macron describes as "Islamist terror".
- 18 October – The Palace of Versailles and three French airports are temporarily evacuated "for security reasons".

=== November ===
- 6 November – French Armed Forces Minister Sébastien Lecornu announces that France will donate dozens of armoured vehicles to the Lebanese military to help it carry out patrol missions.
- 13 November – Over 182,000 demonstrators march in cities across France, protesting the surge in antisemitic incidents since the outbreak of the Gaza war.
- 15 November – France issues arrest warrants for Syrian president Bashar al-Assad and his brother Maher al-Assad on charges of crimes against humanity and complicity in war crimes, including the 2013 Ghouta chemical attack.
- 19 November
  - One of French emperor Napoleon's bicorne hats is sold for a record €1.93 million (around US$2.11 million) at an auction in France.
  - Crépol stabbing
- 26 November – The Junior Eurovision Song Contest 2023 is held in Nice, France. France wins the competition with the song "Cœur" ("Heart"), performed by Zoé Clauzure.
- 28 November – Health Minister Aurélien Rousseau announces a ban on smoking on all beaches and public parks.

=== December ===
- 2 December – 2023 Paris attack
- 25 December - In Paris, was produced the Sportica Fire in Gravenilles, France, causing several damages
- 26 December – In Paris, a man is arrested for killing his four children and their mother. The mother and two daughters were stabbed several times, while the couple’s two sons were suffocated or drowned.
- 31 December – The Château du Grand-Serquigny in Normandy is destroyed by fire.

== Deaths ==
=== January ===
- 1 January – Jacques Sereys, 94, actor (On Guard, Chouchou, Towards Zero).
- 2 January –
  - Alain Acard, 71, Olympic sprint canoer (1972, 1976).
  - Catherine David, 73, French-American literary critic and novelist.
  - François Geindre, 76, politician, mayor of Hérouville-Saint-Clair (1971–2001).
- 4 January – Michel Ferté, 64, racing driver.
- 5 January – Jean Clémentin, 98, journalist (Le Canard enchaîné), writer, and spy.
- 6 January –
  - Marc-Kanyan Case, 80, Olympic footballer (1968).
  - Jacques Grattarola, 92, footballer (Cannes, Saint-Étienne).
- 7 January –
  - Marcelle Engelen Faber, 99, resistance fighter.
  - Henri Heurtebise, 86, poet and editor.
- 8 January –
  - Michel Laurencin, 78, academic and historian.
  - Christiane Papon, 98, politician, MEP (1987–1989) and deputy (1988–1993).
- 9 January – Max Chantal, 64, rugby league player (Villeneuve XIII, national team).
- 10 January – Pierre Dorsini, 88, footballer (Toulouse, Nancy).
- 11 January – François Roussely, 78, government official and magistrate, president of Électricité de France (1998–2004).
- 12 January –
  - Jean Laurent, 78, banker and businessman, managing director of Crédit Agricole (1999–2005).
  - Daniel Richard, 78, entrepreneur.
- 13 January –
  - Madeleine Attal, 101, actress and theatre director.
  - Fañch Peru, 82, teacher, writer and politician, mayor of Berhet (1983–2001).
- 14 January – Bernard Delemotte, 83, diver and cameraman.
- 15 January – Noël Coulet, 90, academic and historian.
- 16 January – Pierre Danos, 93, rugby union player (RC Toulon, AS Béziers Hérault, national team).
- 17 January –
  - Jean-Claude Marty, 79, rugby league player (FC Lézignan XIII, Racing Club Albi XIII, national team).
  - Lucile Randon, 118, supercentenarian, world's oldest living person (since 2022).
  - Paul Vecchiali, 92, film director (At the Top of the Stairs, Rosa la rose, fille publique, Once More) and author.
- 18 January –
  - Jacques Jarry, 93, linguist and archeologist.
  - Paul Vecchiali, 92, film director (At the Top of the Stairs, Rosa la rose, fille publique, Once More) and author.
  - Marcel Zanini, 99, Turkish-born French jazz musician.
- 19 January –
  - Gilles Beyer, 66, figure skater and skating coach.
  - Claude Guillon, 70, writer and philosopher.
- 20 January – Loïc Guguen, dramatic baritone.
- 23 January –
  - Serge Laget, 66, board game designer (Mare Nostrum, Mystery of the Abbey).
  - Roland Weller, 84, businessman, president of RC Strasbourg Alsace (1994–1997).
- 24 January – Christelle Doumergue, 59, basketball player (Clermont UC, Tango Bourges Basket, national team).
- 25 January –
  - Maria Deroche, 84, Brazilian-born French architect.
  - Roger Louret, 72, actor, playwright, and theatre director.
- 26 January – Attilio Labis, 86, ballet dancer and teacher.
- 28 January – Gérard Caillaud, 76, actor (The Accuser, L'argent des autres, The Dogs) and stage director.
- 29 January – Adama Niane, 56, actor (Get In, Lupin).

=== March ===
- 17 March – Habib Qahwaji, 91, Palestinian political activist and writer

=== June ===
- 2 June – Jacques Rozier, 96, film director and screenwriter (Adieu Philippine, Du Cote D'Orouet).
- 18 June – Paul-Henri Nargeolet, 77, explorer and victim of the Titan submersible implosion.
- 26 June – Ysabelle Lacamp, 68, writer and actress.
- 27 June - Nahel Merzouk, Nahel Merzouk (sometimes spelled Naël), a 17-year-old French youth of Maghrebian Algerian descent, was shot and killed by a police officer during a traffic stop

=== July ===
- 11 July – Milan Kundera, 94, Czech-born French writer (The Joke, The Unbearable Lightness of Being).
- 16 July – Jane Birkin, 76, British-French actress (Death on the Nile, Evil Under the Sun) and singer ("Je t'aime... moi non plus").

=== October ===
- 6 October – Victoire Jasmin, 67, French Senator from Guadaloupe.
- 24 October – Marcel Berthomé, 101, Mayor and war veteran.

=== November ===
- 13 November – Michel Ciment, 85, film critic and historian.
- 19 November – Colette Maze, 109, pianist and piano teacher.
- 22 November – Emmanuel Le Roy Ladurie, 94, historian.

=== December ===
- 12 December – Denise Cacheux, 91, politician.
- 27 December – Juliette Carré, 90, actress.
- 29 December – Gil de Ferran, 56, French-born Brazilian professional racing driver.

== See also ==
=== Country overviews ===
- History of France
- History of modern France
- Outline of France
- Government of France
- Politics of France
- Years in France
- Timeline of France history
- List of French films of 2023
