= Fañch Peru =

French teacher, writer, and politician (1940–2023)

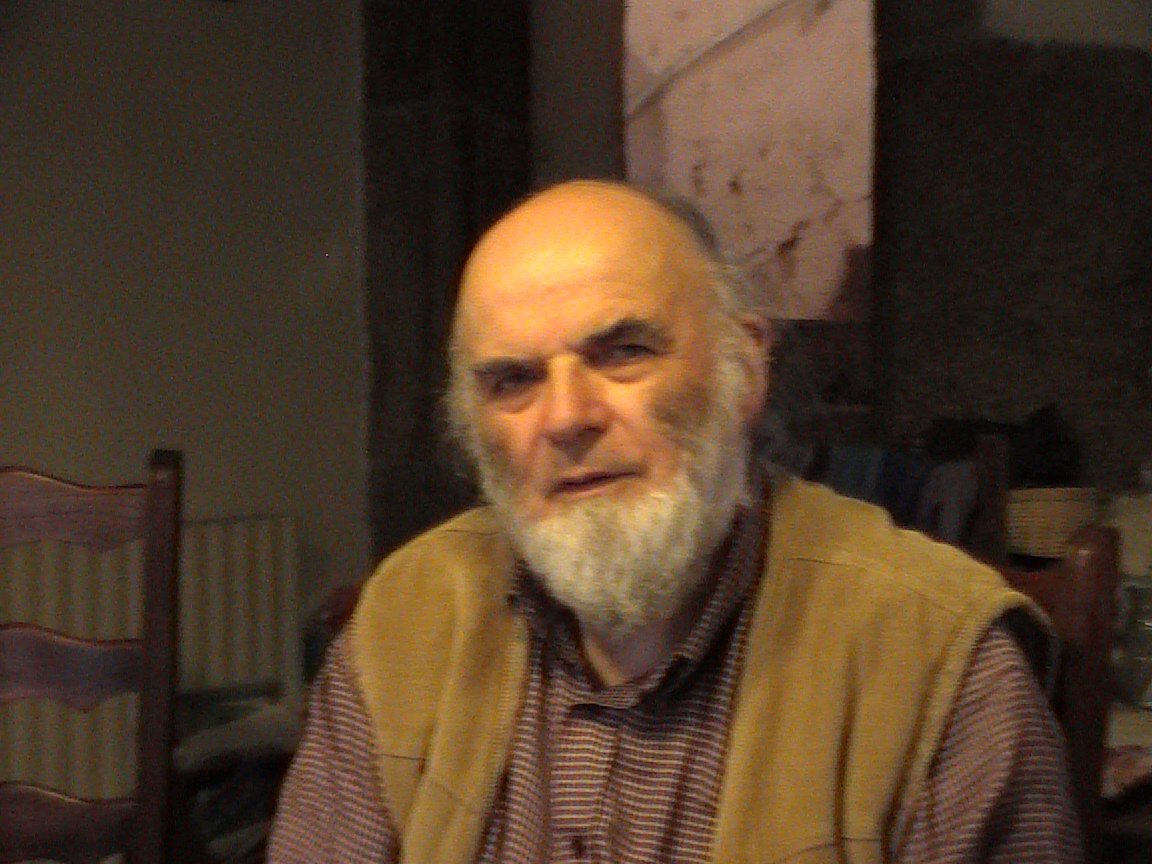

Mayor of Berhet
- In office March 1983 – March 2001
- Preceded by: Louis Merrer
- Succeeded by: Jean-Yves Bourveau

Personal details
- Born: François Le Peru; 8 February 1940 Ploubezre, France
- Died: 13 January 2023 (aged 82)
- Party: UDB
- Occupation: Teacher; Writer

François Le Peru (8 February 1940 – 13 January 2023), known by the pen name Fañch Peru, was a French teacher and writer of the Breton language.

== Biography ==
Le Peru worked as a teacher in Tréguier for many years, where he was a member of the Cercle Culturel Ernest Renan. He wrote articles in numerous Breton-language newspapers and magazines, such as Brud, Ar Falz, and Le Peuple breton. As a member of the Breton Democratic Union, he served as mayor of Berhet from 1983 to 2001.

Fañch Peru died on 13 January 2023, at the age of 82.

== Works ==
- Ur c'huzhiad avaloù douss-trenk (1985)
- Teñzor run ar gov (1988)
- Glizarc'hant (1988)
- Bugel ar c'hoad (1989)
- An Traoniennoù glas (1993)
- Enezenn an eñvor (1994)
- Etrezek an aber sall (1995)
- 60 pennad e brezhoneg bev (1996)
- Kernigelled ar goanv (1997)
- Hentoù ar C'hornog (1998)
- Eñvorennoù Melen ki bihan rodellek (1999)
- Va enezenn din-me (2000)
- Eus an aod vev d'ar c'hoad don (2002)
- Gwaskado (2004)
- Gwenodennoù hon hunvreoù (2007)
- Kanfarded Milin ar Wern (2008)
- Ur vuhez kazh (2010)
- Kan ar stivell (2012)
- Bigorned-sukr ha bara mel (2014)
- Ar C'hizeller hag ar Vorganez (2016)
- E Seizh avel ar bed (2021)
