= Maria Deroche =

French architect (1938–2023)

- Born: 21 July 1938; São Paulo, Brazil
- Died: 25 January 2023 (aged 84)
- Education: Faculty of Architecture and Urbanism, University of São Paulo
- Occupation: Architect

Maria Deroche (21 July 1938 – 25 January 2023) was a Brazilian-born French architect.

== Biography ==
Born in São Paulo on 21 July 1938, Deroche studied at the Faculty of Architecture and Urbanism, University of São Paulo and graduated in 1963. She had studied alongside brutalist architects Paulo Mendes da Rocha and Vilanova Artigas.

Deroche moved to France in 1963 and worked for Bernard Zehrfuss and ANPAR, where she was directed by Michel Andrault and Pierre Parat. In 1971, she joined the Atelier d'urbanisme et d'architecture, where she became a partner in 1977 alongside her husband, Jean. The couple left in 1985 and co-founded the Atelier d'urbanisme et d'architecture Jean et Maria Deroche. In 1990, she signed the Appel des 250 calling for opposition to the rise of the National Front.

Maria Deroche died on 25 January 2023, at the age of 84.
