= Madonna delle Lacrime, Siracusa =

Church in Sicily, Italy

Basilica Sanctuary Madonna delle Lacrime
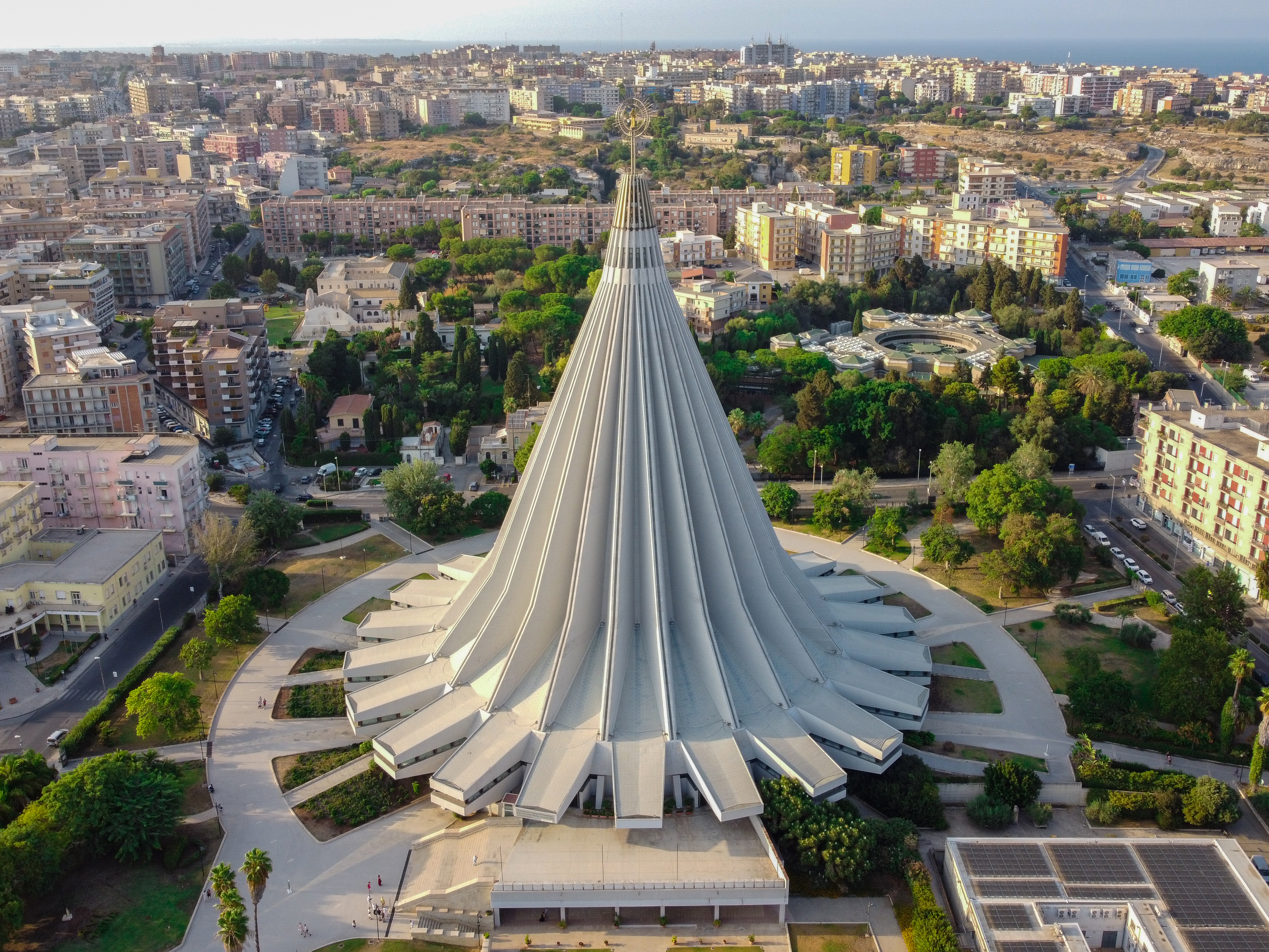
- The spire-domed church in 2021

Religion
- Affiliation: Catholic Church
- Province: Syracuse
- Year consecrated: 1994

Location
- Location: Syracuse, Sicily, Italy
- Interactive map of Basilica Sanctuary Madonna delle Lacrime

Architecture
- Architects: Michel Andrault and Pierre Parat
- Type: Church
- Groundbreaking: 1966
- Completed: 1994

Website
- www.madonnadellelacrime.it

The Basilica of the Madonna delle Lacrime (Sanctuary of the Virgin of Tears), also called Madonnina delle Lacrime is a 20th-century Roman Catholic Marian shrine church in Syracuse in Sicily, Italy. The modern building, derided by some as an inverted ice-cream cone, dominates the skyline of the approach to Ortigia.

== Description ==
An international competition was held to design the church, and the design by Michel Andrault and Pierre Parat was selected. The main engineer for construction was Riccardo Morandi. Construction of the shrine began in 1966, but was only complete by 1994. During construction, the foundations were found to contain a crypt, likely a paleo-christian mausoleum, now in the inferior rooms of the church. The building initially was planned to be larger, but at 103 metres high, it was truncated some 30 metres. The church is adjacent to the Catacombs of San Giovanni and the Basilica of San Marziano.

The construction and design of the sanctuary was highly controversial. There are various interpretations of the design, including that it is meant to suggest a giant teardrop impacting the earth. The construction atop an archeologic site required special permission. Others objected to the construction of such a pretentious structure to honour the putative miracle, occurring from August 29 to September 1, 1953, when a plaster icon of the Madonna of the Immaculate Heart was claimed to have shed tears for an indigent local couple, including a fisherman husband. The event was putatively observed by crowds and included even sampling of the chemistry of fluids. The icon was subsequently moved from their abode in via degli Orti here.

The first stone for construction was consecrated in 1954. In 2002 Pope John Paul II elevated the sanctuary to the status of a minor basilica. In 2019, the Episcopal Conference of Sicily titled it a regional sanctuary.

Atop the dome is a gilded bronze statue of the Madonna in rings with rays, by Francesco Caldarella. The square altar with a bronze base, has four panels depicting scenes from the Apocalyptic visions of the Book of Revelation. The inscription quotes St Paul in his Epistle to the Ephesians: Cristo ha amato la Chiesa e ha dato se stesso per lei.

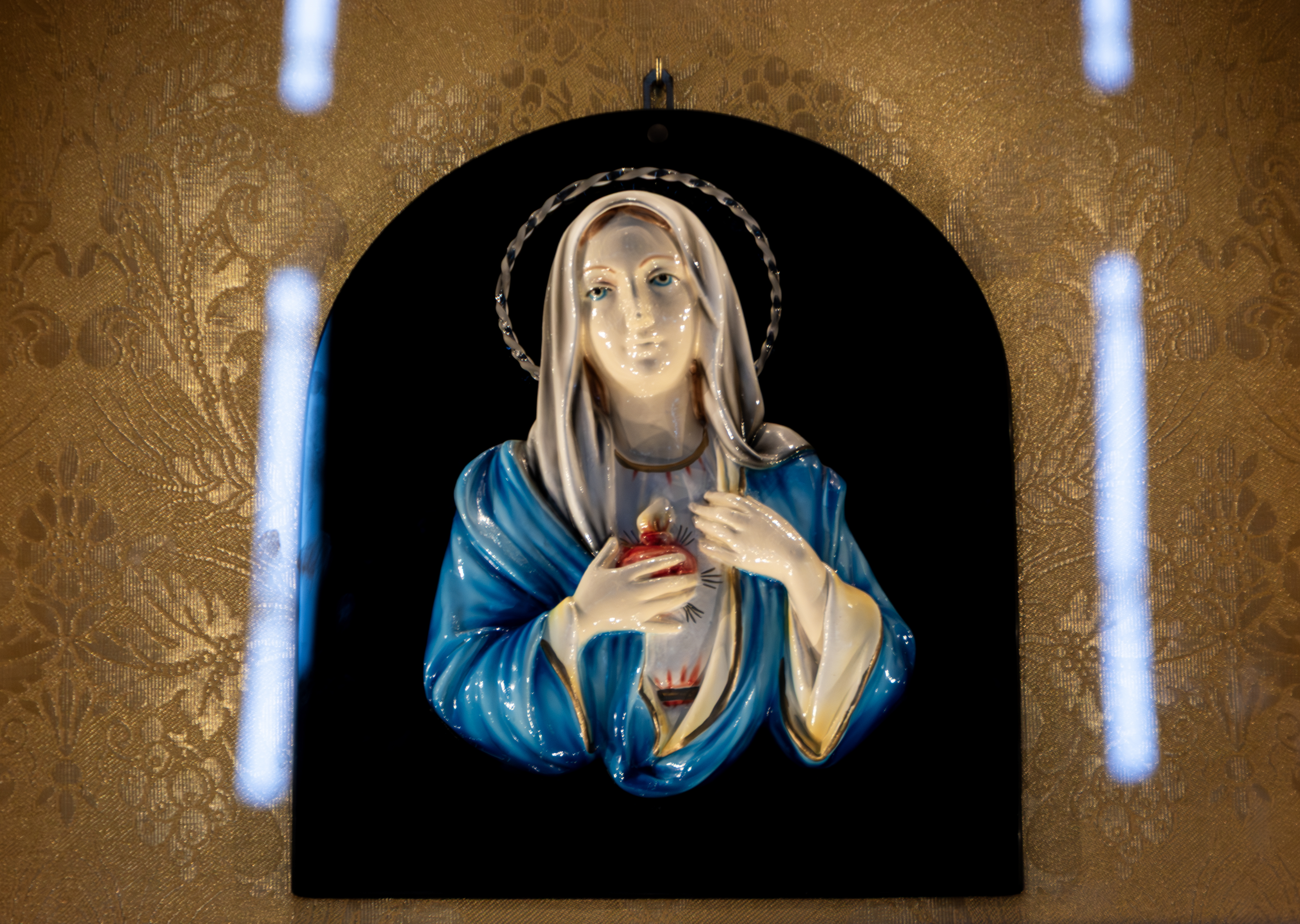
The miraculous weeping statue of the Virgin Mary in the altar

== Gallery ==
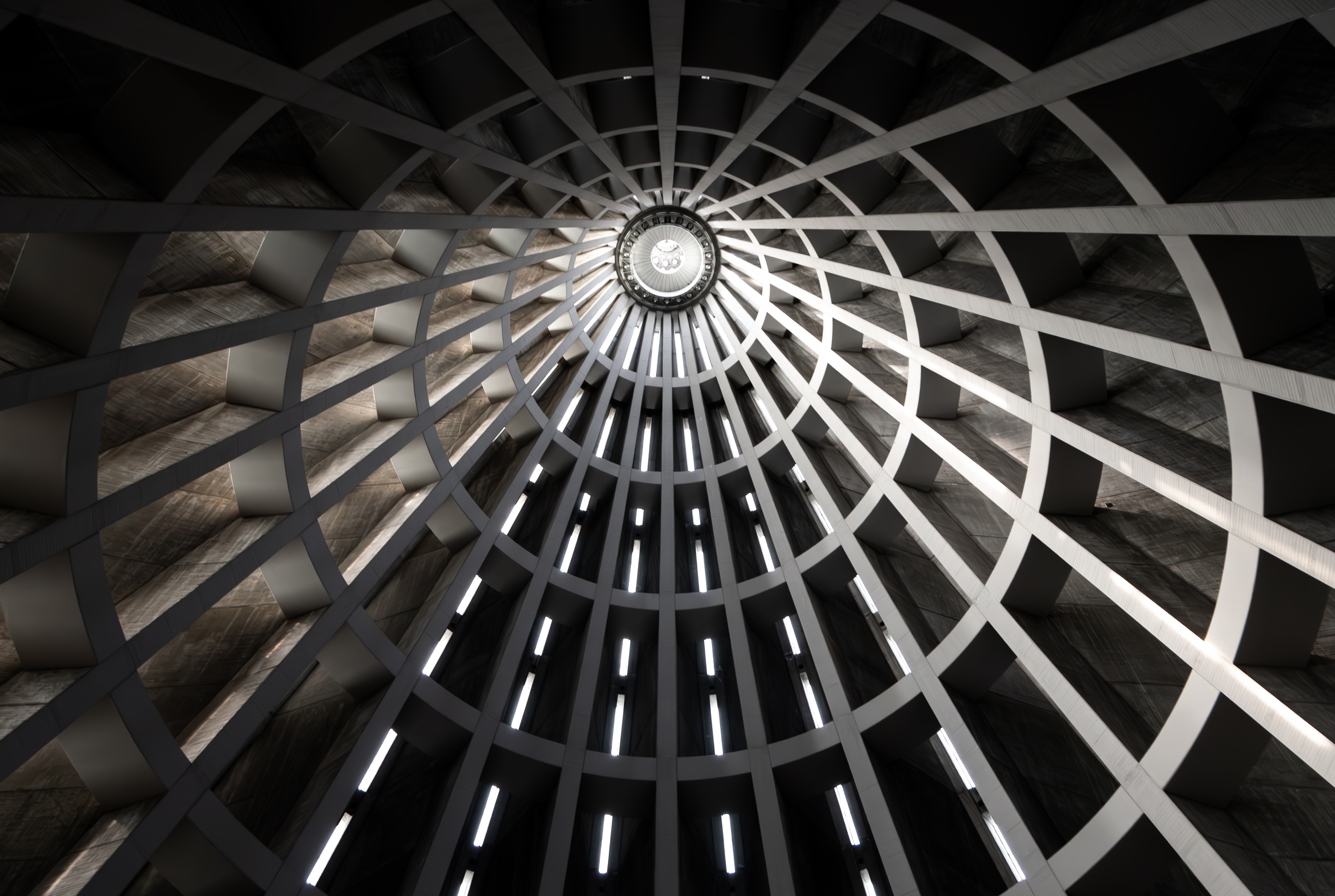
Ceiling

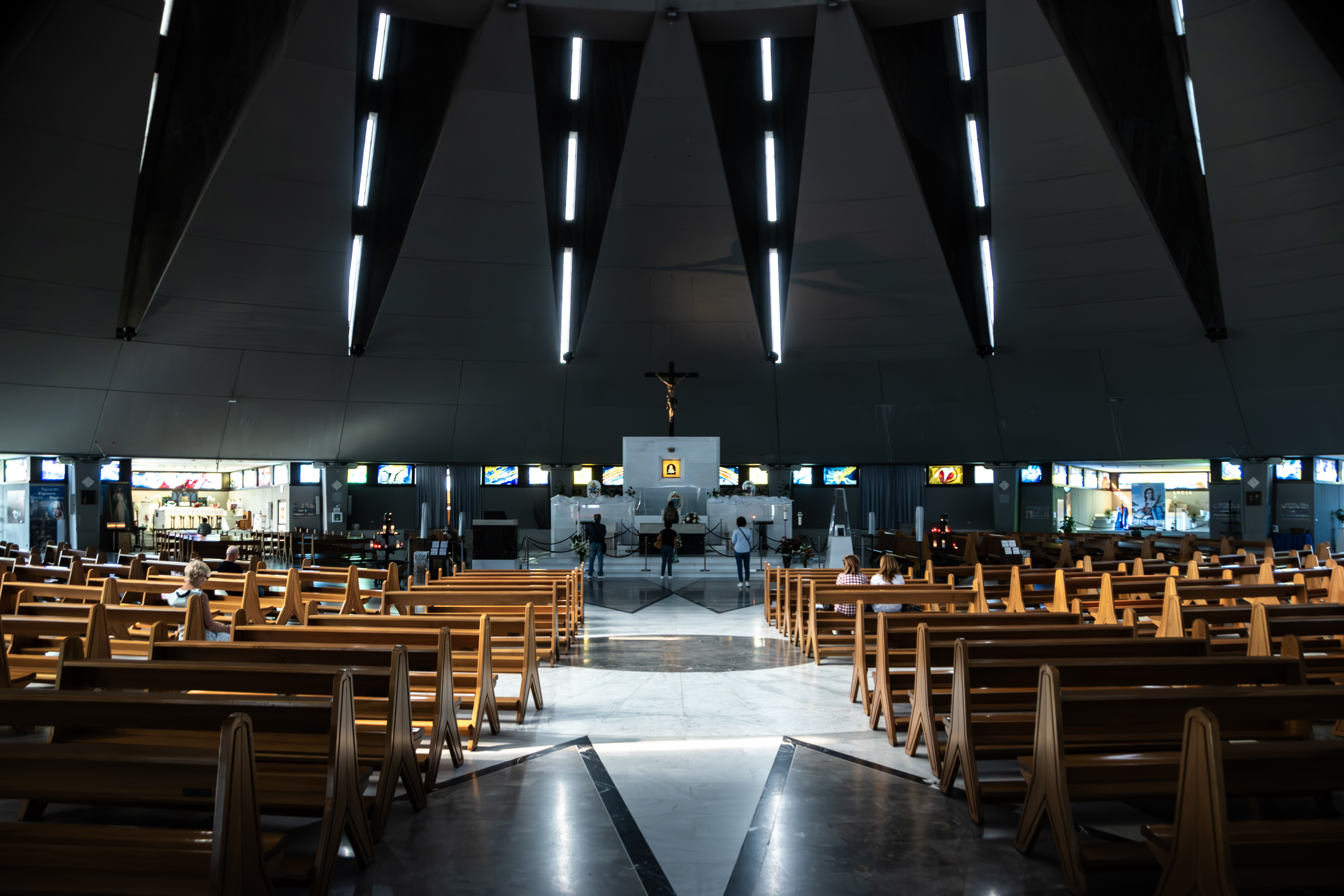
Interior

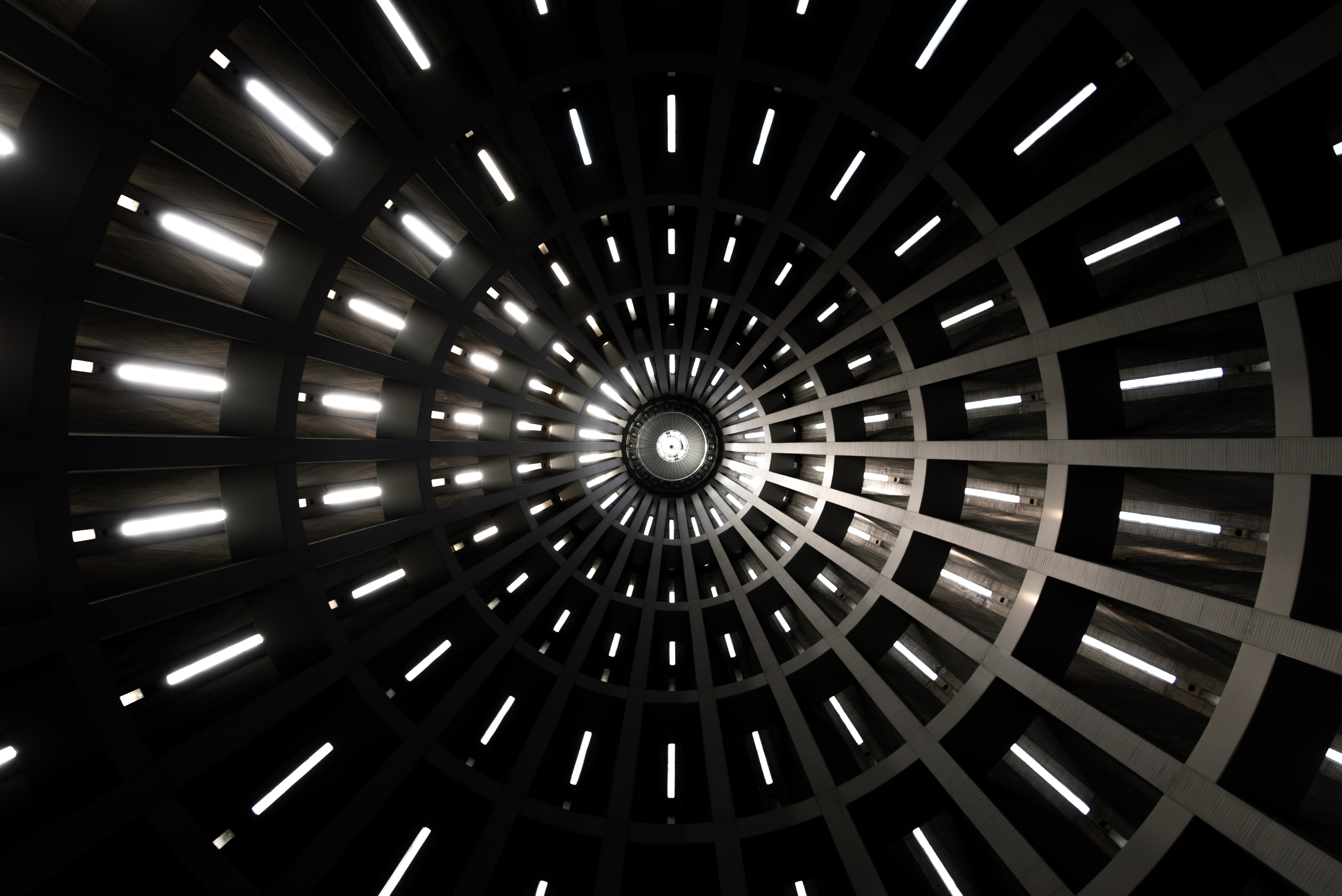
Ceiling, centered

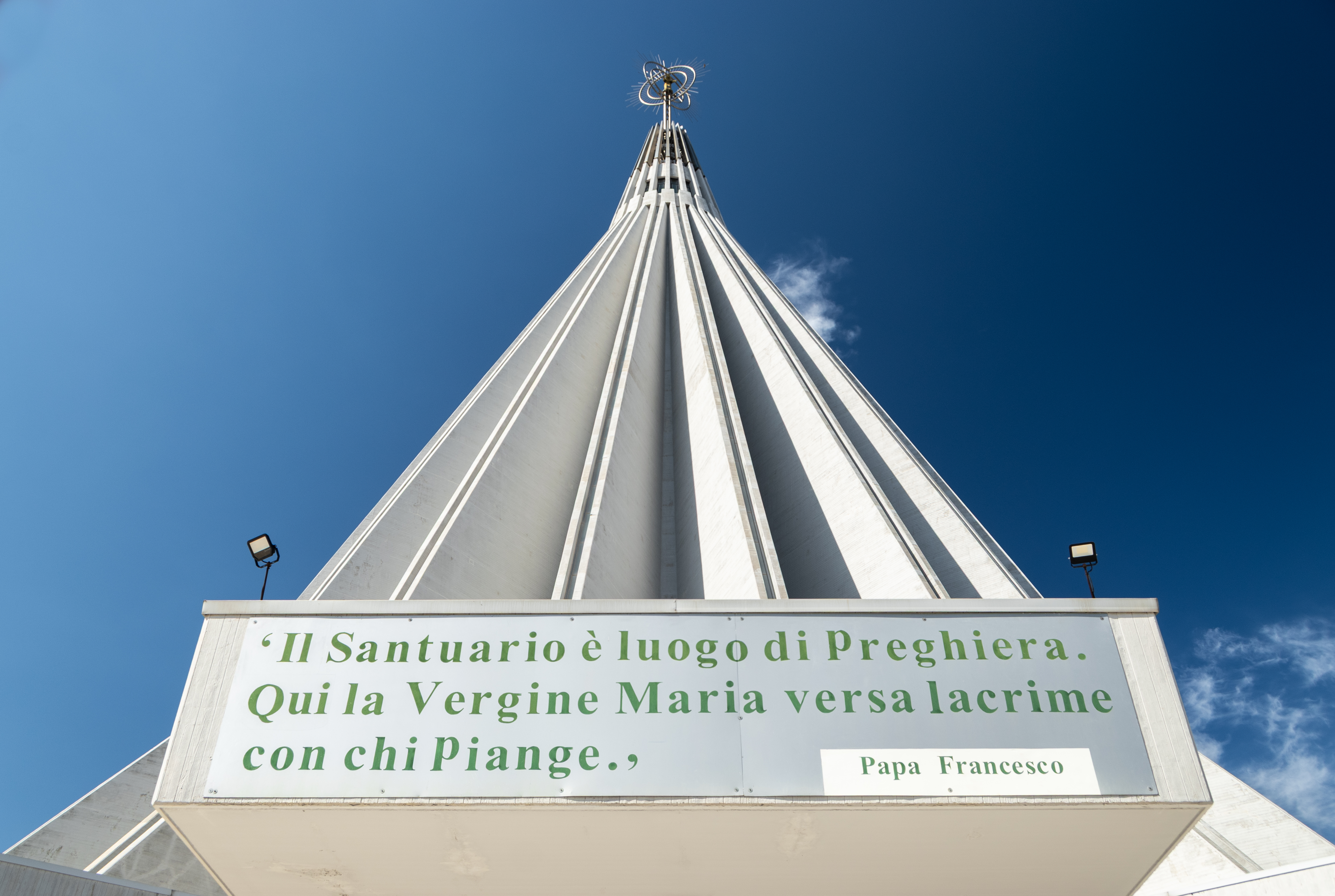
Quote by Pope Francis, printed on the entrance

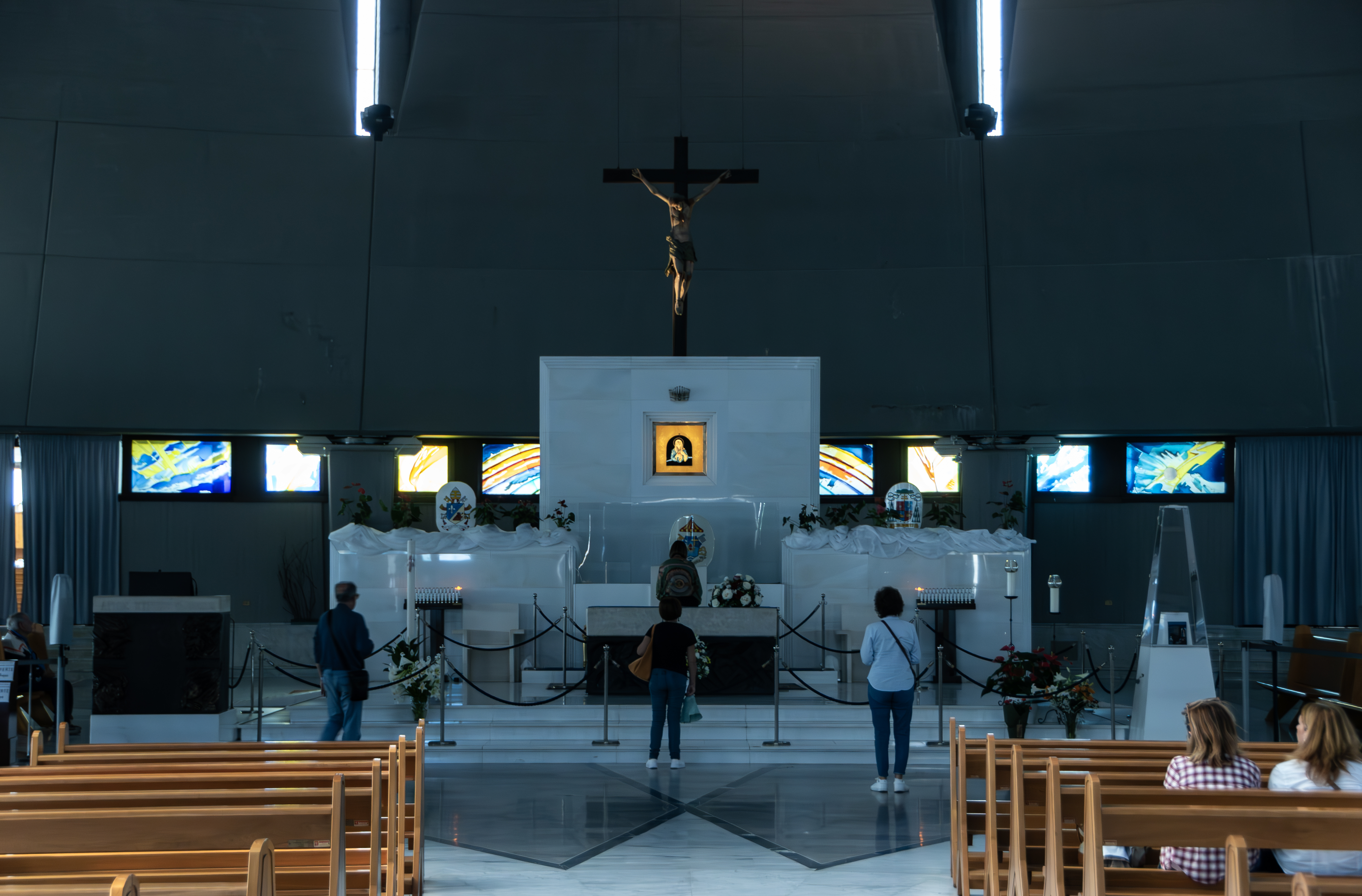
Altar of the basilica

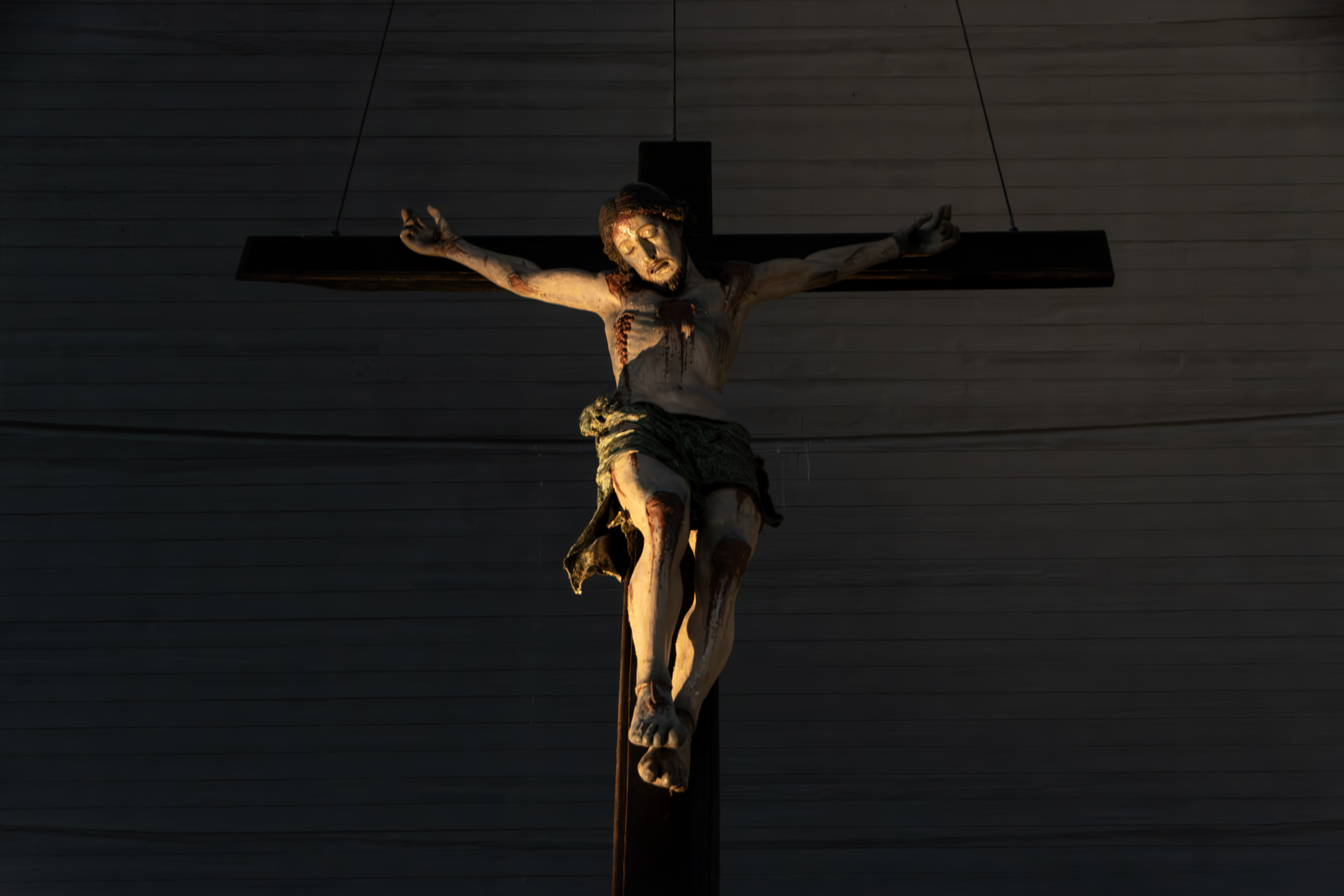
Statue of the Crucifixion of Jesus
