= Bataillon de Joinville =

French military unit

Joinville
- Bataillon de Joinville
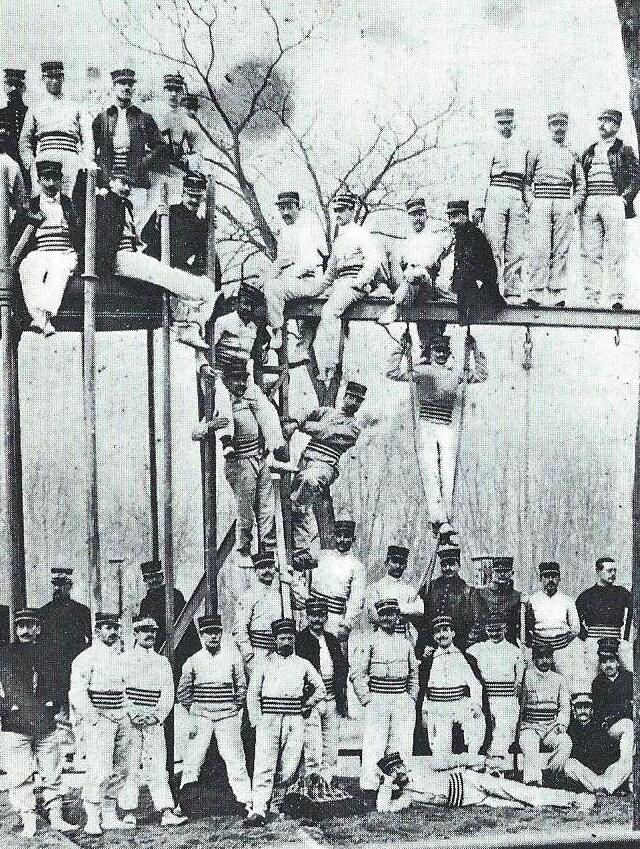
- Students in the school at the end of the 19th century.
- Active: 1852
- Allegiance: French Armed Forces
- Garrison/HQ: Battalion

The Joinville Battalion is a military unit of the French Army that welcomes conscripted athletes. It takes place in the sports training establishments established within the armies since 1852 with the Military Gymnastics Training School of Joinville. The Joinville Battalion was dissolved in June 2002 due to the end of conscription. It was reconstituted in 2014 with 88 high-level athletes under contract with the army, within the National Center for Defense Sports (CNSD). Thus, it brings together a company bringing together the summer disciplines of 22 sports federations within the Joint Sports School, and a company bringing together the winter disciplines within the French military ski team, forming for high-level athletes the "army of champions".

In October 2019, a support protocol for the 2024 Olympic Games in Paris was signed at the National Defense Sports Center in Fontainebleau, thus making it possible to support French sport by recruiting up to 175 high-level defense athletes (SHND).

== The Military Normal School of Gymnastics of Joinville ==
The Military Gymnastics Training School of Joinville opened its doors on 15 July 1852 at the Faisanderie redoubt, a military structure of the Saint-Maur fortifications, on the eastern edge of the Bois de Vincennes and the Plateau de Gravelle. The land was then part of the territory of the commune of Joinville-le-Pont, in the department of Seine (today in Val-de-Marne). The aim of the school was to train military gymnastics instructors, but it soon took advantage of the absence of training systems for school physical education to expand beyond the space specific to the army and get involved in gymnastics in public schools. In 1872, the school became the Joinville Normal School of Gymnastics and Fencing, and it later helped to train French athletes participating in the Olympic Games.

The club closed in 1914 due to the outbreak of the First World War, during which it became the first French physical rehabilitation center. In 1925, it took the name of "higher school of physical education" and published a reference manual called "The French Method", which spread throughout France for almost a century. It then closed again in 1939 due to the outbreak of the Second World War. Its former staff resumed their functions in 1941 in civil and military establishments, such as the national college of instructors and athletes of Antibes, the national sports institute of Paris, the national schools of military physical training of Pau-le-Hameau and Antibes, the army sports center of Pau, the sports center of the armed forces of Joinville, the battalion of Joinville, the joint sports group of Joinville and the joint school of physical training and sports of Joinville.

== The Joinville Battalion ==
In 1945, the National Institute of Sports was created, and three years later, in 1948, the Joinville sports group moved into the premises of the Fort Neuf de Vincennes, near the castle, then into those of the Faisanderie, before being transferred, under the name of the Joinville Inter-Army Sports Group, to the Gravelle Redoubt, liberated in 1955 by the Normal School of Physical Education (ENEP). In 1956, the Joinville Battalion was created for renowned sports conscripts, which included athletes in many disciplines.

On 1 July 1967, the Antibes military physical training school was grouped with the Montauban shooting, Pau parachuting, Bordeaux modern pentathlon, and the Toulon Navy physical training to form the École interarmées des sports. This new entity took over the missions of the Joinville higher school of physical education. With the suspension of compulsory national military service, the Joinville Battalion disappeared in June 2002. In total, the Joinville battalion welcomed 21,000 high-level athletes.

== The Army of Champions ==
The Battalion was reintroduced and reappeared in 2014 with 88 high-level athletes. It quickly took on the nickname of “Army of Champions”.

This school has two companies, one of the same name, which brings together the summer disciplines attached to 22 federations, and the French military ski team, attached to the French Ski Federation, for the winter disciplines.

== Notable athletes ==
- José Amet
- Jacques Anquetil
- Xavier Blond
- Maxime Bossis
- Pierre Barthès
- Moussa Bezaz
- Youri Djorkaeff
- Raymond Dot
- Georges Dransart
- Just Fontaine
- Dominique Gaigne
- Jean Galfione
- Maurice Genevoix
- Jean-François Gourdon
- Jacques Grattarola
- Nicolas Hénard
- Yves Herbet
- Olivier Jacque
- Henri Leconte
- Patrice Loko
- Bixente Lizarazu
- Yvon Madiot
- Raymond Mastrotto
- Félix Mathey
- Frédéric Mendy
- Francis Moreau
- Alain Mosconi
- Jean-Michel Moutier
- Pierre Neubert
- Yannick Noah
- Éric Pécout
- Emmanuel Petit
- René Pingeon
- Michel Platini
- Yvon Pouliquen
- Philippe Riboud
- Jackson Richardson
- Olivier Rouyer
- Omar Sahnoun
- Éric Sikora
- Francis Smerecki
- Christine Sterbik
- Georges Turlier
- Richard Virenque
- Zinedine Zidane
- Laurent Fignon
- Alain Gallopin
- Dominique Gallo
- Jean-Claude Brondani
- Martin Fourcade
- Cyrian Ravet

== Notable sections ==
=== Handball ===
- Championnat de France (1): 1961

== The "Joinville salute" ==
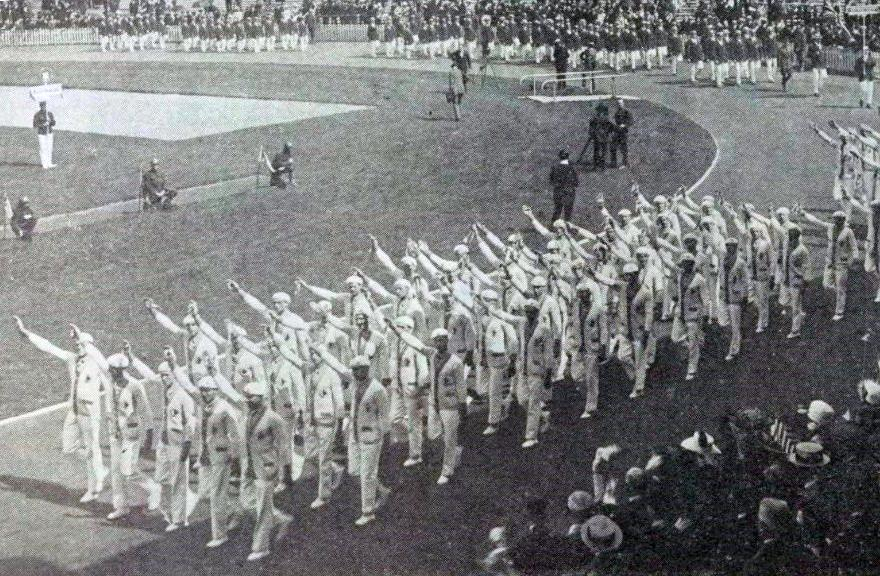
The French delegation at the opening of the 1920 Olympic Games

Since the 1920 Olympic Games in Antwerp, Belgium, the Olympic salute has been part of the ritual. It is performed with the right arm bent and then extended to the side. It is also called the "Joinville salute". At the 1936 Summer Olympics at the Berlin Stadium, when the French delegation, led by discus thrower Jules Noël paraded in front of the official stand, with 201 athletes giving the Olympic salute, the Berlin stadium erupted in delirious ovations, the gesture of the French being taken for the Hitler salute. On 3 September 1946, the executive board of the International Olympic Committee (IOC), at the request of Mr. Poplimont of the Belgian Olympic Committee, decided that the Olympic salute, during the opening events of the Games, is changed "in order to avoid any confusion with other salutes of sad memory".
