= Saint-Seurin-sur-l'Isle =

- Commune
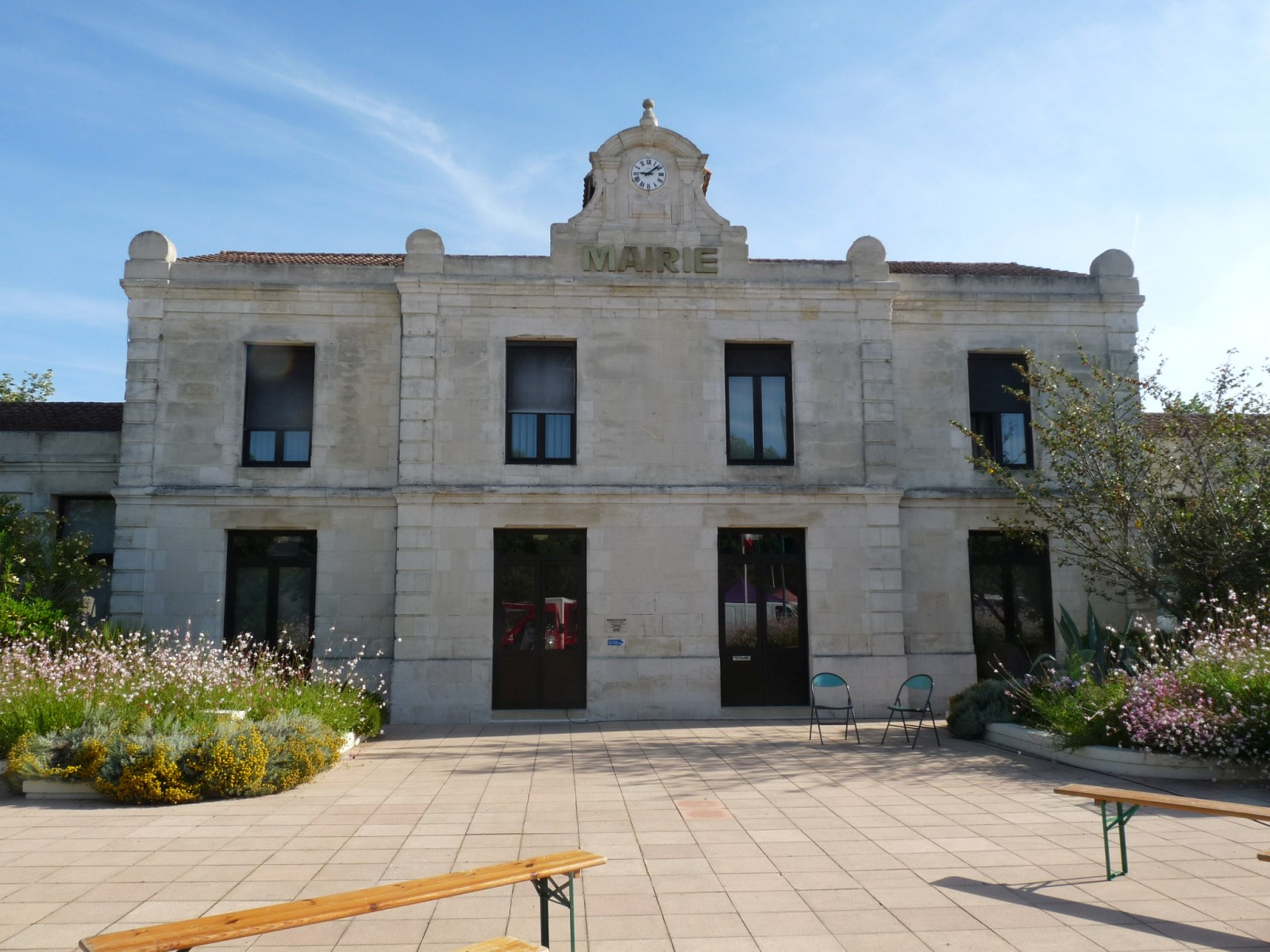
- The town hall in Saint-Seurin-sur-l'Isle
- Location of Saint-Seurin-sur-l'Isle
- Location within France Location within Nouvelle-Aquitaine
- Coordinates: 45°00′54″N 0°00′02″W
- Country: France
- Region: Nouvelle-Aquitaine
- Department: Gironde
- Arrondissement: Libourne
- Canton: Le Nord-Libournais
- Intercommunality: CA Libournais

Government
  - Mayor (2020–2026): Éveline Lavaure-Cardona
- Area^{1}: 8.83 km^{2} (3.41 sq mi)
- Elevation: 22 m (72 ft)
- Highest elevation: 75 m (246 ft)
- Lowest elevation: 12 m (39 ft)
- Population (2023): 3,167
  - Density: 359/km^{2} (929/sq mi)
- Time zone: UTC+01:00 (CET)
  - Summer (DST): UTC+02:00 (CEST)
- INSEE/Postal code: 33478 /33660
- ^{1} French Land Register data, which excludes lakes, ponds, glaciers > 1 km^{2} (0.386 sq mi or 247 acres) and river estuaries.

Saint-Seurin-sur-l'Isle (French pronunciation: [sɛ̃ sœʁɛ̃ syʁ lil], literally Saint Seurin on the Isle; Occitan: Sant Seurin sus l'Eila) is a commune in the Gironde department in Nouvelle-Aquitaine in southwestern France. Saint-Seurin-sur-l'Isle station has rail connections to Bordeaux, Périgueux, Brive-la-Gaillarde and Limoges.

== Mayors ==
Marcel Berthomé was mayor from 1971 to 2020. From 2014 to 2020 he was the oldest mayor in France.

== Population ==
Historical population
Year	Pop.	±% p.a.
1968	1,738	—
1975	2,046	+2.36%
1982	2,424	+2.45%
1990	2,491	+0.34%
1999	2,376	−0.52%
2007	2,739	+1.79%
2012	3,061	+2.25%
2017	3,155	+0.61%
2023	3,167	+0.06%
Source: INSEE

== See also ==
- Communes of the Gironde department
