= Operation Wuambushu =

2023 and 2024-present French military operation

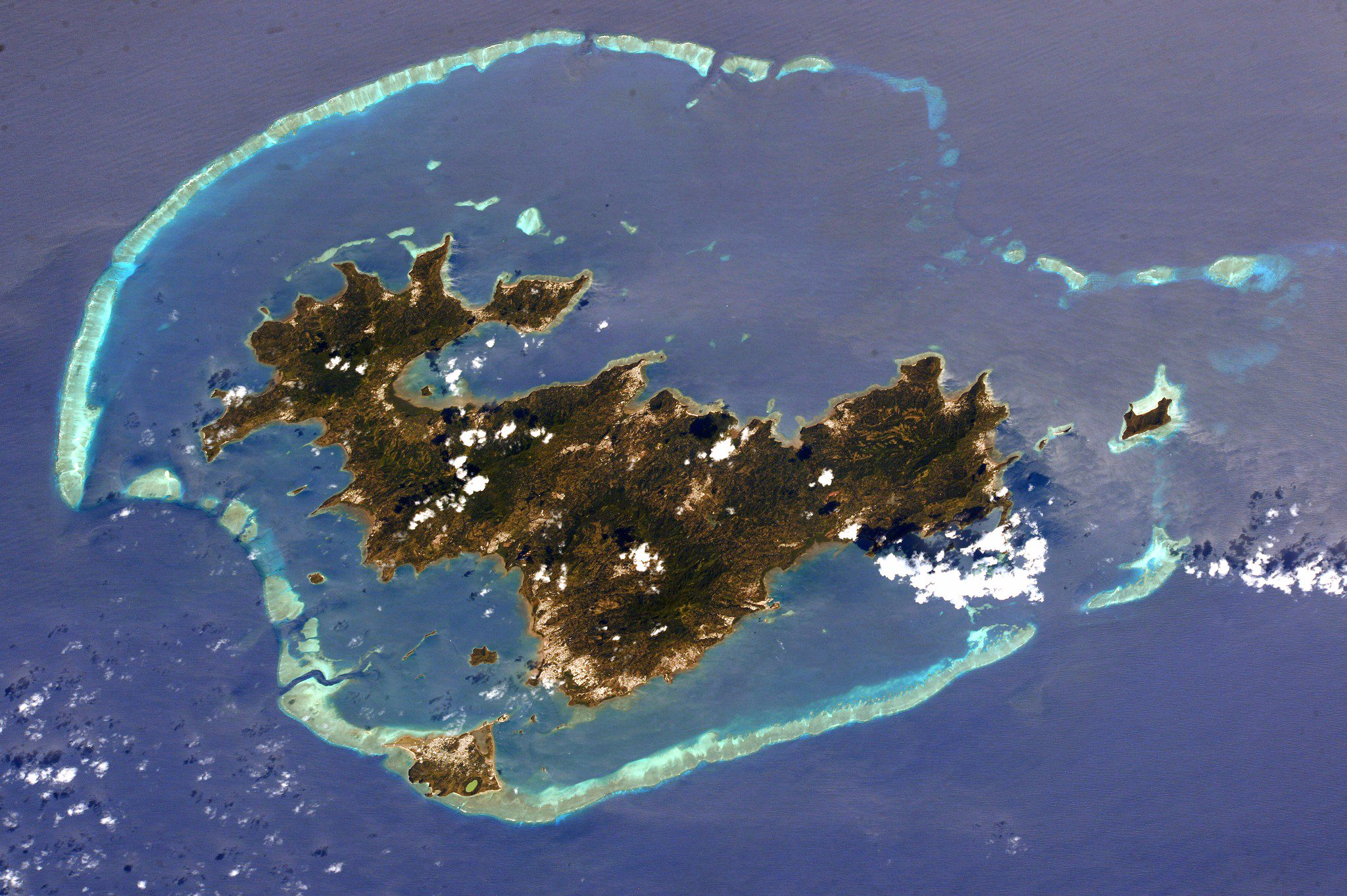
- Mayotte from the International Space Station
- Type: Law enforcement

Participants
- Planned by: Borne government
- Executed by: CRS; ERIS; National Gendarmerie; French Police; RAID; Sea Gendarmerie; GIGN; Air Gendarmerie; Border Police; Republican Guard
- Countries participating: France; Comoros (partial support in evacuation)

Mission
- Target: Illegal immigrants and organised crime
- Objective: Expelling illegal immigrants, destroying slums, and fighting crime on the Mayotte islands

Timeline
- Date begin: 24 April 2023 (first operation); 16 April 2024 (second operation)
- Date end: 11 September 2023 (first operation); Ongoing (second operation)

Results
- Arrests: 1327 arrested (55 gang leaders)
- Miscellaneous results: 400 illegal housing units destroyed 10% reduction in crime rate

Operation Wuambushu ("recovery" in Shimaore) is an ongoing French military-police operation in Mayotte, aimed at expelling illegal immigrants, destroying slums, and fighting crime on the islands.

The operation was revealed on February 22, 2023, by the satirical weekly Le Canard enchaîné, and its launch was confirmed by the Minister of the Interior, Gérald Darmanin, on April 20, 2023, during an interview with Le Figaro.

== Background ==
=== Illegal immigration in Mayotte ===
The State Secretariat for Overseas Territories estimated in 2007 that of the 180,000 inhabitants, nearly a third were illegal immigrants. In 2022, according to INSEE, the population reached 300,000 inhabitants half of whom were foreigners. People without a residence permit represent 30% of the population on the island.

For several years the French government has been occupied with the migratory situation in Mayotte. Since 2019, it has increased its means of opposing unauthorized immigration on the island, in particular through the continuous sea presence of interceptor boats and through aerial surveillance. Already in 2021, the French treatment of the situation in Mayotte has been accused with multiple violations of human rights.

Visiting Mayotte in December 2022, the Minister of the Interior, Gérald Darmanin, once again expressed his desire to strengthen the fight.

=== Crime in Mayotte ===
Mayotte is faced with "extraordinary delinquency", as indicated by INSEE in 2021, noting in particular a three times higher rate of theft and use of violence or threats than in France. In 2018 or 2019, 18% of households reported having been victims of a burglary or theft without a break-in, four times more than in mainland France. One in ten people report having experienced physical violence in the last two years. In 2021, a 14-year-old teenager was found murdered on Petite-Terre and a 15-year-old teenager was stabbed to death by a gang. In November 2022, a school bus trapped in a violent ambush made headlines all over France, particularly in mainland France followed by a visit by Gérald Darmanin to Mayotte, a visit during which he promised "spectacular actions".

== Objectives ==
Approved in February by the President of the French Republic, Emmanuel Macron and orchestrated by Gérald Darmanin, Minister of the Interior and Overseas Territories, this large-scale operation aims to dislodge a majority of irregular migrants from neighboring Comoros, and to demolish many sheet metal huts exposed to natural hazards.

== Forces ==
As part of the operation, 119 police reinforcements were deployed on the island, among them 71 police officers from mainland France, 3 police officers from Réunion and 45 CRS. Since April 17, 2023, 164 CRS arrived in the territory.

A total of 1,800 police and gendarmes were mobilized for the military operation, which Minister of the Interior, Gérald Darmanin stated as "an unprecedented device in the history of the Republic".

The CRS 8 of Bièvres which was created in 2021 and is specialized in urban violence was also deployed.

Several armored vehicles from the National Gendarmerie were also deployed.

== Timeline ==
=== April ===
==== 24 April ====
The operation began in the morning of April 24, 2023 by identity checks on different roads. Clashes between law enforcement forces and a hundred attackers armed with machetes occurred in the commune of Mamoudzou. Some police officers used weaponry to free themselves from the attackers. The police were also called upon during the day to remove a roadblock made up of tree logs in Tsingoni, located on the west coast of Mayotte.

The operation in Mamoudzou in the village of Tsoundzou resulted in the arrest of twelve attackers and a wounding of 19 police officers. Moreover, a passenger in a vehicle was injured by the attackers.

The boat Maria Galanta, carrying several travelers and illegal immigrants, reached the Comorian island of Andjuan was turned back by the Comorian authorities as the commander of the port of Mutsamudu invoked a closure of the port "for works" Thierry Suquet instructed the prefect of Mayotte “to take note of this decision”, and hoped thereafter to resume rotations.

Around 10 p.m., in Bouéni around ten attackers equipped with melee weapons attacked private vehicles, injuring a female driver. The gendarmes arrested three attackers.

On the night of April 24 to 25, the Kawéni fire station, near Mamoudzou, was attacked by around fifteen individuals, causing heavy damage. The intervention of the police resulted in the arrest of a person.

==== 25 April ====
The Mamoudzou judicial court suspended the evacuation of a shantytown called “Talus 2” and located in Koungou, near Mamoudzou, initially planned for April 25 at 6 a.m. In its decision, the court deemed it unsuitable and stated that "the demolition of homes neighboring those of the applicants will weaken them, will not be without effect on their stability, and will have a certain impact on their security” The prefect of Mayotte, Thierry Suquet, indicated that he plans to appeal against the decision.

The Minister of the Interior Gérald Darmanin, stated that “the action carried out in Mayotte is the restoration of republican peace”.

Clashes broke out during the day until late at night, between the police and gangs, who blocked the main axis of the commune of Koungou, using improvised barricades. Several scenes of burglaries, looting and racketeering are reported. A helicopter and several armored vehicles were mobilized and then the gendarmes were able to arrest a person armed with a machete. Clashes were also reported in Ouangani in the village of Kahani.

The collective of women leaders criticizes the mayor of Dembeni for not supporting Operation Wuambushu and demonstrates in front of the town hall, where the mayor had taken refuge.

During the night, a man was arrested by the police trying to sabotage a gas station in Mamoudzou.

==== 26 April ====
Under pressure from different groups, the mayors of Dembeni, Mtsamboro, Bouéni and M'Tsangamouji announced their support for the operation.

On the morning of April 26, the gendarmes supported by the intervention platoon of the Republican Guard arrested two attackers involved in the events of the day before.

A Comorian group called Le Patriot demands the departure of all French people living in the Comoros and threatened to "slaughter French residents in the Union of the Comoros like sheep" in reaction to Operation Wuambushu.

The commander of the port of Mutsamudu located on the Comorian island of Anjouan announced the reopening of the port. The shipping company SGTM, which operates rotations between Mayotte and Anjouan, announced that it will resume its activities on April 28.

On the evening of April 26, the Defender of Rights, Claire Hédon, said that she was “particularly attentive to the unconditional respect of the fundamental rights of people” within the framework of the Wuambushu security operation carried out in Mayotte, and announced the sending of a delegation of lawyers to the island and also stated that “the need to guarantee public order and security cannot, under any circumstances, authorize attacks on the rights and fundamental freedoms of individuals.”

The Assembly of the Union of the Comoros unanimously adopted a resolution condemning Operation Wuambushu.

At around 10:30 p.m., clashes broke out between the police and gangs, several buildings and vehicles were burned in Mamoudzou in the Doujani district. The gendarmes managed to arrest two individuals. A police officer was attacked and fired his weapon, injuring two attackers.

==== 27 April ====
Peace was restored in Doujani in the morning after nearly ten hours of clashes. Nine police officers were injured in the clashes.

In the morning, the prefect of Mayotte, Thierry Suquet, went to the village of Longoni, where the destruction of a “small shanty town” had taken place, to allow the construction of a high school .

At the call of a collective of female leaders, a large demonstration with nearly 1,000 participants took place in Chirongui, in support of Operation Wuambushu.

The director of the Comorian port of Anjouan announces that “only passengers who have their national identity card will disembark tomorrow”. Even though many illegal Comorians in Mayotte voluntarily get rid of their identity cards, to avoid expulsion or pass themselves off as minors.

The elected officials of Mayotte ask the government to establish a state of emergency in Mayotte in the face of an unsustainable situation .

==== 28 April ====
Clashes took place between the police and a gang who attacked motorists and started fires in the town of Bandrélé . At least two civilians are injured. These clashes took place even though the mayor of Bandrélé had just announced his support for Operation Wuambushu . In the morning, the gendarmerie arrested three people suspected of having participated in violence at the beginning of the week in Bandrélé, in the village of Hamouro.

The police arrested an individual suspected of being one of the leaders of the attackers during the clashes of April 24, 2023 in Mamoudzou.

=== May ===
==== 5 May ====
In the commune of Koungou, four gendarmes were wounded when they were attacked by several dozen attackers, some disguised as women, armed with machetes and stones. The gendarmerie mobilized 70 men, two armored vehicles and a helicopter to secure the area.

==== 8 May ====
On May 8, the day after the start of the school year in Mayotte, several school stone attacks took place: first in Dembeni, then in Chiconi where an agent was wounded.

==== 11 May ====
On May 11, several Mahorais collectives had blocked access to various health centers, where a large illegal migrant population comes to seek treatment

==== 12 May ====
On May 12, the peripheral hospital of Dzoumogné was attacked by around fifteen individuals dressed in white coats, armed with machetes and iron bars, to do battle with the collectives blocking access to care. At least two collective members were injured.

==== 21 May ====
On May 21, clashes broke out between two gangs in the commune of Tsingoni in which a young man was stabbed in the throat and his lung was punctured.

==== 22 May ====
The French authorities are demolishing the vast Talus 2 shanty town. Madi Abdallah Abdou, a worker from the company responsible for the destruction of the neighborhood, felt unwell and was taken to hospital.

==== 23 May ====
On May 23, following the announcement by Jean-François Carenco (Minister Delegate for Overseas Territories) that “Operation Wuambushu could end within two or three months with a return to mainland police and gendarmes dispatched," several elected officials from Mahor expressed in a column in Le Monde their concern about this "admission of helplessness and an unforgivable abandonment of Mayotte," adding "We cannot accept this shameful outcome, this waste".

==== 24 May ====
On May 24, Madi Abdallah Abdou died in hospital.

=== June ===
==== 9 June ====
On June 9, the administrative justice system in Mayotte rejected the appeal filed by a family from the Barakani neighborhood in Koungou who opposed the evacuation and destruction of the shantytown where they live.

==== 25 June ====
The Minister of the Interior announced on June 25 the extension of the operation.

=== September ===
==== 11 September ====
On September 11, 2023, Gérald Darmanin announced the end of the operation and the destruction of 400 housing units in the slums (out of an initial objective of 1,000), “1,327 arrests, including almost all of the gang leaders who had been identified (55 out of 59)” and a reduction in violence against people by 10%. The operation was partially successful but failed to achieve its main objectives.

== Second operation ==
On April 16, 2024, Overseas Minister Marie Guevenoux announced the start of an operation “Wuambushu 2”, with the objective once again of “fighting unsanitary housing, illegal immigration and finding gang leaders ", this time with a goal of arresting "60 gang leaders who were targeted" and destroying "1,300 bangas, twice as many as last year."

== Reactions ==
=== In favor ===
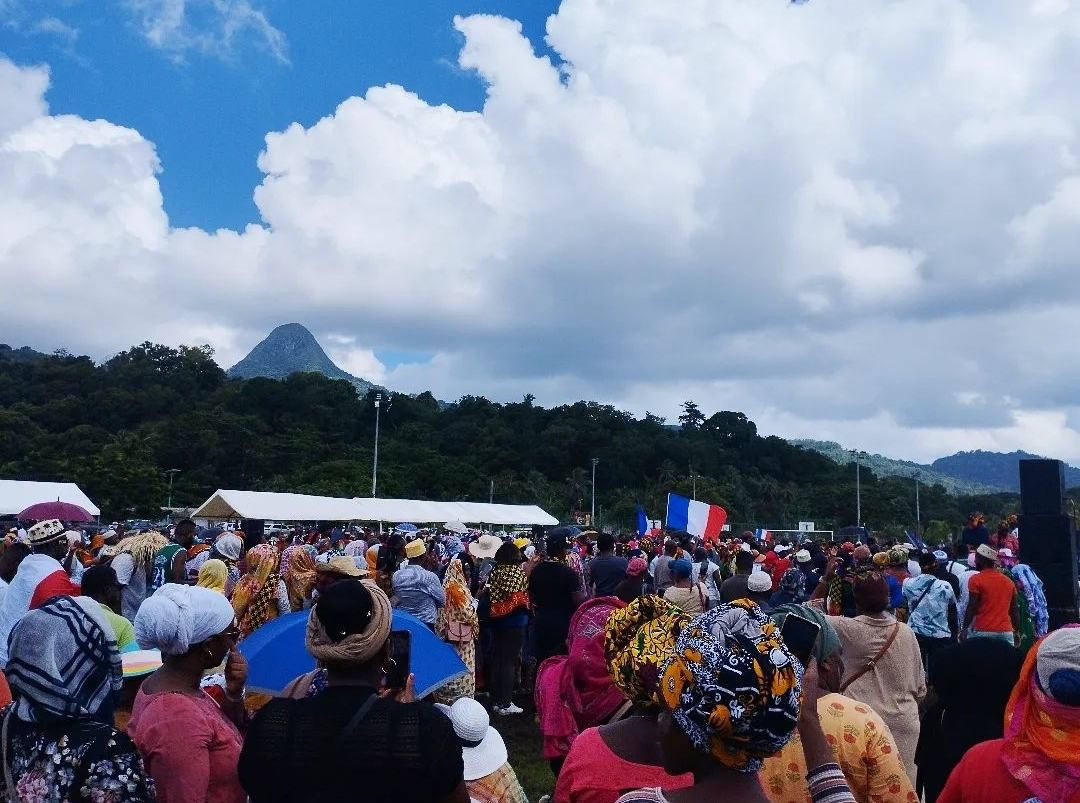
Demonstrations in support of the operation on 27 April 2023.

Several Mayotte collectives aimed at expelling migrants from the island support the Wuambushu operation, in particular the Collective of citizens of Mayotte law 1901, the Collective of citizens of Mayotte movement 2018, the Réma collective, the Women Leaders and the Codim. The latter wrote to the Minister of the Interior asking for the continuation of the operation.

At the political level, the operation is supported by the two deputies from Mayotte Estelle Youssouffa and Mansour Kamardine.

The National Rally denounced a “communication coup serving the interests of Gérald Darmanin” but supported the operation.

On April 24, 2023, on the plateau of Mayotte La Première, the vice-president of the departmental council of Mayotte, Salime Mdéré, created controversy by declaring with regard to the illegal delinquents present on the island "that we should perhaps kill some," calling them "terrorists." for which he received widespread condemnation from several political and activist groups.

Madi Madi Souf, mayor of Pamandzi and president of the Association of Mayors of Mayotte, declared his “total support for the operation to reconquer our territory."

=== Mixed ===
Mikidadi Abdullah, spokesperson for La France Insoumise in Mayotte, distances himself from the position of the LFI-NUPES parliamentary group, firmly opposed to the operation. On Mayotte La Première, the Mahorais declares that he cannot “be for or against” and questions the border policy consistent with the operation: "are we going to close the borders? If the Kwassas come back, what's the point of Wuambushu?"

=== Against ===
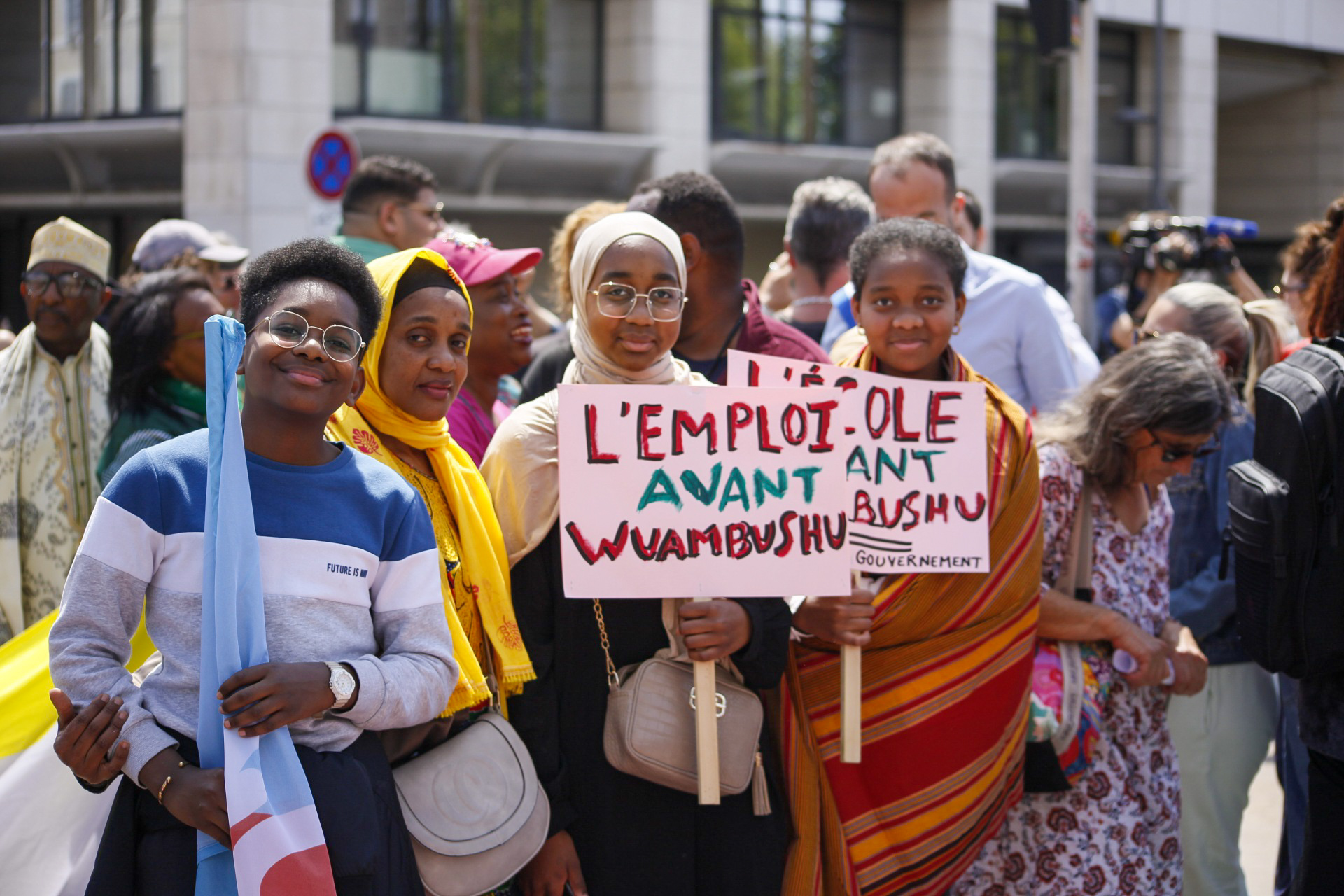
Demonstrations against the Operation in April 2023

In a forum, 170 health personnel on the island recalled "the dramatic consequences" of previous large-scale interventions in the fight against immigration, referring in particular to the "generation of situations at risk of epidemic infection," the "limitation of access to care" or even "delays in treatment" for certain pathologies that they would have caused.

On April 5, Comorian civil society organizations held a press conference to warn of a "massacre to come."

The president of the National Consultative Commission on Human Rights (CNCDH), Jean-Marie Burguburu, wrote to Gérald Darmanin, urging him to "give up" on this project, considering the risk of "worsening fractures and tensions in an already very fragile context…and the violation of respect for the fundamental rights of foreigners in the context of mass expulsions."

The association supporting exiles in France, Utopia 56, spoke of a "raid of an unprecedented scale in order to saturate justice and thus circumvent the rule of law to deport with a vengeance…the beginnings of 'a filthy communication operation.'"

The President of the Comoros, Azali Assoumani asked the French government to abandon the operation.

UNICEF was concerned "about the impact that this large-scale operation is likely to have on the realization of the rights of the most vulnerable children present on the territory, in particular foreign minors and minors in conflict with the law."

The LFI-NUPES parliamentary group opposed Operation Wuambushu, and stated in a press release that, “attacking migrants, the precarious and the vulnerable as the government does is inhumane, cruel and the sign of a great political weakness.” The group accused the government of "sticking to the themes of the right and the extreme right.”

The vice-president of the Human Rights League, Marie-Christine Vergiat, declares: “It is an aberrant situation and, here too, we want to resolve the situation of social misery through repression and by designating foreigners as scapegoats. It’s perfect to explain the metropolis’s non-investment in this forgotten territory of the Republic.”
