= Jean Laurent (banker) =

French banker and businessman (1944–2023)

- Born: 31 July 1944; Mazamet, German-occupied France
- Died: 12 January 2023 (aged 78)
- Education: Institut supérieur de l'aéronautique et de l'espace Wichita State University
- Occupations: Banker; Businessman

Jean Laurent (31 July 1944 – 12 January 2023) was a French banker and businessman.

== Biography ==
Born in Mazamet on 31 July 1944, Laurent earned a degree in engineering from the Institut supérieur de l'aéronautique et de l'espace in 1967. He then earned a master's degree from Wichita State University and began a long career with Crédit Agricole. He first worked in Toulouse before moving to Loiret and Île-de-France, where he was a supervisor. He then joined the corporate office of Crédit Agricole, serving as deputy managing director from 1993 to 1999 and managing director from 1999 to 2005. In this position, he oversaw the initial public offering of Crédit Agricole SA in 2001 and the acquisition of Crédit Lyonnais in 2003. He was chairman of the board of directors of Covivio from 2010 to 2022.

Laurent died on 12 January 2023, at the age of 78.
