= Roland Weller =

French businessman (1938–2023)

President of RC Strasbourg Alsace
- In office 1994–1997
- Preceded by: Jean Wendling
- Succeeded by: Patrick Proisy

Personal details
- Born: 11 September 1938 Strasbourg, France
- Died: 23 January 2023 (aged 84)
- Occupation: Businessman

Roland Weller (11 September 1938 – 23 January 2023) was a French businessman. In addition to his businesses he served as President of RC Strasbourg Alsace football club from 1994 to 1997.

== Biography ==
Born in Strasbourg on 11 September 1938, Weller first worked as a chef, founding the company Alsacienne de restauration in 1978. He became president of SC Schiltigheim, then of RC Strasbourg Alsace in 1994. In 1997, the city decided to sell its shares in the club and it was sold to IMG. He left his post as president in June 1997. However, he remained popular among sports fans in Strasbourg following his tenure.

Weller died on 23 January 2023, at the age of 84.
