= Noël Coulet =

French academic and historian (1932–2023)

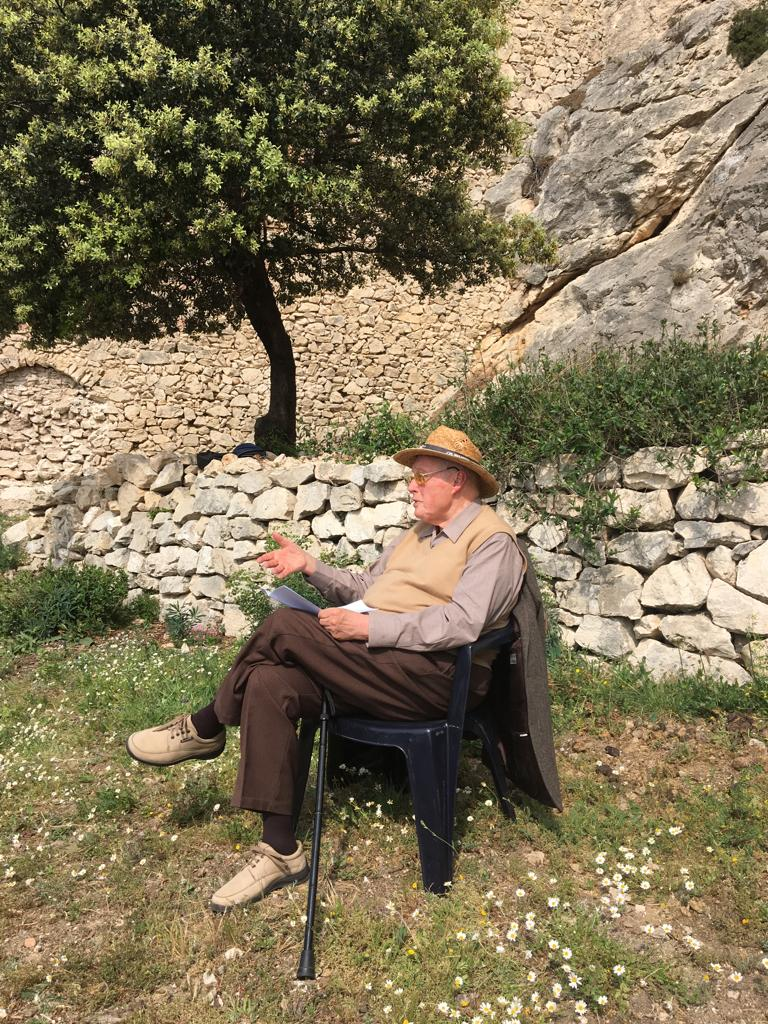
- Born: 4 October 1932
- Died: 15 January 2023 (aged 90); Aix-en-Provence, France
- Education: Lycée Thiers
- Occupations: Professor; Historian

Noël Coulet (4 October 1932 – 15 January 2023) was a French academic and medieval historian.

== Biography ==
Born on 4 October 1932, Coulet took preporatory classes at the Lycée Thiers, where he was notably taught by Henri Coulet and Marc Soriano. During his doctoral studies, he was a student of Georges Duby. After his thesis titled Aix-en-Provence, espace et relations d'une capitale, mi-XIVe - mi-XVe s., he researched Provence during the 14th and 15th Centuries and particularly focused on religious history. He was a professor emeritus of medieval history at the University of Provence.

Coulet died in Aix-en-Provence on 15 January 2023, at the age of 90.

== Publications ==
- Ten articles published in Les Cahiers de Fangeaux
- "Les jeux de la Fête Dieu d'Aix, une fête médiévale ?" (1981)
- Les Templiers de Bayle au xiie siècle : un document inédit" (2004)
- Histoire de la Provence (with Maurice Agulhon)
- La Provence au Moyen Âge (with Martin Aurell and Jean-Paul Boyer, 2005)
- Histoire d'Aix-en-Provence (with Florian Mazel, 2020)
