= Claude Guillon =

French writer and philosopher (1952–2023)

- Born: 17 September 1952; Paris, France
- Died: 19 January 2023 (aged 70)
- Occupations: Writer; Philosopher

Claude Guillon (17 September 1952 – 19 January 2023) was a French writer and philosopher. A libertarian communist, he advocated for situationist opinions. He gained notoriety in 1982 with the book Suicide, mode d'emploi, which sold over 100,000 copies before being banned.

== Biography ==
Guillon was born in Paris on 17 September 1952 to an upper-middle-class family. His parents were dental surgeons in the public sector and his grandfather, also named Claude, was a deputy of the National Assembly from 1928 to 1932. He studied at the Lycée de Meudon and graduated in 1970. He was a member of the Revolutionary Anarchist Organization in a small chapter in Meudon. A conscientious objector, he refused his conscription, both military and civil.

In 1977, he became a freelance objector for Libération and was an activist within the "sexual revolution" within the French movement for family planning. In 1982, he published Suicide, mode d'emploi.

From 1990 to 1994, Guillon was an editor of the magazine Mordicus alongside Serge Quadruppani. On 28 August 1996, he was the victim of police violence during a demonstration against the expulsion of undocumented immigrants from Saint-Bernard de la Chapelle. The following month, he appeared in court for his actions during the protest.

The year after Guillon's book was published, the Senate adopted a bill against "incitement to suicide", which was passed by the National Assembly in 1987. The book was mentioned in debates in the National Assembly as an example of what the law intended to prohibit. In 1991, the book was officially banned in France. In 1997, he published À la vie, à la mort - Maîtrise de la douleur et droit à la mort, which discussed the denial of pain in children.

Guillon died on 19 January 2023, at the age of 70.

== Publications ==
- Pour en finir avec Reich (1978)
- Ni vieux ni maîtres, guide à l’usage des 10-18 ans (1979)
- Suicide, mode d’emploi, Histoire, technique, actualité (1982)
- De la révolution : 1989 l'inventaire des rêves et des armes (1988)
- Deux enragés de la Révolution : Leclerc de Lyon et Pauline Léon (1993)
- Gare au TGV ! (1993)
- 42 bonnes raisons pour les femmes de m’éviter (1993)
- Le Spectacle du Monde (1996)
- À la vie à la mort, maîtrise de la douleur et droit à la mort (1997)
- Économie de la misère (1999)
- Le Siège de l’âme, éloge de la sodomie (1999)
- Dommages de guerre (Paris-Pristina-Belgrade-1999) (2000)
- Pièces à conviction. Textes libertaires 1970-2000 (2001)
- Le Droit à la mort, "Suicide, mode d’emploi", ses lecteurs et ses juges (2004)
- Je chante le corps critique (2008)
- Notre patience est à bout, 1792-1793, les écrits des Enragé(e)s (2009)
- La Terrorisation démocratique (2009)
- Comment peut-on être anarchiste ? (2015)
- Abécédaire de la sodomie (2019)

=== Texts ===
- La parole à... Joseph Déjacque (2013)
