= Michel Laurencin =

French academic and historian (1944–2023)

- Born: 20 October 1944; Langeais, France
- Died: 8 January 2023 (aged 78)
- Occupations: Professor; Historian

Michel Laurencin (20 October 1944 – 8 January 2023) was a French academic and historian who specialized in the history of Touraine.

== Biography ==
After earning an agrégation and a doctorate in literature, Laurencin became a teacher at the Lycée d'Amboise before moving to the Lycée Balzac in 1972. In 1975, he became a professor at Cairo University, at the Institut français du Royaume-Uni in 1978, the Prytanée national militaire in 1984, and the Lycée Descartes in 1996.

Michel Laurencin was a member of the High Council of French Citizens Abroad and of the Société archéologique de Touraine. He was also a titular member of and an archivist for the Académie des sciences, arts et belles-lettres de Touraine.

Michel Laurencin died on 8 January 2023, at the age of 78.

== Publications ==
- "L'aqueduc gallo-romain de Luynes et l'antique cité de Malliacum (Indre-et-Loire)" (1967)
- La vie quotidienne en Touraine au temps de Balzac (1981)
- Dictionnaire biographique de Touraine (1990)
- "Le couvent de Jésus-Maria et les Minimes du Plessis-lès-Tours depuis la fin du XVe siècle" (1995)
- En Touraine à l'aube du XXe siècle : un enfant du Véron, Gilbert Plouzeau (1900-1975) (2002)
- Le Lycée Descartes. Histoire d'un établissement d'enseignement à Tours, 1807-2007 : édition du bicentenaire

== Distinctions ==
- Knight of the Legion of Honour
- Knight of the Ordre national du Mérite
- Officer of the Ordre des Palmes académiques
- Prix Mottart (1981)
