= Marcelle Engelen Faber =

French resistant (1923–2023)

- Born: Marcelle Engelen; 3 August 1923; Strasbourg, France
- Died: 7 January 2023 (aged 99); Meylan, France
- Occupation: Resistant

Marcelle Engelen Faber (3 August 1923 – 7 January 2023) was a French Resistant. She was known for being the last surviving member of the Équipe Pur Sang, which helped transfer prisoners out of the Gau Baden and into Vichy France during World War II.

== Biography ==
Engelen was born in Strasbourg on 3 August 1923 into a religious family of five children and a father who worked as a jeweler. At a young age, she joined the Guides de France, where she would eventually become a senior guide.

Engelen joined the French Resistance at the age of 17 with the Équipe Pur Sang, made up of six young women from the Guides de France: Engelen, Emmy Weisheimer, Alice and Marie Daul, Lucie Welker, and Lucienne Welschinger. Initially, the group aided Alsatian prisoners of war, providing food, clothing, and mail transportation from the autumn of 1940 to February 1942. The women took shifts each evening at approximately 6:00 or 7:00 at the Église Saint-Jean de Strasbourg, where the password for assistance was "Pierre".

In January 1942, Engelen appeared before the Reich Labour Service and was sent to the occupied zone. In the autumn of 1944, she interrupted her studies to serve in the women's branch of the Free French Forces.

After World War II, Engelen married geologist Jean Faber, with whom she had four children. She did not maintain good relations with the other members of the Équipe Pur Sang due to her escape from arrest. She eventually outlived every other member of the group.

Marcelle Engelen Faber died in Meylan on 7 January 2023 at the age of 99.
