= Jacques Grattarola =

French footballer (1930–2023)

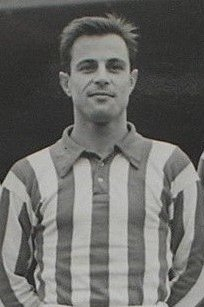
- Grattarola in 1956

Personal information
- Date of birth: 16 February 1930
- Place of birth: Cannes, France
- Date of death: 6 January 2023 (aged 92)
- Place of death: Cannes, France
- Height: 1.72 m (5 ft 8 in)
- Position: Forward

Senior career*
Years	Team	Apps	(Gls)
1948–1952	Cannes	71	(13)
1952–1955	Saint-Étienne	32	(5)
1955–1960	Cannes	157	(12)
Total		260	(30)

International career
1950–1951	France military		
- * Club domestic league appearances and goals

Jacques Grattarola (16 February 1930 – 6 January 2023) was a French footballer who played as a forward.

== Biography ==
Grattarola began his professional career with AS Cannes, for whom he played from 1948 to 1952 and again from 1955 to 1960. From 1952 to 1955, he played for AS Saint-Étienne. In total, he played in 49 matches in Division 1 and 193 matches in Division 2.

In the 1951 World Military Cup, his France military team placed third during his military service at the Bataillon de Joinville.
