= Christelle Doumergue =

French basketball player (1963–2023)

Personal information
- Born: 28 November 1963 Lyon, France
- Died: 24 January 2023 (aged 59)
- Listed height: 1.87 m (6 ft 2 in)

Career information
- Playing career: 1973–2003
- Position: Power forward

Career history
- 1973–1975: Frat Oullins
- 1975–1978: ASVEL
- ?–?: Clermont UC
- ?–?: Tango Bourges Basket
- ?–2003: Stade Clermontois BF

Christelle Doumergue-Le Guiader (28 November 1963 – 24 January 2023) was a French basketball player who played as a power forward.

== Biography ==
She started her career in 1973 with Frat Oullins and joined ASVEL in 1975. She began her senior career with Clermont UC in 1981. She was a winner of the Coupe Joë Jaunay in 1990 and 1991 with Tango Bourges Basket. She retired from professional basketball in 2003 after playing for Stade Clermontois BF.

Doumergue made her debut for the French national team on 27 July 1979 against Yugoslavia and participated in the EuroBasket Women championship in 1980, 1985, 1987, and 1989. Her final national team game was played on 21 July 1989 against Senegal.
