= Michel Andrault =

French architect (1926–2020)

- Born: 17 December 1926; Montrouge, France
- Died: 5 April 2020 (aged 93); Paris, France
- Occupation: Architect

Michel Andrault (17 December 1926 – 5 April 2020) was a French architect.

== Biography ==
Andrault was the son of a salesman and a seamstress. He was bedridden for two years due to tuberculosis.

He entered the École nationale supérieure des Beaux-Arts in Paris. After graduating in 1955, Andrault joined his fellow student, Pierre Parat, in business in 1957. The pair won a competition for the construction of the Basilica Sanctuary of the Madonna delle Lacrime in Siracusa in Sicily. The controversial and modern design gained them notoriety, and they were contacted by the Caisse des dépôts et consignations for the construction of housing, working with Bouygues. Together, they built 19,000 dwellings, favoring pyramid shapes. The housing was constructed in Évry, Villepinte, Champs-sur-Marne, Plaisir, Couulommiers, and others. They built the headquarters of Havas in Neuilly-sur-Seine, the AGF headquarters in Madrid, the AccorHotels Arena in Bercy, the Tour Totem in Paris, and the Tours Société Générale and Tour Sequoia in La Défense.

Andrault and Parat parted ways in 1995. Andrault collected pre-colonial artifacts from Africa, Northern Ireland, and Burma.
