= Marcel Berthomé =

French politician (1922–2023)

Marcel Berthomé (4 April 1922 – 24 October 2023) was a French airman and politician who served as mayor of Saint-Seurin-sur-l'Isle from 1971 to 2020. From 2014 to 2020, he was the oldest mayor in France.

== Life ==
Born at Saint-Médard-de-Guizières in the Gironde department, Berthomé served in the French air force from 1938 to 1968. He was a radio operator during the Second World War, serving with the Royal Air Force before joining the Free French Air Forces in 1943. He flew more than 7,500 hours on 454 missions.

Berthomé later served in the First Indochina War and the Algerian War.

In 1971, Berthomé was elected mayor of Saint-Seurin-sur-l'Isle in the Gironde department, serving until being defeated in the 2020 French municipal elections. From 2014 to 2020, he was the oldest mayor in France.

He turned 100 in 2022 and died on 24 October 2023, at the age of 101.
