= Jean Clémentin =

French journalist, writer, and spy (1924–2023)

- Born: Jean Philippe Joseph Raoul Clémentin; 21 May 1924; Douvres-la-Délivrande, France
- Died: 5 January 2023 (aged 98)
- Occupations: Journalist; Writer

Jean Philippe Joseph Raoul Clémentin, sometimes known as Jean Manan, (21 May 1924 – 5 January 2023) was a French journalist and writer. He was one of the most influential writers for Le Canard enchaîné. In February 2022, it was revealed that he had been a spy for the StB during the Cold War, from 1957 to 1969.

== Biography ==
The son of a farmer, Clémentin attended a Jesuit school before beginning studies in business. After World War II, he went to French Indochina and served as a soldier and worked as a journalist for the Associated Press. He returned to Metropolitan France in 1950 and became a journalist for Combat, Les Cahiers internationaux, Regards, and Libération.

At the end of the 1950s, Clémentin began working for Le Canard enchaîné. Thanks to his military connections, he gained notoriety during the Algerian War. He also began investigative journalism during this time. In the 1970s, he began to take a leadership role at the newspaper. He aimed to depoliticize the newspaper and began to collaborate primarily with left-wing and far-left journalists. Due to opposition to his moves, he moved away from editing in 1976 and began to focus on literary criticism in the 1980s. Following numerous disagreements within the newspaper, he left in 1989 and devoted himself to writing.

=== Collaboration with the StB ===
In February 2022, Vincent Jauvert of L'Obs revealed that Clémentin had collaborated with the Czechoslovak secret police, the StB. He had been recruited in 1957 and submitted approximately 300 tips in 270 meetings in France and abroad. He had also published false information in Le Canard enchaîné dictated by Czechoslovak communists. A particular event in which he published false information was the disappearance of Moroccan politician Mehdi Ben Barka. Clémentin refused to comment on the issue, though communicated through his son that it was an "old affair of the 1960s [which] does not interest anyone". Nicolas Brimo, who was director of Le Canard enchaîné, was "flabbergasted".

Jean Clémentin died on 5 January 2023, at the age of 98.

== Publications ==
- Les Mémoires de Bidasse, d'après les célèbres chroniques du Canard Enchaîné (1963)
- L'Affaire Fomasi (1969)
- Les Poupées de Kirchenbronn (1974)
- La France ce n'est pas ce qu'il y a de plus grand c'est ce qu'il y a de meilleur : sotie (1976)
- Pinarque : sotie II (1977)
- Quasi (2001)
