= Berhet =

Berhet Berc'hed
- Commune
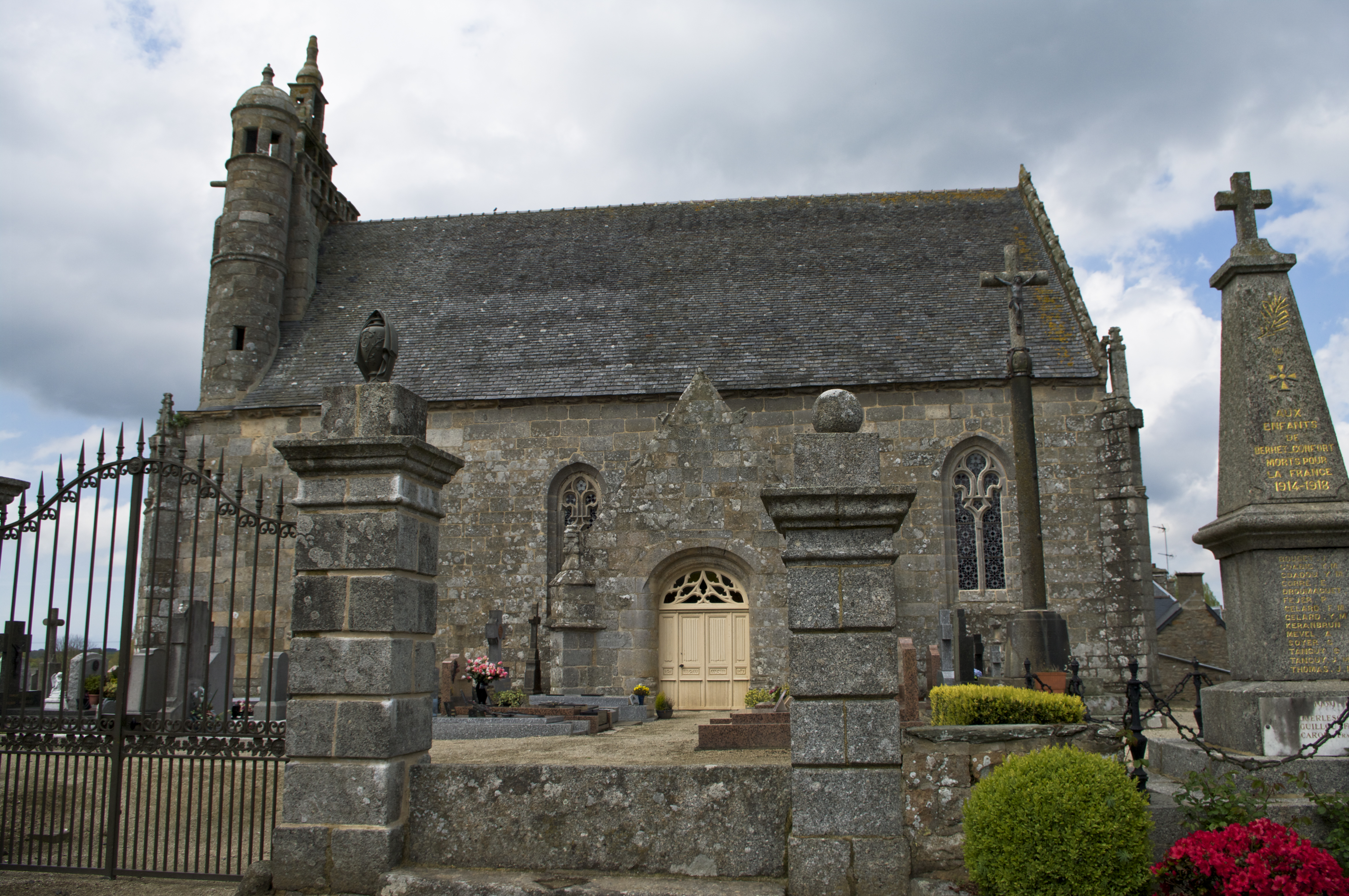
- Notre-Dame-de-Comfort chapel

- Coat of arms
- Location of Berhet
- Location within France Location within Brittany
- Coordinates: 48°41′50″N 3°18′10″W
- Country: France
- Region: Brittany
- Department: Côtes-d'Armor
- Arrondissement: Lannion
- Canton: Bégard
- Intercommunality: Lannion-Trégor Communauté

Government
  - Mayor (2023–2026): Laurence Benech
- Area^{1}: 3.23 km^{2} (1.25 sq mi)
- Highest elevation: 101 m (331 ft)
- Lowest elevation: 50 m (160 ft)
- Population (2023): 272
  - Density: 84.2/km^{2} (218/sq mi)
- Time zone: UTC+01:00 (CET)
  - Summer (DST): UTC+02:00 (CEST)
- INSEE/Postal code: 22006 /22140
- ^{1} French Land Register data, which excludes lakes, ponds, glaciers > 1 km^{2} (0.386 sq mi or 247 acres) and river estuaries.

Berhet (French pronunciation: [bɛʁɛt]; Breton: Berc'hed) is a commune in the Côtes-d'Armor department of Brittany in northwestern France.

== Population ==
Historical population
Year	Pop.	±% p.a.
1968	223	—
1975	187	−2.48%
1982	181	−0.46%
1990	217	+2.29%
1999	211	−0.31%
2007	210	−0.06%
2012	238	+2.53%
2017	257	+1.55%
2023	272	+0.95%
Source: INSEE

Inhabitants of Berhet are called Berhetois in French.

== Breton language ==
The municipality launched a linguistic plan through Ya d'ar brezhoneg on 26 May 2006.

== See also ==
- Communes of the Côtes-d'Armor department
