= Deaths in June 2023 =

The following is a list of notable deaths in June 2023.

Entries for each day are listed alphabetically by surname. A typical entry lists information in the following sequence:

- Name, age, country of citizenship at birth, subsequent country of citizenship (if applicable), reason for notability, cause of death (if known), and reference.

== June 2023 ==
=== 1 ===
- Billy Ray Adams, 84, American football player (Ole Miss Rebels).
- Ronald L. Baker, 85, American folklorist.
- Michael Batayeh, 52, American actor (Breaking Bad, American Dreamz, AmericanEast), asphyxiation.
- Anatoly Bolshakov, 92, Russian politician, member of the Soviet of Nationalities (1979–1989).
- Margit Carstensen, 83, German actress (The Bitter Tears of Petra von Kant, Martha, Possession).
- Pacho El Antifeka, 42, Puerto Rican rapper, shot.
- Gerhart Hecker, 89, Hungarian Olympic runner (1960).
- David Jones, 83, British athlete, Olympic bronze medallist (1960), liver cancer.
- Grégor Marchand, 55, French academic and archeologist.
- Jim Melchert, 92, American artist.
- Pedro Messone, 88, Chilean singer, composer and actor.
- Bobby Morgan, 96, American baseball player (Brooklyn Dodgers, Philadelphia Phillies, Chicago Cubs).
- Lamar Morris, 84, American country singer.
- Jack Potts, 87, Australian rugby union player.
- Una Power, 79-80, English-born Irish card reader and author, Lewy body dementia.
- Philippe Pozzo di Borgo, 72, French businessman (Pommery), subject of The Intouchables.
- Robert Rigot, 93, French sculptor.
- Reinhold Senn, 86, Austrian luger, Olympic silver medallist (1964).
- Anna Shay, 62, Japanese-born American socialite, businesswoman and television personality (Bling Empire), stroke.
- Roger Squires, 91, British crossword compiler.
- John Sullivan, 82, American baseball player (Detroit Tigers, New York Mets) and coach (Toronto Blue Jays).
- Cynthia Weil, 82, American Hall of Fame songwriter ("You've Lost That Lovin' Feelin'", "Here You Come Again", "Somewhere Out There"), Grammy winner (1988).
- Jeff Worthington, 62, American Paralympic athlete.

=== 2 ===
- Natasha Al-Maani, 64, Jordanian artist.
- Muhammad Afsarul Ameen, 71, Bangladeshi politician, MP (since 2009) and minister of primary and mass education (2008–2013), lung cancer.
- Bob Bolin, 84, American baseball player (San Francisco Giants, Boston Red Sox, Milwaukee Brewers).
- Walter Bradley, 77, Canadian politician, Prince Edward Island MLA (1989–1996).
- Mike Crawhall, 85, English cricketer (Northumberland, Minor Counties North).
- Jean-Camille DeGrâce, 81, Canadian educator and politician, New Brunswick MLA (1995–1999).
- Michail Kostarakos, 67, Greek military officer, chief of the general staff (2011–2015) and chairman of the European Union Military Committee (2015–2018).
- Hillar Liitoja, 68, Canadian playwright and theatre director.
- Willie Marshall, 91, Canadian ice hockey player (Hershey Bears, Toronto Maple Leafs, Baltimore Clippers).
- Bob Menne, 81, American golfer.
- Achille Ottaviani, 72, Italian journalist and politician, senator (1992–1994).
- Jacques Rozier, 96, French film director (Adieu Philippine, Du Cote D'Orouet, Maine-Ocean Express) and screenwriter.
- Kaija Saariaho, 70, Finnish composer (Petals, La Passion de Simone, D'Om le Vrai Sens), glioblastoma.
- Reno Salvail, 75, Canadian artist, photographer, and author.
- Vladyslav Savieliev, 26, Ukrainian military pilot, military combat.
- Beverly Shade, 87, American professional wrestler, complications from lung cancer.
- Yukiko Takayama, 83, Japanese screenwriter (Terror of Mechagodzilla, Genji Monogatari: Sennen no Nazo, Monarch: The Big Bear of Tallac).

=== 3 ===
- Byron Barton, 92, American writer and illustrator.
- Paul Geoffrey, 68, British-born American actor (Excalibur, Greystoke: The Legend of Tarzan, Lord of the Apes, Emily Brontë's Wuthering Heights), cancer.
- Jim Hines, 76, American sprinter and football player (Miami Dolphins, Kansas City Chiefs), Olympic champion (1968).
- Aamir Raza Husain, 66, Indian theatre actor and director.
- Conor O'Brien, 18th Baron Inchiquin, 79, English-born Irish peer.
- Khalid Kishtainy, 93, Iraqi writer and satirist.
- Aleksandr Maleyev, 75, Russian artistic gymnast, Olympic silver medallist (1972).
- Steve Mills, 65, American juggler.
- Totto Osvold, 81, Norwegian radio broadcaster (NRK).
- Dionysius Pantelić, 90, Serbian Eastern Orthodox theologian and archimandrite. (death announced on this date)
- John Regala, 55, Filipino actor (That's Entertainment, The Fatima Buen Story, Batas Ko Ay Bala), complications from cirrhosis.
- Mario Sábato, 78, Argentine film director (Y que patatín...y que patatán, Los golpes bajos, The Power of Darkness) and screenwriter.
- Michael Sheehan, 83, American Roman Catholic prelate, bishop of Lubbock (1983–1993) and archbishop of Santa Fe (1993–2015).
- Janice Wainwright, 82, British fashion designer.
- Josser Watling, 98, English footballer (Bristol Rovers).
- Marta Zabaleta, 85, Argentinian-British economist, social scientist and writer.

=== 4 ===
- Mariano Arana, 90, Uruguayan politician, intendant of Montevideo (1995–2005) and minister of housing, territorial planning and environment (2005–2008).
- Iliyas Azmi, 88, Indian politician, MP (1996–1997, 2004–2014).
- Bill Beck, 61, American politician, member of the Tennessee House of Representatives (since 2014), heart attack.
- Selahattin Çetiner, 100, Turkish military officer and politician, minister of interior (1980–1983).
- Germán Chaves, 28, Colombian racing cyclist, traffic collision.
- Roger Craig, 93, American baseball player (Brooklyn / Los Angeles Dodgers, New York Mets) and manager (San Francisco Giants), four-time World Series champion.
- Zola Dabula, 66, South African military officer, surgeon general of the SAMHS (2019–2021).
- David Emery, 76, British sports journalist.
- Bartolomé Gamundi, 84, Puerto Rican businessman and politician, secretary of the department of economic development and commerce (2007–2009), cancer.
- Macram Max Gassis, 84, Sudanese Roman Catholic prelate, bishop of El Obeid (1988–2013).
- John Glenn, 93, American baseball player (St. Louis Cardinals).
- Pierre Gruneberg, 92, German-born French ski and swim instructor.
- Norma Hunt, 85, American businesswoman, owner of the Kansas City Chiefs (since 2006).
- Józef Klasa, 91, Polish politician, MP (1972–1976).
- Leon Kovalsky, 83, Russian politician, chairman of the Samara Regional Duma (1994–2001).
- Luciana Lagorara, 86, Italian Olympic gymnast (1956).
- Sulochana Latkar, 94, Indian actress (Sunghursh, Main Sunder Hoon, Dil Daulat Duniya), respiratory failure.
- Dora María, 89, Mexican folk singer, respiratory arrest.
- Luigi Marrucci, 78, Italian Roman Catholic prelate, bishop of Civitavecchia-Tarquinia (2011–2020).
- Perry McCarty, 91, American environmental engineer.
- Mochtar Pabottingi, 77, Indonesian writer, heart attack.
- Zdeněk Pouzar, 91, Czech mycologist.
- Scott Schinder, 61, American music critic and journalist (Rolling Stone, Entertainment Weekly, Trouser Press).
- Sharari al-Shakhanbeh, 80, Jordanian politician, minister of agriculture (2004–2005), senator (2020–2022).
- George Winston, 74, American pianist (December, Summer, Forest), Grammy winner (1996), cancer.

=== 5 ===
- Henry E. Allison, 86, American philosopher.
- Aud Blattmann, 85, Norwegian politician, MP (1985–2001).
- Elspeth Campbell, Baroness Campbell of Pittenweem, 83, British baroness, heart attack.
- Giorgos Georgiou, 71, Greek television host and radio broadcaster, cancer.
- Astrud Gilberto, 83, Brazilian samba and bossa nova singer ("The Girl from Ipanema"), Grammy winner (1965).
- W. J. Gobrecht, 92, American football player and basketball player.
- Robert Hanssen, 79, American FBI agent and convicted spy, colon cancer.
- Jimmy Hotz, 69, American inventor and record producer, heart attack.
- Tina Joemat-Pettersson, 59, South African politician, minister of energy (2014–2017) and agriculture (2009–2014), twice MP.
- Paul Judson, 89, American basketball player.
- Mads Lundby Hansen, 53, Danish economist.
- Anatoly Makarenko, 86, Russian engineer and politician, member of the Supreme Soviet of Russia (1986–1988).
- Vadim Malakhatko, 46, Ukrainian-Belgian chess grandmaster, heart attack.
- Jennifer A. McMahon, 67, Australian philosopher.
- Ron Miller, 78, American fencing coach.
- Mohamed Moatassim, 67, Moroccan scholar and politician, advisor to Mohammed VI (since 1999).
- John Morris, Baron Morris of Aberavon, 91, British politician, attorney general for England and Wales (1997–1999), MP (1959–2001) and member of the House of Lords (since 2001).
- Bob Munn, 83, Australian footballer (South Melbourne).
- Robert J. O'Conor Jr., 88, American jurist, judge of the U.S. District Court for Southern Texas (1975–1984).
- Lilita Ozoliņa, 75, Latvian actress (Oļegs un Aina, Unfinished Supper, Double Trap).
- Robert Pack, 94, American poet.
- Gufi Paintal, 78, Indian actor (Suhaag, Daava, Mahabharat).
- Ahmed Emad El-Din Radi, 67, Egyptian doctor and politician, minister of health (2015–2018).
- Egor Shuppe, 52, Russian-British businessman and venture investor, co-founder of Cityline.
- Kollam Sudhi, 39, Indian actor (Kuttanadan Marpappa, Adhyarathri, Keshu Ee Veedinte Nadhan), traffic collision.
- Jack Whitford, 99, British Olympic gymnast (1952).

=== 6 ===
- Nisar Ahmad Ahmadi, Afghan politician, acting governor of Badakhshan, car bomb.
- Rustam Ali, 103, Bangladeshi politician, MP (1979–1982).
- Béla Andrásfai, 92, Hungarian mathematician.
- Jack Baldschun, 86, American baseball player (Philadelphia Phillies, Cincinnati Reds, San Diego Padres), leukemia.
- Linda Burdette, 74, American gymnastics coach (West Virginia University).
- Thomas G. Carruthers, 94, American politician, member of the Connecticut State Senate (1973–1975).
- Pat Casey, 29, American BMX rider, motorcycle crash.
- Kevin Considine, 93, Australian rugby league player (Newtown Jets), cancer.
- Pat Cooper, 93, American actor (Fighting Back, Analyze This, Analyze That) and comedian.
- Paul Eckstein, 59, American television writer and producer (Godfather of Harlem, Narcos, Law & Order: Criminal Intent).
- Gints Freimanis, 38, Latvian footballer (Jelgava, Spartaks Jūrmala, national team).
- Françoise Gilot, 101, French painter.
- Waldo Grant, 76, American serial killer.
- Peter Henrici, 95, Swiss Roman Catholic prelate and philosopher, auxiliary bishop of Chur (1993–2007).
- Tom Herzfeld, 87, Australian politician, Western Australia MLA (1977–1983).
- William Howarth, 82, American writer and professor.
- Árni Johnsen, 79, Icelandic journalist and politician, member of the Althing (1983–1987, 1991–2001, 2007–2013).
- Lino Jordan, 79, Italian Olympic biathlete (1972, 1976).
- Pavel Lebeda, 82, Czech medical doctor and politician, senator (2008–2014).
- Lu Yuanjiu, 103, Chinese physicist, member of the Chinese Academy of Sciences and Engineering.
- Virginia Marí, 60, Spanish politician, mayor of Ibiza (2014–2015) and member of the Parliament of the Balearic Islands (2019–2023), lung cancer.
- Jim May, 88, Australian chemical engineer.
- Teddy McCarthy, 57, Irish hurler (Cork) and Gaelic footballer (Cork).
- John McCoy, 79, American politician, member of the Washington House of Representatives (2003–2013) and Senate (2013–2020).
- Mike McFarlane, 63, English sprinter, Olympic silver medallist (1988), heart attack.
- Tony McPhee, 79, English guitarist (The Groundhogs), complications from a fall.
- Everett Mendelsohn, 91, American academic and historian.
- Sankaranarayana Menon, 94, Indian Kalaripayattu teacher.
- Tony Murray, 103, French-born British businessman (Andrews Sykes Group).
- Noreen Nash, 99, American actress (The Big Fix, Phantom from Space, Giant).
- Neal Petties, 82, American football player (Baltimore Colts).
- Dinny Powell, 90, British actor and stuntman.
- Richard E. Snyder, 90, American publishing executive (Simon & Schuster, Western Publishing), heart failure.
- William Spriggs, 68, American economist, stroke.

=== 7 ===
- Aud-Inger Aure, 80, Norwegian politician, minister of justice (1997–1999).
- Kenneth P. Bergquist, 78, American brigadier general.
- Billy Bischoff Jr., 85, Australian rugby league player (Balmain Tigers).
- Marino Busdachin, 66, Italian human rights activist.
- Irma Capece Minutolo, 87, Italian operatic singer and actress (Neapolitans in Milan, Young Toscanini).
- Banani Ghosh, Indian Rabindra Sangeet singer.
- Saskia Hamilton, 56, American poet, cancer.
- Eva Hög, 95, Finnish Olympic cross-country skier (1960).
- Niel Immelman, 78, South African pianist, heart failure.
- The Iron Sheik, 80, Iranian-born American Hall of Fame professional wrestler (AWA, WWF), cardiac arrest.
- Tom Jolls, 89, American television personality (WKBW-TV).
- Richard W. Kloubec, 92, American politician, member (1973–1974, 1977–1992) and speaker (1987–1988) of the North Dakota House of Representatives.
- Don Lancaster, 83, American author.
- Lim Kean Chye, 103, Malaysian lawyer and independence activist.
- Stefan Ljungqvist, 74, Swedish opera singer and actor (Polisen i Strömstad, Monopol).
- Kato Lubwama, 52, Ugandan filmmaker, musician, and politician, MP (2016–2021).
- Phyllis W. McQuaid, 95, American politician, member of the Minnesota Senate (1983–1990).
- Sir Ivan Menezes, 63, Indian-born American-British beverage industry executive, CEO of Diageo (since 2013), complications from stomach ulcer surgery.
- Red Morrison, 91, American basketball player (Boston Celtics).
- Leonardo Nierman, 90, Mexican artist.
- Annie Okonkwo, 63, Nigerian politician, senator (2007–2011).
- Karol Pinkas, 73, Polish chess International Master.
- Miroslav Řepa, 93, Czech architect.
- Ethna Rouse, 85, New Zealand cricketer (Canterbury, national team).
- Baena Soares, 92, Brazilian diplomat, secretary general of the Organization of American States (1984–1994).
- Lisl Steiner, 95, Austrian-American photographer, photojournalist (Life, Newsweek), and documentary filmmaker.
- Valentin Tatarchuk, 85, Russian politician, deputy (1994–1996).
- Eve Tetaz, 91, American anti-war activist.

=== 8 ===
- Klaus Beer, 80, German long jumper, Olympic silver medallist (1968).
- Robert Holmes Bell, 79, American jurist, judge (since 1987) and chief judge (2001–2008) of the U.S. District Court for Western Michigan.
- Peter Belli, 79, Danish singer and actor (The Double Man, Truly Human, Koko-di Koko-da).
- Djaffar Bensetti, 60, Algerian trumpeter and saxophonist.
- Guido Bodrato, 90, Italian politician, minister of public education (1980–1982), deputy (1968–1994) and MEP (1999–2004).
- Charles Kimberlin Brain, 92, South African paleontologist, director of the Transvaal Museum (1965–1991).
- Melvin D. Close Jr., 89, American politician.
- Paul Coghlan, 79, Irish politician, senator (1997–2020) and leas-chathaoirleach (2016–2020).
- Alan Dowding, 94, Australian cricketer (Oxford University, Commonwealth XI, MCC).
- Charles Elworthy, 61, New Zealand economist and social scientist.
- Fields of Omagh, 25, Australian Thoroughbred racehorse.
- Julie Garwood, 78, American author (Ransom).
- Wade Goodwyn, 63, American news journalist (NPR), cancer.
- Pavel Gurkalov, 84, Russian politician, senator (1994–1996).
- Riaz Haider, 88, Indian-born American cardiologist.
- Véronique Jardin, 56, French Olympic swimmer (1984, 1992).
- Louis LeBel, 83, Canadian jurist, puisne justice of the supreme court (2000–2014).
- Renato Longo, 85, Italian Hall of Fame cyclo-cross racer.
- István Maróthy, 80, Hungarian Olympic wrestler (1972).
- Ian McGinty, 38, American comic book writer and artist (Bravest Warriors, Bee and PuppyCat).
- Wayne L. Nicholson, 65, American microbiologist and scientist.
- Domingo Perurena, 79, Spanish road racing cyclist.
- Maria Peschek, 69, German cabaret artist, actress and playwright, heart attack.
- Oscar Pezoa, 90, Argentine Olympic cyclist (1952).
- Rale Rasic, 87, Yugoslav-born Australian football player (Proleter Zrenjanin) and manager (Marconi Stallions, national team).
- Pat Robertson, 93, American televangelist (The 700 Club), founder of CBN and Regent University.
- Jorge Roldán, 82, Guatemalan football player (Aurora, national team) and manager (Once Municipal).
- Mari Ruti, 59, Finnish-born Canadian philosopher.
- Carlos Sada, 70, Mexican politician and diplomat, ambassador to the United States (2016–2017).
- André Simon, 35, Antiguan road racing cyclist, traffic collision.
- Craig Stewart, 66, Australian football player (Collingwood, Richmond).
- Marlene van Staden, 42, South African politician, mayor of Modimolle–Mookgophong (since 2016), cancer.
- Nugroho Wisnumurti, 83, Indonesian diplomat, permanent representative to the UN in Geneva (2000–2004) and president of the UN Security Council (1995, 1996).

=== 9 ===
- Camilla Ah Kin, 58, Australian actress (Going Home, Stupid, Stupid Man, Holding the Man).
- Ahn Yeong-gi, 87, South Korean doctor and politician, MNA (1988–1992).
- Jim Allen, 100, New Zealand visual artist, AFNZ Icon (since 2015).
- Laurent Belanger, 92, American politician, member of the Florida House of Representatives (1974–1976).
- Roger Boon, 88, New Zealand rugby union player (Taranaki, national team) and coach (Wanganui).
- Barbara Borys-Damięcka, 85, Polish theatre director and politician, senator (since 2007).
- Ndoye Douts, 50, Senegalese plastic artist.
- Dinah Faust, 96, German-born French actress and singer.
- Carlos Gamou, 63, Uruguayan politician, deputy (1995–2000, 2005–2015).
- Otis Grand, 73, Lebanese-born American blues musician.
- Muhammed Gwady, 64, Egyptian writer and philosopher.
- Paul D. Hanson, 83, American biblical scholar.
- Esme Harris, 90, British Olympic diver (1948).
- Yumie Hiraiwa, 91, Japanese author, pneumonia.
- George Isaac, 85, Egyptian political activist, co-founder of Kefaya.
- Yoshikazu Kawaguchi, 84, Japanese natural farmer.
- Denis Kessler, 71, French businessman, CEO of SCOR SE (since 2002).
- Serajul Alam Khan, 82, Bangladeshi philosopher and political activist, founder of JASAD and co-founder of Mujib Bahini, respiratory failure.
- Daniel Mandon, 84, French politician, deputy (1993–1997).
- Floyd Martin, 93, Canadian ice hockey player, Olympic silver medallist (1960).
- Helmar Müller, 83, German runner, Olympic bronze medalist (1968).
- Firouz Naderi, 77, Iranian-American scientist.
- Wladimir Pomar, 86, Brazilian journalist, author, and activist.
- Siddiqur Rahman, 78, Bangladeshi politician, MP (1979–1982, 1988–1990).
- Ron Richard, 75, American politician, member (2003–2011) and speaker (2009–2011) of the Missouri House of Representatives, member of the Missouri Senate (2011–2019), complications from bladder cancer.
- Michael Shirima, 80, Tanzanian businessman, founder of Precision Air.
- Vasile Tonoiu, 82, Romanian philosopher.
- Alain Touraine, 97, French sociologist (Critique of Modernity).
- Alton Waldon, 86, American politician, member of the New York State Assembly (1983–1987), State Senate (1991–1999), and U.S. House of Representatives (1986–1987).
- John F. Wood Jr., 87, American politician, member of the Maryland House of Delegates (1987–2015).

=== 10 ===
- Hassana Alidou, 60, Nigerien diplomat, ambassador to the United States (2015–2019).
- Clive Barker, 78, South African football player (Durban United) and manager (AmaZulu, national team), complications from Lewy body dementia.
- Thelma Bates, 93, British oncologist.
- Étienne De Beule, 69, Belgian racing cyclist.
- Ken Hansen, 71, American politician, member of the Montana Senate (2002–2010).
- Kiyomi Hayama, 78, Japanese choreographer (Takarazuka Revue).
- Don Hood, 73, American baseball player (Baltimore Orioles, Cleveland Indians, Kansas City Royals).
- Ted Kaczynski, 81, American mathematician and domestic terrorist (Unabomber Manifesto), suicide by hanging.
- Fakhri Khorvash, 94, Iranian actress (Mr. Naive, Chess of the Wind, A Little Kiss).
- Eric Kokish, 76, Canadian bridge player.
- Virgil Luken, 80, American Olympic swimmer (1964).
- A. Mangalam, 97, Singaporean-born Malaysian nun and human rights activist.
- Yannis Markopoulos, 84, Greek composer (Young Aphrodites, Sin, Who Pays the Ferryman?), cancer.
- Hans Mössmer, 91, Swiss Olympic ice hockey player (1956).
- Jari Niinimäki, 65, Finnish footballer (Ilves, AIK, national team).
- Nuccio Ordine, 64, Italian literary scholar and philosopher, stroke.
- Park Je-chun, 78, South Korean poet.
- Roger Payne, 88, American biologist, environmentalist and record producer (Songs of the Humpback Whale).
- Berdibek Saparbayev, 70, Kazakh politician, deputy prime minister (2014–2015, 2019–2020) and twice minister of labour and social protection of the population.
- John Spadavecchia, 84, Italian-born American poker player.
- Adrian Sprott, 61, Scottish footballer (Meadowbank Thistle, Hamilton Academical, Stenhousemuir).
- Jim Turner, 82, American football player (New York Jets, Denver Broncos), heart failure.

=== 11 ===
- David Anderson, 97, American politician, member of the Connecticut House of Representatives (1981–1993).
- Mikio Aoki, 89, Japanese politician, member of the House of Councillors (1986–2010), chief cabinet secretary (1999–2000), and acting prime minister (2000).
- J. C. Arban, 89, American football coach.
- László Balogh, 93, Hungarian painter.
- Charles Cadogan, 8th Earl Cadogan, 86, British peer and football administrator, chairman of Chelsea (1981–1982).
- Stanley Clinton-Davis, Baron Clinton-Davis, 94, British politician, minister of state for trade policy (1997–1998), MP (1970–1983) and member of the House of Lords (1990–2018).
- Mangal Dhillon, 64, Indian actor (Amba, Zindagi Ek Juaa, Train to Pakistan), cancer.
- David Gilmour, 91, Canadian businessman, founder of Fiji Water.
- Panagiotis Hadjinikolaou, 90, Greek dentist and politician, MP (1974–1996).
- Charles Hessenthaler, 75, American politician.
- Suna Kan, 86, Turkish violinist.
- Franz S. Leichter, 92, Austrian-born American politician, member of the New York State Assembly (1969–1974) and Senate (1975–1998), pneumonia and renal failure.
- Liu Shouren, 89, Chinese scientist, member of the Chinese Academy of Engineering.
- Sadao Nakajima, 88, Japanese film director (Kunoichi ninpō, Sanada Yukimura no Bōryaku, Seburi Monogatari), pneumonia.
- John Nkemngong Nkengasong, 64, Cameroonian playwright, novelist, and poet.
- Michael A. Noonan, 82, Irish-born New Zealand television writer (Close to Home, The Governor, Homeward Bound).
- Jesús Ruiz, Spanish politician, deputy (1986–1989), complications from COVID-19.
- Magda Saleh, 79, Egyptian ballerina.
- Anatoly Sedykh, 60, Russian serial killer, suicide.
- János Söre, 88, Hungarian Olympic cyclist (1960).
- Jean Wicki, 89, Swiss bobsledder, Olympic champion (1972).
- Danny Young, 51, American baseball player (Chicago Cubs).
- Rob Young, 76, Canadian sound engineer (Unforgiven, Romeo + Juliet, Jumanji), complications from a fall.

=== 12 ===
- Silvio Berlusconi, 86, Italian politician, three-time prime minister, MP (1994–2013, since 2022) and twice MEP, leukemia.
- Rodolfo Biazon, 88, Filipino military officer and politician, chief of staff (1991), member of the House of Representatives (2010–2016) and twice senator, lung cancer.
- Michael Catt, 70, American pastor (Sherwood Baptist Church) and film producer (Fireproof, Courageous), complications from prostate cancer.
- Carol Higgins Clark, 66, American mystery author and actress, appendix cancer.
- Paolo Di Paolo, 98, Italian photographer.
- Jack Earls, 90, American singer.
- Meindert Fennema, 77, Dutch political scientist.
- John Fru Ndi, 81, Cameroonian politician and opposition activist, chairman of the Social Democratic Front (since 1990).
- Patrick Gasienica, 24, American Olympic ski jumper (2022), traffic collision.
- Mette Gjerskov, 56, Danish politician, minister for food, agriculture and fisheries (2011–2013) and MP (since 2005), nerve inflammation.
- Harvey Glance, 66, American sprinter, Olympic champion (1976), cardiac arrest.
- Sergey Goryachev, 52, Russian major general, missile strike.
- Kazan Khan, Indian actor (Senthamizh Paattu, En Aasai Machan, Gandhi Pirantha Mann), heart attack.
- Ronnie Knight, 89, English nightclub owner and convicted robber, pneumonia.
- Reggie Moore, 42, American-born Angolan basketball player (Maccabi Givat Shmuel, UB La Palma, Primeiro de Agosto).
- Douglas Nonis, 86, Malaysian Olympic field hockey player (1964).
- Francesco Nuti, 68, Italian film director (Stregati, The Pool Hustlers), actor (West of Paperino), and comedian.
- John Romita Sr., 93, American comic book artist (Spider-Man, Captain America), co-creator of Wolverine.
- Stan Savran, 76, American sports media personality, lung cancer.
- Richard Severo, 90, American science journalist (The New York Times), complications from Parkinson's disease.
- Shigeru Sugishita, 97, Japanese baseball player (Nagoya/Chunichi Dragons, Daimai Orions) and coach (Hanshin Tigers), pneumonia.
- William Lloyd George, 3rd Viscount Tenby, 95, British peer, member of the House of Lords (1983–2015).
- Jane Resh Thomas, 86, American children's writer and critic.
- Treat Williams, 71, American actor (Hair, Prince of the City, Everwood), traffic collision.
- Vyacheslav Zaytsev, 70, Russian volleyball player, Olympic champion (1980).

=== 13 ===
- Dennis Argall, 79, Australian diplomat, ambassador to China (1984–1985).
- David M. Bartley, 88, American politician, member (1963–1976) and speaker (1969–1975) of the Massachusetts House of Representatives.
- Philippe Borer, 68, Swiss violinist.
- Pierre Cabanes, 92, French historian and epigraphist (University of Paris X-Nanterre).
- Christy Dignam, 63, Irish singer (Aslan), cancer.
- Edward Fredkin, 88, American physicist, computer scientist and businessman.
- Lonnie Hammargren, 85, American neurosurgeon and politician, lieutenant governor of Nevada (1995–1999).
- Louis Holmes, 38, American football player (California Redwoods, Spokane Shock, Los Angeles Kiss).
- Huang Yongyu, 98, Chinese painter.
- Bret Hudson, 49, Australian Olympic gymnast (1996).
- Nick Kaiser, 68, British cosmologist, heart failure.
- Simpson Kalisher, 96, American photojournalist.
- Nahim Khadi, 75, Sierra Leonean footballer (East End Lions, Mighty Blackpool, national team), president of the Sierra Leone Football Association (2004–2012).
- April Kingsley, 82, American art critic, complications from Alzheimer's disease.
- Eina Kwon, 34, American restaurant owner, shot.
- Viktor Lisitsky, 83, Russian gymnast, five-time Olympic silver medallist (1964, 1968).
- Jean-Pierre Marongiu, 66, French businessman and writer.
- Cormac McCarthy, 89, American novelist (Blood Meridian, All the Pretty Horses, The Road), Pulitzer Prize winner (2007).
- Curtis L. Meinert, 88, American epidemiologist.
- Joachim N'Dayen, 88, Central African Roman Catholic prelate, archbishop of Bangui (1970–2003).
- Constantin Nicolescu, 77, Romanian politician, senator (2000–2004), cancer.
- Paul Rendall, 69, English rugby union player (Wasps, national team), complications from motor neuron disease.

=== 14 ===
- Khamis Abakar, Sudanese politician, governor of West Darfur (since 2021), assassinated.
- Afeez Agoro, 47, Nigerian record holder, country's tallest person, complications from acromegaly.
- Ámundi Ámundason, 78, Icelandic talent agent and music publisher.
- Charles L. Blockson, 89, American historian, author, and bibliophile.
- Henri Boulad, 91, Egyptian-Hungarian Jesuit priest and human rights activist.
- Muriel Spurgeon Carder, 100, British-born Canadian Baptist minister.
- Mavis Cheek, 75, English novelist.
- Raimondo Crociani, 77, Italian film editor (A Special Day, We All Loved Each Other So Much, Le Bal).
- Joaquín Espert, 84, Spanish politician, president of La Rioja (1987–1990).
- James E. Faller, 89, American physicist.
- Luisa Gándara, 69, Puerto Rican politician, first lady (2005–2009) and member of the House of Representatives (2013–2017), breast cancer.
- Robert Gottlieb, 92, American writer and editor (The New Yorker).
- John Hollins, 76, English football player (Chelsea, Arsenal, national team) and manager, heart failure.
- Charles Huband, 91, Canadian politician and judge, leader of the Manitoba Liberal Party (1975–1978) and judge of the Manitoba Court of Appeal (1979–2007).
- Roman Jackiw, 83, American theoretical physicist, Dirac Medalist (1998).
- Homer Jones, 82, American football player (New York Giants, Cleveland Browns), lung cancer.
- George Leslie, 86, Scottish politician.
- Vincentius Sonny Loho, 66, Indonesian accountant and bureaucrat.
- Charles C. Lovell, 93, American jurist, judge of the U.S. District Court for Montana (since 1985).
- Warren McGraw, 84, American lawyer, politician, and judge, justice of the Supreme Court of Appeals of West Virginia (1999–2004).
- Titus Okere, 94, Nigerian footballer (Swindon Town, national team).
- K. R. Parthasarathy, 86, Indian statistician.
- John Pelling, 87, British Olympic fencer.
- Anne Pellowski, 89, Polish-American educator and author.
- Henry Petroski, 81, American engineer and professor.
- Jordi Porta i Ribalta, 86, Spanish Catalan cultural activist, president of Òmnium Cultural (2002–2010).
- Kjell Rasmussen, 95, Norwegian diplomat, ambassador to Greece (1981–1986), Libya (1984–1986), and Finland (1989–1994).
- Sharda, 85, Indian playback singer (Suraj, Gumnaam, Around the World).
- Vladimir Shmelyov, 76, Russian modern pentathlete, Olympic champion (1972).
- Nikolay Sviridov, 84, Russian Olympic long-distance runner (1968, 1972).
- Dmitri Tarasov, 44, Russian ice hockey player (Amur Khabarovsk, Salavat Yulaev Ufa, Dynamo Moscow).
- Maurice Taylor, 97, British Roman Catholic prelate, bishop of Galloway (1981–2004).

=== 15 ===
- David P. Calleo, 88, American political scientist.
- Gheorghe Dungu, 94, Romanian footballer (Rapid București, national team).
- Beatrix Eypeltauer, 93, Austrian politician, member of the National Council (1975–1983).
- Ruth Fitzpatrick, 90, American Roman Catholic activist.
- Patrick Guzman, 55, Canadian-Filipino actor (Mahirap Maging Pogi, O-Ha! Ako Pa?, Muntik Nang Maabot ang Langit), heart attack.
- Jon Haggins, 79, American fashion designer.
- Sir James Hardy, 90, Australian winemaker and Olympic sailor (1964, 1968).
- Glenda Jackson, 87, English actress (Women in Love, Sunday Bloody Sunday, A Touch of Class) and politician, MP (1992–2015), Oscar winner (1970, 1973).
- Avtar Singh Khanda, Khalistani independence activist, died in disputed circumstances.
- Antonio Jiménez Quiles, 88, Spanish road cyclist.
- Bill McKim, 81, British Olympic middle-distance runner (1964). (death announced on this date)
- Gordon McQueen, 70, Scottish football player (Leeds United, Manchester United, national team) and manager, complications from dementia.
- William C. Roberts, 90, American cardiologist.
- Donald Triplett, 89, American medical figure, first person diagnosed with autism, cancer.
- Bohdan Urbankowski, 80, Polish writer.

=== 16 ===
- Bob Brown, 81, American Hall of Fame football player (Philadelphia Eagles, Los Angeles Rams, Oakland Raiders), complications from a stroke.
- Norman Burtenshaw, 97, English football referee.
- Anadi Charan Das, 88, Indian politician, MP (1971–1977, 1980–1996).
- Nicola De Angelis, 84, Italian Roman Catholic prelate, auxiliary bishop of Toronto (1992–2002) and bishop of Peterborough (2002–2014).
- Peter Dickinson, 88, English composer and musicologist.
- Daniel Ellsberg, 92, American whistleblower (Pentagon Papers), pancreatic cancer.
- Sir Ben Helfgott, 93, Polish-born British Holocaust survivor and Olympic weightlifter (1956, 1960).
- Noriko Kamakura, 83, Japanese occupational therapist and medical researcher.
- Manabu Kitabeppu, 65, Japanese Hall of Fame baseball player (Hiroshima Toyo Carp), leukemia.
- Gennady Kulik, 88, Russian politician, minister of agriculture (1990–1991), first deputy prime minister (1990–1991) and twice MP.
- Micael Lundmark, 36, Swedish Olympic snowboarder (2006), drowned.
- Gino Mäder, 26, Swiss Olympic road cyclist (2020), race collision.
- Armand de Mestral, 81, Canadian legal scholar, multiple myeloma.
- Rita Reif, 94, American newspaper columnist and author.
- Bruce Roberts, 93, American photographer and author.
- Alfredo Rojas, 86, Argentine footballer (Lanús, Boca Juniors, national team), heart attack.
- Norman R. Stone Jr., 87, American politician, member of the Maryland House of Delegates (1963–1967) and Senate (1967–2015).
- Angela Thorne, 84, British actress (Lady Oscar, To the Manor Born, Silent Hours).
- Dave Viti, 83, American football player (Hamilton Tiger-Cats). (death announced on this date)
- Paxton Whitehead, 85, English actor (Camelot, Back to School, Kate & Leopold), complications from a fall.
- Hanna Zembrzuska, 88, Polish actress.

=== 17 ===
- Sri Adiningsih, 62, Indonesian economics professor, chairperson of the Presidential Advisory Council (2015–2019).
- Stella Arach-Amoko, 69, Ugandan judge, justice of the Supreme Court (since 2013).
- Sir Bhinod Bacha, 80, Mauritian civil servant, traffic collision.
- Oleg Betin, 72, Russian politician, head of Tambov Oblast (1995, 1999–2015), cancer.
- Michael Dargan, 94, Irish cricketer.
- Clark Haggans, 46, American football player (Pittsburgh Steelers, Arizona Cardinals, San Francisco 49ers).
- Yngve Hågensen, 84, Norwegian trade unionist, leader of the Norwegian Confederation of Trade Unions (1989–2001).
- Sir Michael Hopkins, 88, English architect (Portcullis House), complications from vascular dementia.
- James R. Hurley, 91, American politician, member of the New Jersey General Assembly (1968–1982) and Senate (1982–1990).
- Bill James, 93, Welsh novelist.
- Subramanyan Chenna Keshu, 97, Indian air force officer and engineer.
- Grigory Klinishov, 92, Russian physicist, co-creator of the RDS-37 hydrogen bomb, suicide. (body discovered on this date)
- Maria Lampadaridou-Pothou, 89, Greek novelist, poet, and playwright.
- Dave Maclean, 78, Brazilian singer-songwriter.
- Gus Newport, 88, American politician, mayor of Berkeley, California (1979–1986).
- Siobhan O'Sullivan, 49, Australian political scientist and political theorist, ovarian cancer.
- Naum Prifti, 91, Albanian writer, screenwriter and essayist.
- Nicky Singer, 66, English novelist (Feather Boy), stroke.
- Walter Stamm, 81, Austrian footballer (Admira Wien, national team). (death announced on this date)

=== 18 ===
- Sher Muhammad Baloch, Pakistani politician, MNA (2002–2013).
- Paul Barber, 80, English cheesemaker.
- Sheldon Bergstrom, 51, Canadian actor (A.R.C.H.I.E., SuperGrid, I Downloaded a Ghost).
- Juan Alfredo Biaggi Lama, 71, Dominican lawyer, academic and judge, heart attack.
- Big Pokey, 48, American rapper (Screwed Up Click, "Sittin' Sidewayz").
- Jim Brandenburg, 87, American college basketball coach (Wyoming Cowboys, San Diego State Aztecs).
- Jellie Brouwer, 59, Dutch journalist and radio presenter, cancer.
- Cameron Buchanan, 76, Scottish politician, MSP (2013–2016).
- Gérard Charasse, 79, French politician, deputy (1997–2017).
- Wenceslas Compaoré, 88, Burkinabé Roman Catholic prelate, bishop of Manga (1997–2010).
- Christian Espiritu, 89, Filipino fashion designer.
- Isabel da Costa Ferreira, 49, East Timorese human rights activist, first lady (2012–2017), cancer.
- Kent Ford, 92, American astronomer.
- Anders Ruben Forsblom, 91, Finnish Olympic cyclist (1952).
- Dick Hall, 92, American baseball player (Pittsburgh Pirates, Baltimore Orioles, Philadelphia Phillies), multiple myeloma and heart failure.
- Lim Ji-hye, 37, South Korean model and YouTuber.
- Sir Robert Malpas, 95, British engineer and businessman.
- Adriano Mazzoletti, 87, Italian musicologist.
- Nasrollah Nasehpour, 82, Iranian musician.
- Hardeep Singh Nijjar, 46, Indian Sikh separatist, shot.
- Graziano Origa, 70, Italian comic book artist.
- Poojappura Ravi, 82, Indian actor (Puthariyankam, Kaattu Kallan, Guppy) and comedian.
- Anastasia-Patricia Rubinska, 27, Polish hotel worker, strangled. (body discovered on this date)
- Charley Scales, 85, American football player (Cleveland Browns, Pittsburgh Steelers, Montreal Alouettes).
- Bernd Schroeder, 79, German writer (Alte Liebe).
- Geoffrey Stevens, 83, Canadian journalist (The Globe and Mail), heart attack.
- Cornel Țăranu, 88, Romanian composer.
- Teresa Taylor, 60, American drummer (Butthole Surfers) and actress (Slacker), lung disease.
- David Walker, 66, British air marshal, brain cancer.
- Wan Sha Lang, 74, Taiwanese singer.
- Sabine Wils, 64, German politician, MEP (since 2009).
- Rosario Zúñiga, 59, Mexican actress (Salvador).
- Notable people killed in the Titan submersible implosion:
  - Shahzada Dawood, 48, Pakistani-British businessman
  - Hamish Harding, 58, British businessman
  - Paul-Henri Nargeolet, 77, French navy commander and explorer
  - Stockton Rush, 61, American businessman, CEO and founder of OceanGate

=== 19 ===
- Billy Bales, 94, English motorcycle speedway rider (Yarmouth Bloaters, Norwich Stars, Sheffield Tigers).
- Michael A. Banks, 72, American writer.
- Karolis Chvedukas, 32, Lithuanian footballer (Sūduva, Waterford, national team).
- Gabriella Csapó-Fekete, 68, Hungarian Olympic volleyball player (1976, 1980).
- George Frazier, 68, American baseball player (St. Louis Cardinals, New York Yankees, Minnesota Twins).
- Liviu Hodorcă, 61, Romanian rugby union player (Steaua București, national team).
- Tay Li Leng, 41, Malaysian Olympic swimmer (1996).
- Bernie Massey, 83, Australian footballer (Melbourne).
- Jim McCourt, 79, Irish boxer, Olympic bronze medalist (1964).
- Gerald C. Meyers, 94, American businessman, CEO of American Motors Corporation (1977–1982).
- Max Morath, 96, American ragtime pianist, television presenter and author.
- Diane Rowe, 90, English table tennis player, cancer.
- Gabriele Schnaut, 72, German opera singer (Bayreuth Festival, Hamburg State Opera, Bavarian State Opera).
- Gaetano Troja, 78, Italian footballer (Palermo, Brescia, Bari), complications from diabetes.

=== 20 ===
- Choi Sung-bong, 33, South Korean singer, suicide.
- Sylvester da Cunha, 92, Indian advertising professional (Amul girl campaign).
- Robert Elegant, 95, American-British author (Mandarin) and journalist.
- Rogelio Esquivel Medina, 83, Mexican Roman Catholic prelate, auxiliary bishop of México (2001–2008).
- Phyllis Gomda Hsi, 85, Taiwanese vocalist, complications from a fall.
- Rohana Jalil, 68, Malaysian singer.
- M. A. Kuttappan, 76, Indian politician, Kerala MLA (1980–1982, 1987–1991, 1996–2006).
- Brison Manor, 70, American football player (Denver Broncos, Tampa Bay Buccaneers).
- Vyacheslav Nagovitsin, 83, Russian composer.
- Rosalía Peredo, 71, Mexican politician and social activist, deputy (1985–1988) and senator (2006–2012).
- Zain Safar-ud-Din, 85, Malaysian Olympic cyclist (1964).
- Luís Saias, 98, Portuguese politician, minister of agriculture (1978).
- H. Lee Sarokin, 94, American jurist, judge of the U.S. District Court of New Jersey (1979–1994) and Court of Appeals for the Third Circuit (1994–1996).
- Claude Sarraute, 95, French writer and journalist (Le Monde, Les Grosses Têtes).
- Doris Stockhausen, 99, German music pedagogue.
- John Waddington, 63, English guitarist (The Pop Group, Maximum Joy, Perfume).
- Ray Wheatley, 74, Australian boxer and Hall of Fame official.
- Paolo Zavallone, 90, Italian singer and composer.

=== 21 ===
- Bruce Bourke, 94, Australian Olympic swimmer.
- Paul Cardona, 70, Maltese Roman Catholic clergyman.
- Russell H. Dilday, 92, American pastor, president of the Southwestern Baptist Theological Seminary (1978–1994).
- Ali Duba, 89, Syrian intelligence officer, head of the Military Intelligence Directorate (1973–2000).
- Guillermo Escalada, 87, Uruguayan footballer (Gimnasia de La Plata, national team).
- Winnie Ewing, 93, Scottish politician, MP (1967–1970, 1974–1979), MEP (1979–1999).
- Gaea Pelefoti Failautusi, 83, American Samoan politician, senator (1995–1999). (death announced on this date)
- Warren Ford, 90, British tea researcher, complications following hip surgery.
- Daniel Fuller, 97, American theologian and academic.
- Gerald T. Hagino, 73, American politician, member of the Hawaii House of Representatives (1981–1982) and senate (1983–1994).
- Lucia Hippolito, 72, Brazilian political scientist, journalist and historian.
- Vigen Khachatryan, 71, Armenian politician, governor of Lori Province (1996–1998), MP (since 2021).
- Cedric Killings, 45, American football player (Minnesota Vikings, Washington Redskins, Houston Texans), pancreatic cancer.
- Mijo Lončarić, 81, Croatian linguist.
- Peter Makuck, 82, American poet and short story writer.
- Manny the Frenchie, 12, American French Bulldog.
- Joanne McComb, 90, American baseball player (Springfield Sallies).
- Ronnie Nolan, 89, Irish footballer (Shamrock Rovers, Bohemians, national team).
- Mario Perani, 86, Italian politician, deputy (1987–1994).
- Tom Roper, 78, Australian politician, Victoria MP (1973–1994).
- Venetia Stanley-Smith, 72, British-born Japanese herbalist, aspiration pneumonia.
- Vytautas Šustauskas, 78, Lithuanian politician, MP (2000–2004).
- Vũ Khoan, 85, Vietnamese politician, deputy prime minister (2002–2006).
- George Winterling, 91, American television meteorologist (WJXT).
- Robin F. Wynne, 70, American jurist, associate justice of the Arkansas Supreme Court (since 2014).

=== 22 ===
- Peter Allan, 87, Australian cricketer (Queensland, national team).
- Robert Black, 67, American bassist (Bang on a Can All Stars), colon cancer.
- Peter Brötzmann, 82, German jazz saxophonist.
- Cora Cohen, 79, American artist.
- Stéphane Demol, 57, Belgian footballer (Anderlecht, Porto, national team), cardiac arrest.
- Ben Heaton, 33, English rugby league player (Oldham, Halifax, Hunslet).
- Michael Horodniceanu, 78, Romanian-born American engineer, pancreatic cancer.
- Horst-Dieter Höttges, 79, German footballer (Werder Bremen, Mönchengladbach, national team), world champion (1974), European champion (1972), complications from dementia.
- Volodymyr Hryshchenko, 77, Ukrainian engineer and politician, acting mayor of Zaporizhzhia (2003).
- Jacques Ishaq, 85, Iraqi Chaldean Catholic hierarch, archbishop of Arbil (1997–1999) and curial bishop of the Chaldean Patriarchate (2005–2014).
- Harry Markowitz, 95, American economist (modern portfolio theory), Nobel Prize laureate (1990), pneumonia and sepsis.
- Mohammad Masduki, 78, Indonesian politician, mayor of Depok (1991–1992), vice governor of Banten (2007–2012).
- Roger Masters, 90, American political philosopher.
- Shyqri Nimani, 82, Albanian graphic designer.
- Della Pascoe, 74, British Olympic sprinter (1968, 1972), complications from Parkinson's disease.
- Victor Pușcaș, 79, Moldovan politician and jurist, MP (1990–1994) and president of the Constitutional Court (2001–2007).
- Marion Reid, 94, Canadian politician, MLA (1979–1989) and lieutenant governor of Prince Edward Island (1990–1995).
- Stevanus Vreeke Runtu, 64, Indonesian politician, regent of Minahasa (2003–2013).
- P. Sabanayagam, 101, Indian Administrative Service officer.
- James Shepherd, 86, English cornetist and bandleader.
- Dave Wilkes, 59, English footballer (Barnsley, Stockport County, Carlisle United).
- Zhong Xunzheng, 93, Chinese architect.

=== 23 ===
- Mohammad-Reza Ashtiani Araghi, 82, Iranian Shia cleric and politician, MP (2004–2016).
- Margia Dean, 101, American beauty queen and actress (The Quatermass Xperiment, I Shot Jesse James, The Baron of Arizona).
- Penny Ann Early, 80, American jockey and basketball player (Kentucky Colonels), suicide.
- Harold Elletson, 62, British politician, MP (1992–1997), pulmonary embolism.
- Arlette Faidiga, 84, Italian Olympic swimmer (1960).
- Frederic Forrest, 86, American actor (The Rose, The Conversation, Apocalypse Now).
- Rocky Gattellari, 81, Italian-Australian Olympic boxer (1960).
- Saundra Graham, 81, American politician, member of the Massachusetts House of Representatives (1977–1988).
- Sheldon Harnick, 99, American lyricist (Fiorello!, Fiddler on the Roof, She Loves Me) and songwriter.
- Georg Indrevik, 83, Norwegian politician, MP (2001–2009).
- Jimmy Kim, 56, American taekwondo practitioner, Olympic champion (1988), complications from dermatomyositis.
- Omer Léger, 92, American-born Canadian politician, New Brunswick MLA (1971–1987).
- Branko Lukovac, 79, Montenegrin politician, minister of foreign affairs (2000–2003).
- Jesse McReynolds, 93, American bluegrass musician (Jim & Jesse).
- Malcolm Mowbray, 74, British film director and screenwriter (A Private Function, Don't Tell Her It's Me, Sweet Revenge).
- Kunto Ojansivu, 63, Finnish actor (Elf Toljander, Sibelius, Rentun Ruusu).
- Keith Ovenden, 79, British-born New Zealand political scientist, writer, and social commentator.
- Donna Pope, 91, American politician, member of the Ohio House of Representatives (1972–1982) and director of the United States Mint (1981–1991).
- Lee Rauch, 58, American drummer (Megadeth, Dark Angel).
- Bev Risman, 85, English rugby union (national team) and league (Leigh, Leeds) player and coach.
- Paul de Senneville, 89, French composer and music producer.
- Manamourou Silikam, 49, Cameroonian politician, MP (since 2020).
- Betta St. John, 93, American actress (The Robe, Dream Wife, High Tide at Noon).
- Amy Uyematsu, 75, American poet, breast cancer.
- Peter Wiesinger, 85, Austrian philologist.
- Sergo Yeritsyan, 66, Armenian journalist and politician, MP (1995–1999).

=== 24 ===
- George Andreadis, 81, Greek Olympic sailor (1968, 1976).
- Claude Barzotti, 69, Belgian singer.
- Ian Browne, 92, Australian cyclist, Olympic champion (1956).
- Raymond Cassagnol, 102, Haitian Air Force officer.
- S. M. Cyril, 86, Irish-born Indian educator.
- Dahrran Diedrick, 44, Canadian football player (Washington Redskins, Edmonton Eskimos, Montreal Alouettes), cancer.
- Tony Halmshaw, 77, English rugby league player (Halifax, Rochdale Hornets, Great Britain national team).
- Dodie Heath, 96, American actress (Brigadoon, The Diary of Anne Frank, Seconds).
- Roefie Hueting, 93, Dutch economist and pianist.
- Margaret Irvine, 75, British crossword compiler.
- Lena Kourkoutis, 44, American physicist, colon cancer.
- Ólafur Laufdal, 78, Icelandic restaurateur and hotelier.
- James Leavey, 75, British writer, journalist and editor.
- Desmond Junaidi Mahesa, 57, Indonesian politician, MP (since 2009).
- Alain Marion, 76, Canadian sport shooter.
- Margaret McDonagh, Baroness McDonagh, 61, British politician, member of the House of Lords (since 2004), glioblastoma.
- Robert "Say" McIntosh, 79, American political activist.
- David Richards, 82, American theater critic and novelist, complications from Parkinson's disease.
- Cédric Roussel, 45, Belgian footballer (La Louvière, Coventry City, national team), heart attack.
- Dean Smith, 91, American track and field athlete, Olympic champion (1952), stuntman, and actor (Rhinestone, Creepshow 2).
- Taufa Vakatale, 85, Fijian politician, president of the Soqosoqo ni Vakavulewa ni Taukei (1999–2000).
- Gary M. Williamson, 86, American politician, member of the North Dakota House of Representatives (1965–1968).
- Rachel Yakar, 87, French soprano.
- Sir Ti-liang Yang, 93, Hong Kong jurist, chief justice (1988–1996).

=== 25 ===
- Hugo Blanco, 88, Peruvian politician and writer, MP (1978–1985, 1990–1992).
- David Bohrman, 69, American television executive (ABC News, CNN, Current TV), complications following hip surgery.
- Wilhelm Büsing, 102, German equestrian, Olympic silver medallist (1952).
- Eddie Chin, 74, Singaporean-born Malaysian-British bass guitarist (The Tourists).
- Simon Crean, 74, Australian politician and trade unionist, minister for trade (2007–2010) and the arts (2010–2013), and MP (1990–2013).
- James Crown, 70, American businessman, racing collision.
- Tapas Das, 68, Indian singer-songwriter (Moheener Ghoraguli), lung cancer.
- Karl Goddard, 55, English footballer (Bradford City, Hereford United, Bradford Park Avenue).
- John B. Goodenough, 100, American materials scientist, Nobel Prize laureate (2019).
- Elizabeth Greene, 82, Canadian Olympic alpine skier (1960).
- James W. Griffin, 89, American politician.
- Leo Insam, 48, Italian Olympic ice hockey player (1994, 1998).
- Mike Kellogg, 81, American radio broadcaster (Moody Radio) and writer.
- Dame Ann Leslie, 82, British journalist (Daily Mail).
- Richard Ravitch, 89, American businessman and politician, lieutenant governor of New York (2009–2010).
- Raj Karan Singh, 87, Indian politician, MP (1984–1989).
- José Antonio Sistiaga, 91, Spanish filmmaker.
- Edward Turay, 77, Sierra Leonean diplomat, high commissioner to the United Kingdom (since 2010).
- Peg Yorkin, 96, American philanthropist, co-founder of the Feminist Majority Foundation.
- Ján Zvonár, 72, Slovak medical doctor and politician, MP (2006–2010).

=== 26 ===
- Dharam Ablashi, 91, Indian-born American biomedical researcher.
- David Ogilvy, 13th Earl of Airlie, 97, Scottish peer, lord chamberlain (1984–1997).
- Robin Aisher, 89, British sailor, Olympic bronze medallist (1968).
- Óscar Arizaga, 65, Peruvian footballer (Atlético Chalaco, national team).
- Richard B. Bernstein, 67, American constitutional historian.
- Tom Beynon, 81, Canadian football player (Saskatchewan Roughriders, Ottawa Rough Riders), Grey Cup champion (1966, 1968, 1969).
- Dick Biondi, 90, American disc jockey.
- Tony Bouza, 94, Spanish-born American police chief.
- Craig Brown, 82, Scottish football player (Dundee) and manager (Aberdeen, national team).
- Florence Chenoweth, 78, Liberian politician and agriculture specialist, minister of agriculture (1977–1979, 2009–2015).
- John Cockbill, 83, Australian Olympic rower (1956).
- Nicolas Coster, 89, British-American actor (Santa Barbara, Another World, All the President's Men).
- C. V. Dev, 83, Indian actor (The Good Boys, Kilichundan Mampazham, Mizhi Randilum).
- Hardwar Dubey, 73, Indian politician, MP (since 2020) and Uttar Pradesh MLA (1989–1993).
- Emanuil Dyulgerov, 68, Bulgarian Olympic hammer thrower (1980).
- Raanan Gissin, 74, Israeli political scientist.
- Tom Gullick, 92, English birdwatcher and tour operator.
- Juha Hernesniemi, 75, Finnish neurosurgeon.
- Ulysses Hollimon, 92, American baseball player (Birmingham Black Barons, Baltimore Elite Giants).
- Ysabelle Lacamp, 68, French writer, singer, and actress (Je vous aime, Fire, Ice and Dynamite).
- Carroll Leavell, 86, American politician, member of the New Mexico Senate (1997–2018).
- Sanjoy K. Mitter, 89, Indian-born American electrical engineer and control theorist.
- Rob Palmer, 66, Canadian ice hockey player (Los Angeles Kings, New Jersey Devils).
- Scott Pelluer, 64, American football player (New Orleans Saints) and coach (Boise State Broncos, Washington Huskies), cardiac arrest.
- Salim Saadi, 86, Algerian politician.
- Sir Lloyd Erskine Sandiford, 86, Barbadian politician, prime minister (1987–1994).
- Vladimir Sedov, 35, Kazakh Olympic weightlifter (2008), suicide.
- Mike Spivey, 69, American football player (Chicago Bears, New Orleans Saints, Oakland Raiders).
- François Thibodeau, 83, Canadian Roman Catholic prelate, bishop of Edmundston (1994–2009).
- Max Wieczorek, 84, Canadian Olympic rower (1964).

=== 27 ===
- Peter Bieri, 79, Swiss writer and philosopher.
- Marie-Joseph Bissonnier, 82, French dental surgeon and politician, president of the General Council of Ille-et-Vilaine (2001–2004).
- Joana Brito, 76, Mexican actress (Teresa, La fuerza del destino) and voiceover artist (The Princess and the Frog).
- Monte Cazazza, 74, American artist and composer.
- Alice Cleveland, 74, American television personality (HSN).
- Jack H. Cole, 87, American politician, member of the Georgia House of Representatives (1967–1976).
- Evelyn Boyd Granville, 99, American academic.
- Dewey L. Hill, 97, American politician, member of the North Carolina House of Representatives (1992–2012).
- Graeme John, 80, Australian football player (East Perth, South Melbourne), coach and administrator.
- Anne Leahy, 97, New Zealand archaeologist.
- Avtar Lit, 73, British businessman, owner and chairman of Sunrise Radio Group.
- Italo Lupi, 89, Italian graphic designer.
- Ryan Mallett, 35, American football player (New England Patriots, Houston Texans, Baltimore Ravens), drowned.
- Nahel Merzouk, 17, French motorist, shot.
- Claude Miller, 79, Canadian Anglican bishop, metropolitan of Canada (2009–2014) and bishop of Fredericton (2003–2014).
- Lloyd John Muller, 86, Canadian politician.
- P. Chitran Namboodirippad, 103, Indian writer and educationist.
- Bobby Osborne, 91, American bluegrass musician (Osborne Brothers).
- Rudolf Pardede, 81, Indonesian businessman and politician, governor of North Sumatra (2005–2008), senator (2009–2014).
- Janie Park, 76, American biologist.
- Daniel N. Paul, 84, Canadian author (We Were Not the Savages), cancer.
- Carmen Sevilla, 92, Spanish actress (Vengeance, Don Juan, King of Kings), singer and dancer, complications from Alzheimer's disease.
- Robert Sherman, 90, American radio broadcaster (WFUV, WQXR), author, and music critic (The New York Times).
- C. V. Shivashankar, 90, Indian film director (Rathna Manjari, Mane Katti Nodu, Padavidhara), heart attack.
- Cok Budi Suryawan, 65, Indonesian politician, regent of Gianyar (1993–2003).
- Max Thompson, 66, English footballer (Blackpool, Baltimore Blast, Liverpool).
- Lilli Vincenz, 85, German-born American gay rights activist.

=== 28 ===
- Soumia Benkhaldoun, 60, Moroccan women's rights activist.
- Harland Carl, 91, American football player (Chicago Bears).
- Willie Carrick, 70, Irish football player (Luton Town, Chelmsford City) and manager (Witham Town).
- Jean-Michel Cazes, 88, French winemaker and insurance executive (AXA).
- Rabiatou Sérah Diallo, 73, Guinean trade unionist, secretary-general of the CNTG (since 2000).
- Talina Fernández, 78, Mexican television presenter and actress (Muchachita, Tenías que ser tú).
- Nina Hallowell, 65, British medical sociologist.
- Sue Johanson, 93, Canadian sex educator.
- Harry Klugmann, 82, German equestrian, Olympic bronze medallist (1972).
- William Marshall, 87, Canadian politician, Newfoundland and Labrador MHA (1970–1986).
- Corazon Nuñez Malanyaon, 73, Filipino politician, lawyer, and accountant, governor of Davao Oriental (2007–2016, since 2022), twice member of the House of Representatives.
- Iyabo Oko, 62, Nigerian actress (Ayitale).
- Jerry Okorodudu, 64, Nigerian Olympic boxer (1984), complications from a foot ulcer.
- Matt Rendell, 64, Australian footballer (West Torrens, Fitzroy, Brisbane), heart attack.
- Kenneth Riegel, 85, American opera tenor.
- Bob Shannon, 74, American radio disc jockey (WCBS-FM).
- Ralph Sutherland, 97, Canadian civil servant.
- Gary Varner, 66, American philosopher, cancer.
- Dietrich Wagner, 78, German engineer and protester (Stuttgart 21).
- Lowell Weicker, 92, American politician, member of the U.S. House of Representatives (1969–1971) and Senate (1971–1989), governor of Connecticut (1991–1995).

=== 29 ===
- Mohammad Majid Ali, 29, Pakistani snooker player, suicide.
- Alan Arkin, 89, American actor (Little Miss Sunshine, Argo, The Heart Is a Lonely Hunter), Oscar winner (2006), heart failure.
- Bea Ballintijn, 100, Norwegian Olympic swimmer (1948).
- Clarence Barlow, 77, British composer, complications from a fall.
- Inoslav Bešker, 73, Croatian-Italian journalist and academic.
- Sai Chand, 39, Indian folk singer.
- Judi Farr, 84, Australian actress (My Name's McGooley, What's Yours?, Kingswood Country, Please Like Me).
- Michael Dennis Feit, 80, American physicist.
- Dame Phyllis Guthardt, 93, New Zealand Methodist minister and women's leader, chancellor of the University of Canterbury (1998–2002).
- Gerald Hine-Haycock, 72, British broadcaster and journalist.
- Peter Horbury, 73, British car designer.
- Marty Huff, 74, American football player (San Francisco 49ers, Edmonton Eskimos, Charlotte Hornets).
- Don Kennedy, 93, American radio broadcaster (WPIC, NBC Radio), television personality, and voice actor (Space Ghost Coast to Coast).
- Christine King Farris, 95, American civil rights activist.
- Marvin Kitman, 93, American television critic (Newsday) and humorist, cancer.
- Charles T. Knight, 91, American sound engineer (Butterflies Are Free, Five Easy Pieces, Blacula).
- Jack Laub, 97, American basketball player (Minneapolis Lakers, Scranton Miners) and pharmaceutical executive.
- Betty Jane Long, 95, American politician, member of the Mississippi House of Representatives (1956–1984).
- Bob Mattson, 92, American swimmer.
- Hipólito Mora, 67, Mexican farmer and politician, shot.
- Stephen Owen, 74, Canadian politician, MP (2000–2007).
- Alysson Paolinelli, 86, Brazilian agronomic engineer, minister of agriculture (1974–1979).
- Barry Phillips-Moore, 85, Australian tennis player.
- Gary Podesto, 81, American politician, mayor of Stockton, California (1997–2005).
- Tasniya Punyagupta, 100, Thai educator, headmistress of the Chitralada School. (death announced on this date)
- Mita Rahman, 65, Bangladeshi-British actress (Doll's House), pancreatic cancer.
- Hugh Saddler, 79, Australian energy economist and writer.
- Sir Tapley Seaton, 72, Saint Kitts and Nevis politician, governor-general (2015–2023).
- Shakeel, 85, Pakistani actor (Uncle Urfi, Aangan Terha, Ankahi).
- Lilian Terry, 92, Italian jazz singer.
- Angel Wagenstein, 100, Bulgarian screenwriter (Stars, Goya or the Hard Way to Enlightenment, Eolomea).
- Anita Wood, 85, American singer and actress, pneumonia.

=== 30 ===
- Gordon Briscoe, 84, Australian academic and Aboriginal activist.
- Rudy Chmura, 91, American politician.
- Eva Maria Daniels, 43, Icelandic film producer (What Maisie Knew, Hold the Dark, Joe Bell), cancer.
- Droz, 54, American professional wrestler (WWF) and football player (Denver Broncos, Montreal Alouettes).
- Farimah Farjami, 71, Iranian actress.
- Bob Fernley, 70, British motorsport manager and businessman, bladder cancer.
- Rick Froberg, 55, American musician (Drive Like Jehu, Hot Snakes, Obits).
- Alexander Gianniris, 63, Greek Eastern Orthodox prelate, primate of the Orthodox Archdiocese of Nigeria.
- Kirk Howard, 80, Canadian book publisher (Dundurn Press).
- Ruth Anker Høyer, 78, Danish-born Norwegian jurist and women's rights leader.
- Lawrence W. Jones, 97, American physicist and academic.
- Murat Karagöz, 55, Turkish diplomat, ambassador to Mongolia (2013–2016), Jordan (2016–2019), and Portugal (since 2023), heart attack.
- Michael Kauffmann, 92, English art historian.
- Laird Koenig, 95, American author (The Little Girl Who Lives Down the Lane) and screenwriter (Bloodline, Inchon).
- Józef Kozioł, 84, Polish politician and economist, MP (1985–1989), deputy prime minister (1985–1988) and minister of the environmental protection and natural resources (1988–1989).
- Jo Lindner, 30, German bodybuilder, aneurysm.
- Lord Creator, 87, Trinidadian-born Jamaican singer-songwriter ("Kingston Town").
- Carlos Alberto Montaner, 80, Cuban-born Spanish writer, neurodegenerative illness.
- Micere Githae Mugo, 81, Kenyan playwright and poet.
- Vahidin Musemić, 76, Bosnian footballer (Sarajevo, Nice, Yugoslavia national team).
- Gail North-Saunders, 79, Bahamian historian.
- Ron Pretty, 82, Australian poet.
- Bir Devinder Singh, 73, Indian politician, deputy speaker of the Punjab Legislative Assembly (2003–2004), cancer.
- Valentina Zazdravnykh, 68, Russian field hockey player, Olympic bronze medallist (1980).
