= Robert Munn =

Robert Munn may refer to:

- Robert Stewart Munn (1829–1894), Scottish-born merchant and politician in Newfoundland
- Robert Munn (rower) (born 1990), American rower
- R. E. Munn (1919–2013, Robert Edward Munn), Canadian climatologist and meteorologist

== See also ==
- Bob Munn (1939–2023), Australian rules footballer
