= Gary Williamson =

Gary Williamson may refer to:

- Gary Williamson (footballer) (1941–2009), Australian rules footballer for Richmond and South Melbourne
- Gary Williamson (ice hockey) (born 1950), Canadian former World Hockey Association forward
- Gary M. Williamson (1936–2023), member of the North Dakota House of Representatives
- Gary Williamson, Canadian politician elected in the Wellington County municipal elections, 2010
- Gary Williamson, contestant who appeared as Tony Christie on a 2000 episode of Stars in Their Eyes
- Gary Williamson, drummer with the Australian rock band The Zorros
- Gary Williamson, production designer and British Independent Film Awards 2009 nominee
