= Eypeltauer =

Eypeltauer is a surname of Austrian origin. Notable people with the surname include:

- Beatrix Eypeltauer (1929–2023), Austrian lawyer and politician
- Felix Eypeltauer (born 1992), Austrian politician

== See also ==
- Eype
