= Leavey =

Leavey is a surname. Notable people with the surname include:

- Dorothy Leavey (1897–1998), American philanthropist
- Herbert Leavey (1886–1954), English footballer known as John Leavey
- James Leavey (1947–2023), British writer and journalist
- Maria Leavey (1954–2006), American political consultant
- Megan Leavey (born 1983), former US Marine and subject of the film Megan Leavey
- Nick Leavey (born 1986), British sprinter
- Thomas E. Leavey (1897–1980), American philanthropist
- Tony Leavey (1915–1999), British businessman and politician

== See also ==
- Leavey Center, indoor basketball arena in Santa Clara, California, United States
