= Libya–Norway relations =

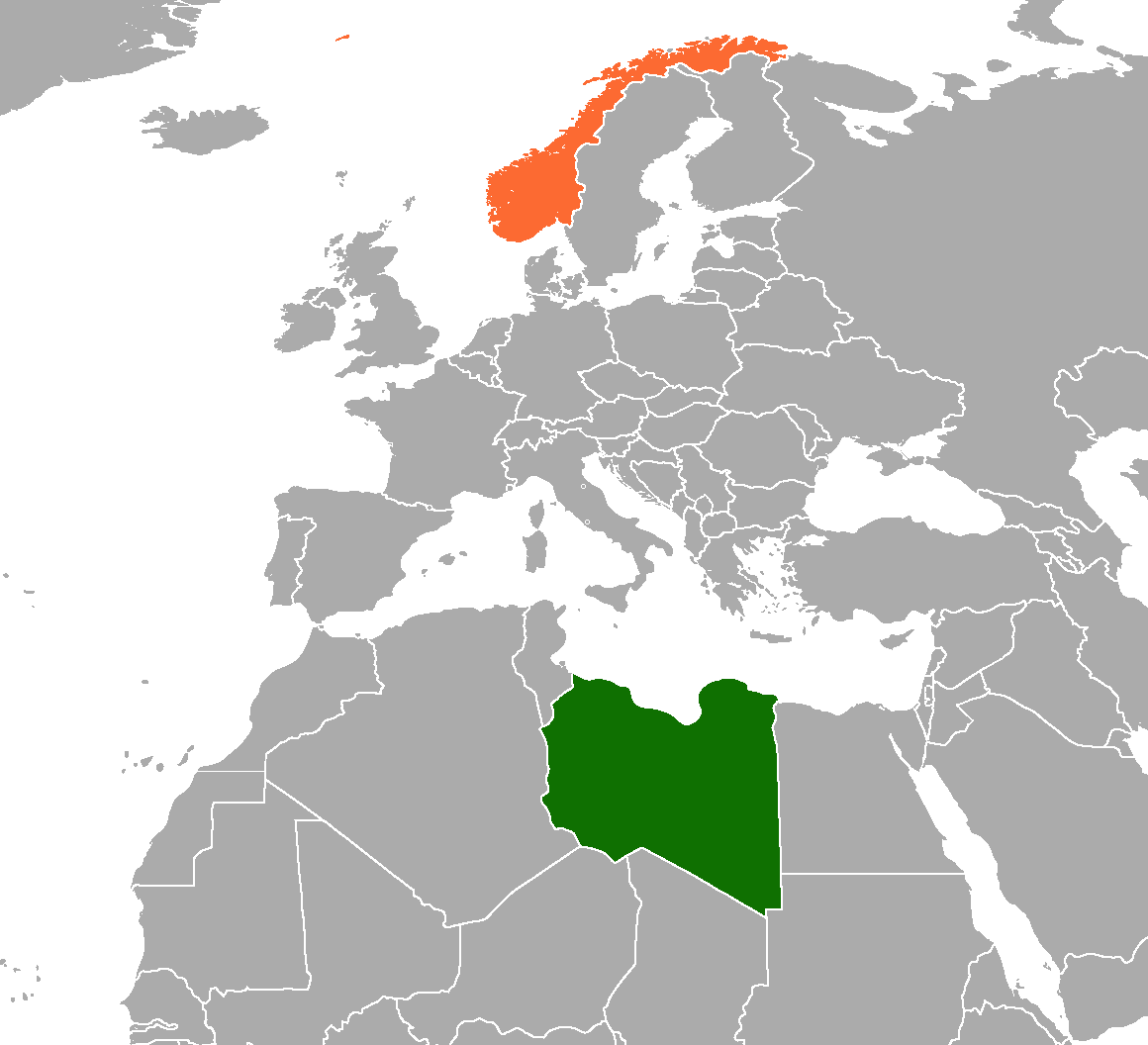

- Libya: Norway

Libya–Norway relations are the bilateral and diplomatic relations between Libya and Norway. While neither country has an embassy in the other—Libya has its closest embassy in Stockholm, whereas Norway has an embassy in Cairo—the economic relations have been more significant. Notably, Norway also took part in the bombing campaign against Libya in 2011.

After the 1986 United States bombing of Libya, the Norwegian Prime Minister, Minister of Foreign Affairs and Permanent Representative to NATO voiced concern over the US choice to attack the African country. However Norway did not condemn the action. In 2011, Norwegian F-16s took part in Nato's Operation Unified Protector and conducted bombing runs on Libya from a base in Crete. 588 bombs were dropped during these raids.

Norway operates a consulate in Tripoli.

Norwegian and Libyan interests have both made economic investments in the opposite country. Since both countries have major petroleum sectors, Libya granted licenses to Saga Petroleum in the 1990s. Following business mergers, the licenses were transferred to Norsk Hydro, then Statoil. Norsk Hydro's fertilizer division, which split and became Yara International, also invested in Libya, becoming co-owners of the Lifeco mineral fertilizer plant in 2009.

In 2011, four Yara executives were indicted on corruption charges relating to corruption in Libya and India. They were the CEO Thorleif Enger and the executives Daniel Clauw, Tor Holba and Ken Wallace. Thorleif Enger was convicted of corruption by the District Court in the summer of 2015, but fully acquitted in December 2016. In the end, three of the four except for Wallace were acquitted of corruption in both Libya and India. In 2021, the Court of Appeal ruled that Enger receive reparations of 9.27 million kr.

== See also ==
- Foreign relations of Libya
- Foreign relations of Norway
