= Ólafur Laufdal =

Icelandic restaurateur (1944–2023)

Ólafur Laufda
- Born: Ólafur Grétar Laufdal Jónsson; 10 August 1944; Vestmannaeyjar, Iceland
- Died: 10 June 2023 (aged 78)
- Occupations: Hotelier, restaurateur
- Years active: 1956–2023

Ólafur Grétar Laufdal Jónsson (10 August 1944 – 24 June 2023) was an Icelandic restaurateur and hotelier. He is best known for his restaurants Hollywood and Broadway and the five-star Hótel Grímsborgir.

== Life and career ==
Ólafur started working in the restaurant business at the age of 12, first at Hótel Borg. After completing his studies at the Hotel and Catering School he worked at Hótel Saga and then on the passenger ship MV Gullfoss as a bartender. Ólafur worked at Glaumbær until it burned down in 1971 and then at Óðal, where he became a co-owner. He later bought a restaurant in Ármúla called Cesar in 1978 and changed its name to Hollywood.

Laufdal died on 24 June 2023, at the age of 78.
