= Valentin Tatarchuk =

Russian politician (1937–2023)

Member of the State Duma
- In office 11 January 1994 – 15 January 1996

Personal details
- Born: Valentin Ivanovich Tatarchuk; 28 September 1937 Dnipropetrovsk, Ukrainian SSR, USSR
- Died: 7 June 2023 (aged 85) Moscow, Russia
- Party: DVR
- Education: Leningrad Forestry Academy
- Occupation: Engineer

Valentin Ivanovich Tatarchuk (Russian: Валентин Иванович Татарчук; 28 September 1937 – 7 June 2023) was a Russian engineer and politician. A member of the Democratic Choice of Russia, he served in the State Duma from 1994 to 1996.

Tatarchuk died in Moscow on 7 June 2023, at the age of 85.
