= Carlos Gamou =

Uruguayan politician (1959–2023)

Member of the Chamber of Representatives of Uruguay
- In office 15 February 2005 – 14 February 2015
- In office 15 February 1995 – 14 February 2000

Personal details
- Born: 9 August 1959
- Died: 9 June 2023 (aged 63)
- Party: FA
- Occupation: Political scientist

Carlos Gamou (9 August 1959 – 9 June 2023) was a Uruguayan political scientist and politician. A member of the Broad Front, he served in the Chamber of Representatives from 1995 to 2000 and again from 2005 to 2015.

Gamou died on 9 June 2023, at the age of 63.
