= Liu Shouren =

Chinese engineer (1934–2023)

- 刘守仁
- Born: 21 March 1934; Jingjiang, Jiangsu, China
- Died: 11 June 2023 (aged 89); Shihezi, Xinjiang, China
- Education: Nanjing Agricultural University
- Scientific career
- Fields: Wool
- Workplaces: Xinjiang Agriculture Academy

Chinese name
- Simplified Chinese: 刘守仁
- Traditional Chinese: 劉守仁
Transcriptions
Standard Mandarin
- Hanyu Pinyin: Liú Shǒurén

Liu Shouren (Chinese: 刘守仁; 21 March 1934 – 11 June 2023) was a Chinese engineer specializing in wool, and an academician of the Chinese Academy of Engineering. He has been hailed as the "Father of Chinese Fine Wool Sheep".

Liu was a representative of the 12th National Congress of the Chinese Communist Party and 13th National Congress of the Chinese Communist Party. He was a delegate to the 9th and 10th National People's Congress.

== Biography ==
Liu was born in the town of Gushan, Jingjiang, Jiangsu, on 21 March 1934. His father was an engineer at a textile factory in the Suzhou. He had six sisters. He attended Jingjiang Xiyin Middle School (靖江惜阴中学) and Wu County High School (吴县高中). In 1951, he enrolled at Zhejiang University. In 1952, the Animal Husbandry Department of Zhejiang University was incorporated into Nanjing Agricultural College (now Nanjing Agricultural University), and Liu became a student of Nanjing Agricultural University.

After university in 1955, with the support of his father, he signed up to support the construction of Xinjiang Production and Construction Corps and engaged in animal husbandry for a long time, and successively served as a technician, manager, and chief animal husbandry officer. He joined the Chinese Communist Party (CCP) in June 1960. He rose to become president of Xinjiang Agriculture Academy in 1988, and then honorary president in 1995. In January 2000, he was hired as a professor and doctoral supervisor of Shihezi University.

Liu died in Shihezi, Xinjiang on 11 June 2023, at the age of 89.

== Honours and awards ==
- 1987 State Science and Technology Progress Award (First Class) for the Breeding of New Chinese Merino Sheep Varieties.
- 1991 State Science and Technology Progress Award (First Class) for the Chinese Merino Sheep (Xinjiang Military Reclamation Type) Breeding System.
- 1999 Member of the Chinese Academy of Engineering (CAE)
- 2007 State Science and Technology Progress Award (Second Class) for the New Techniques for Sheep Breeding: Cultivation of New Strains of Merino Meat, Ultra Fine Wool, and Multi Fetal Meat in China.
- 2008 Science and Technology Innovation Award of the Ho Leung Ho Lee Foundation
