= Mario Perani =

Italian politician (1936–2023)

Mario Perani (30 October 1936 – 21 June 2023) was an Italian politician who served as a Deputy.
