= Ahn Yeong-gi =

South Korean politician (1936–2023)

Member of the National Assembly of South Korea
- In office 30 May 1988 – 29 May 1992

Personal details
- Born: 5 May 1936
- Died: 9 June 2023 (aged 87)
- Party: DJP; DLP
- Occupation: Doctor

Ahn Yeong-gi (Korean: 안영기; 5 May 1936 – 9 June 2023) was a South Korean doctor and politician. A member of the Democratic Justice Party and later the Democratic Liberal Party, he served in the National Assembly from 1988 to 1992.

Ahn died on 9 June 2023, at the age of 87.
