= Robert Rigot =

French sculptor (1929–2023)

- Born: 14 September 1929; Buxy, France
- Died: 1 June 2023 (aged 93); Chalon-sur-Saône, France
- Education: Beaux-Arts de Paris
- Occupation: Sculptor

Robert Rigot (French: [ʁɔbɛʁ ʁiɡo]; 14 September 1929 – 1 June 2023) was a French sculptor.

== Biography ==
Born in Buxy on 14 September 1929, Rigot grew up in a family of stonecutters, where he developed his talents prior to his admission to the Beaux-Arts de Paris. In 1954, he received the Prix de Rome for a sculpture of a mythological figure. He was a boarding student at the Villa Medici from 1955 to 1959, where he took an interest in other materials used for sculptures.

Rigot developed his ability for sculpting out of bronze, for which he used welding equipment. Using these skills, he collaborated with multiple architects to put together the Hommage à Eiffel in Dijon. From 1966 to 1996, he was an artistic councilor for Baccarat. He was awarded the Grand Prize from the Council of Europe for his crystal works in 1990. He was also a corresponding member of the Institut de France.

Rigot died in Chalon-sur-Saône on 1 June 2023, at the age of 93.
