= Leon Kovalsky =

Russian politician (1940–2023)

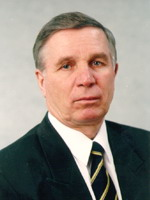
- Kovalsky in 2008

Member of the Federation Council of Russia
- In office 23 January 1996 – 25 January 2006
- Preceded by: Vasily Tarasenko
- Succeeded by: Valery Parfenov

Chairman of the Samara Regional Duma
- In office 1994–2001
- Preceded by: position established
- Succeeded by: Viktor Sazonov

Personal details
- Born: Leon Iosifovich Kovalsky; 28 April 1940 Monastirok, Dzerzhinsky District, Zhytomyr Oblast, Ukrainian SSR, USSR
- Died: 4 June 2023 (aged 83) Samara, Russia
- Party: CPSU (until 1991); NDR
- Education: Volgograd State Agricultural University
- Occupation: Engineer

Leon Iosifovich Kovalsky (Russian: Леон Иосифович Ковальский; 28 April 1940 – 4 June 2023) was a Russian engineer politician. A member of Our Home – Russia, he served in the Federation Council from 1996 to 2006 and was Chairman of the Samara Regional Duma from 1994 to 2001.

Kovalsky died in Samara on 4 June 2023, at the age of 83.
