= Sharari al-Shakhanbeh =

Jordanian politician (1942–2023)

Member of the Senate of Jordan
- In office 27 September 2020 – 30 October 2022

Minister of Agriculture
- In office 24 October 2004 – 5 April 2005
- Succeeded by: Youssef al-Sharqi

Personal details
- Born: 1 September 1941 Al Judayyidah, Transjordan
- Died: 4 June 2023 (aged 80) Amman, Jordan
- Party: Independent
- Education: Palestine Technical University – Kadoorie; Beirut Arab University

Sharari al-Shakhanbeh (Arabic: شراري الشخانبة; 1 September 1942 – 4 June 2023) was a Jordanian politician. An independent, he served as Minister of Agriculture from 2004 to 2005 and was a Senator from 2020 to 2022. Al-Shakhanbeh died in Amman on 4 June 2023, at the age of 80.
