= Lena Kourkoutis =

American physicist (1979 – 2023)

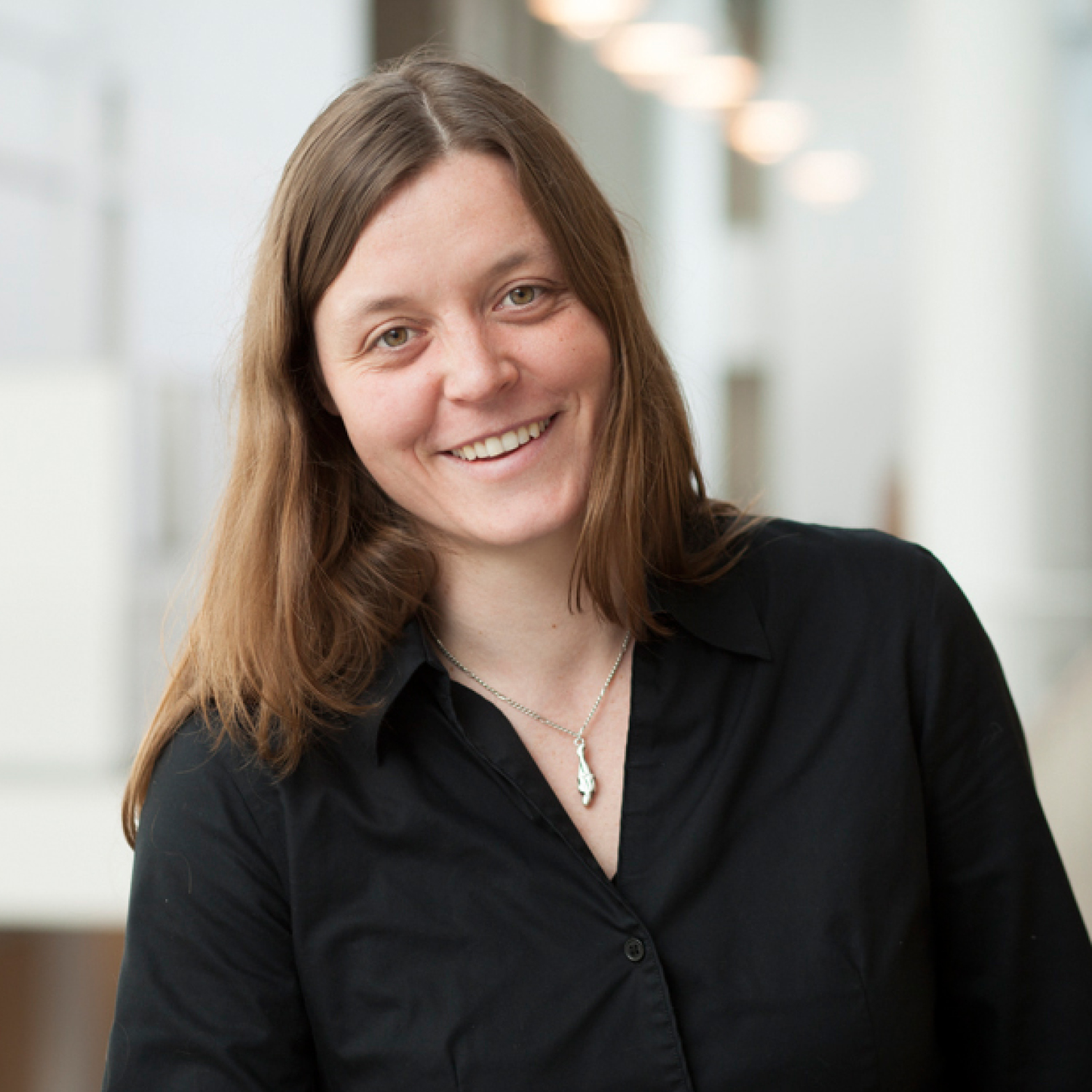
- Born: June 6, 1979
- Died: June 24, 2023 (aged 44)
- Education: Cornell University; University of Rostock
- Known for: Electron Microscopy
- Scientific career
- Workplaces: Cornell University
- Website: Kourkoutis Electron Microscopy Group

Lena Fitting Kourkoutis (June 6, 1979 – June 24, 2023) was an American physicist working in the field of electron microscopy, and a professor of applied and engineering physics at Cornell University. Her research focused on the use of aberration-corrected scanning transmission electron microscope, providing atomic resolution, at cryogenic temperatures (>77K) to study physical processes such as superconductivity and biological structures such as proteins.

== Education and career ==
Kourkoutis received her Diplom in Physics from the University of Rostock, in Germany in 2003, and conducted her doctoral research at Cornell University, which she completed in 2009. She then moved back to Germany as a Humboldt Research Fellow at the Max Planck Institute in Martinsried between 2011 and 2012, before returning to Cornell University in 2013, first as a postdoctoral fellow, before joining the faculty.

In 2016, Kourkoutis was named as one of the recipients of the Presidential Early Career Award for Scientists and Engineers.

== Death ==
Kourkoutis died on June 24, 2023, aged 44, after a two-year battle with colon cancer.

== Awards and honors ==
- 2023 Fellow of the American Association for the Advancement of Science
- 2022 Fellow of the American Physical Society
- 2020 Kurt Heinrich Awards of the Microanalysis Society
- 2018 Burton Medal from the Microscopy Society of America
- 2016 Presidential Early Career Award for Scientists and Engineers
- 2014 Packard Fellowship for Science and Engineering
- 2013 Albert Crewe Award
