= Titus Okere =

Nigerian footballer (1929–2023)

Titus Okere // (22 March 1929 – 14 June 2023) was a Nigerian footballer who was selected as a member of the "U.K. tourists", a touring team that represented Nigeria in 1949. In the U.K., the team played matches with English amateur clubs and later played an international match against Sierra Leone, with Okere scoring one of the goals in a 2–0 victory.

== Life ==
Okere was born on 22 March 1929 in Ngor Okpala local Government in Owerri, Imo State. He attended St. Cyprian’s Anglican School, Port Harcourt, Kalabari National College and the Okrika Grammar School. During a tour of Azikiwe's athletic club, Okere impressed Azikiwe and he briefly played for ZAC (Zik's Athletic Club) Port Harcourt before leaving for Lagos to join Lagos Railways. Okere captained Railways in 1948 during a successful period where they won trophies. He then moved to Swindon Town F.C. in the U.K, but his stay there was not successful. However, he captained the Nigeria national team against Gold Coast in 1951. He settled in Kent, England in 1953.

Okere died on 14 June 2023, at the age of 94.

== Sources ==
- Boer, Wiebe Karl (2003). Nation building exercise: Sporting culture and the rise of football in colonial Nigeria (Thesis). Yale University.
