= Adriano Mazzoletti =

Italian musicologist (1935–2023)

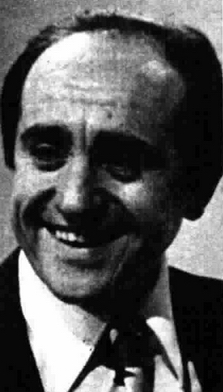
- Mazzoletti in 1973
- Born: 19 June 1935; Genoa, Italy
- Died: 18 June 2023 (aged 87); Rome, Italy

Adriano Emilio Mazzoletti (19 June 1935 – 18 June 2023) was an Italian musicologist, radio writer, and presenter.

== Life and career ==
Born in Genoa, in the 1950s Mazzoletti moved to Perugia, where he founded the jazz club which originated the Umbria Jazz Festival and organized important jazz concerts with notable figures such as Louis Armstrong. In 1957 he was employed by RAI, in which he worked as writer and radio host of programs about jazz, starting from L'angolo del jazz.

Mazzoletti wrote several books about the history of Italian jazz; his book Il jazz in Italia dalle origini alle grandi orchestre has been described as a "work of monumental scope" and a "cornerstone in the cultural and musical history" of Italy. He was editor of several jazz-themed magazines, and served as artistic director of numerous music festivals. He served as president of the Jazz and Pop Music Department of the European Broadcasting Union.

Mazzoletti died in Rome on 18 June 2023, one day before his 88th birthday.
