= Jack Earls =

American country and rockabilly singer (1932–2023)

Jack Earls (August 23, 1932 – June 12, 2023) was an American country and rockabilly singer.

== Personal background ==
Jack Earls was born in Woodbury, Tennessee on August 23, 1932. He grew up on a farm in Manchester, Tennessee in a family of seven children. He sang as a child and began playing guitar at 16; at 17 he moved to Memphis and formed his first band there in 1949. In 1950, he married and had children, and his music-making was temporarily sidelined. Earls died on June 12, 2023, at the age of 90.

== Career ==
The traditional folk song Crawdad Hole performed by Jack Earls and the Jimbos (1956).

In 1954, he formed a new band featuring guitarist Johnny Black (Bill Black's brother). This band recorded a demo at Sam Phillips's recording studio in mid-1955, "A Fool For Lovin' You" (written by Earls himself). Phillips expressed interest but told him he'd need to find a new backing band. Earls had Black move to upright bass, and Warren Gregory took up lead guitar; Danny Wahlquist joined on drums. Their next recording session for Phillips resulted in the songs "Slow Down" and "Hey Jim". Phillips released "Slow Down" on his own Sun Records under the name Jack Earls & the Jimbos, and the song became a regional hit, though Earls was unable to tour behind the record due to family obligations. Earls recorded several further songs for Sun, but none of them were released until many years later.

Earls' contract with Sun expired in what he says to be around September 1966, and despite being contacted by Meteor and King, Earls declined to record, though he did occasionally perform in Memphis until he and his family moved to Detroit in 1963. There he worked for Chrysler Motors, taking a job working as a truck driver. He recorded a few further singles in the 1970s for Olympic Records, none of which attracted attention at the time but have since been re-released on Bear Family Records.

In the 1990s, Earls noted the growing interest in rockabilly in Europe, and traveled to England, where he became a star on the country revival circuit. Subsequently his output was re-released on Bear Family Records, and he toured Europe and America into the 2000s.

== Recordings ==
Year	Title	Record label
1956	Slow Down / A Fool For Lovin’ You	Sun Records
1975	She Sure Can Rock Me / Crawdad Hole	Olympic Records
1976	Roll Over Beethoven / Take Me To That Place	Olympic Records
1976	Call Me Shorty / Mississippi Man	Olympic Records
1976	Flip Flop and Fly / Rock Bop	Olympic Records
1998	My Little Mama / Game Of Love	Enviken Records
2001	Take Me To That Place / Come On Little Mama (with Ray Harris)	Norton Records
1999	EP: Slow Down; Rock Bop; Be-Bop-A-Lula; I Started Rockin’ A Long Time Ago	Stomper Time Records
