= Panagiotis Hadjinikolaou =

Greek politician (1932–2023)

Member of the Hellenic Parliament for Evros
- In office 17 November 1974 – 24 August 1996

Personal details
- Born: 14 November 1932 Orestiada, Greece
- Died: 11 June 2023 (aged 90) Athens, Greece
- Party: ERE; ND
- Occupation: Dentist

Panagiotis Hadjinikolaou (Greek: Παναγιώτης Χατζηνικολάου; 14 November 1932 – 11 June 2023) was a Greek dentist and politician. A member of New Democracy political party, he served in the Hellenic Parliament from 1974 to 1996.

Hadjinikolaou died in Athens on 11 June 2023, at the age of 90.
