= Alan Dowding =

Australian cricketer (1929–2023)

Personal information
- Full name: Alan Lorimer Dowding
- Born: 4 April 1929; Unley, South Australia
- Died: 8 June 2023 (aged 94); Chipping Norton, Oxfordshire, England
- Batting: Right-handed
- Role: Batsman

Domestic team information
- Years: Team
- 1951–1953: Oxford University
- 1952–1953: Commonwealth XI
- 1954–1956: Free Foresters
- 1955–1956: MCC

Career statistics
Competition	First-class
Matches	43
Runs scored	1,950
Batting average	28.67
100s/50s	2/13
Top score	105
Balls bowled	195
Wickets	1
Bowling average	116.00
5 wickets in innings	0
10 wickets in match	0
Best bowling	1/4
Catches/stumpings	27/–
- Source: CricketArchive, 22 May 2023

Alan Lorimer Dowding (4 April 1929 – 8 June 2023) was an Australian first-class cricketer who played for Oxford University, the Marylebone Cricket Club (MCC), the Commonwealth XI and Free Foresters. He became a schoolteacher.

== Life and career ==
Dowding gave up a promising Australian rules football career when he was awarded a Rhodes Scholarship and moved to England. A South Australian representative at the 1948 Perth Amateur Carnival, Dowding was also league footballer with Sturt. He studied at Balliol College while at Oxford University and had previously attended St Peter's College and the University of Adelaide back home.

From 1951 to 1953, Dowding was a regular fixture in the Oxford University cricket team, usually as a number five batsman but also batting in the top order. In just his third first-class appearance, Dowding scored 105 against Nottinghamshire. He made it back to back centuries when he made 103 not out in a win over Free Foresters in his very next match.

His performances in 1952 were mixed, but he did score 69 against India. In 1952 he also played two first-class matches for the Commonwealth XI and again batted well against India, with a first innings 54 and 35 in the second.

Appointed Oxford captain in 1953, Dowding led the team in 14 first-class fixtures, including a match with the touring Australian team. He came close to scoring a century against Yorkshire but was bowled by Ray Illingworth for 99.

He played for both Free Foresters and the MCC from 1954 to 1956. He made just four half centuries from total of ten matches during that time, although his average in 1956 was a decent 44. While playing with the MCC in what would be his second last first-class match, Dowding took the only wicket of his career when he caught and bowled Cambridge opener Bob Barber. He was only bowling because Cambridge were chasing a small fourth-innings score, and his three balls also including the winning runs, off the bat of Ted Dexter.

Dowding married Jennifer Hughes in Aldingbourne, Sussex, in August 1954. He became a schoolteacher. He was a master at Radley College from 1969 to 1994. He died on 8 June 2023, at the age of 94.
