= Kiyomi Hayama =

Japanese choreographer

- 羽山 紀代美
- Born: 11 January 1945
- Died: 10 June 2023 (aged 78)
- Occupations: Choreographer; actress
- Employer: Takarazuka Music School
- Awards: Kikuta Kazuo Theater Prize Special Award (2006)

Kiyomi Hayama (Japanese: 羽山 紀代美, Hepburn: Hayama Kiyomi; 11 January 1945 – 10 June 2023) was a Japanese choreographer and stage actress. After spending more than a decade at the Takarazuka Revue as a musumeyaku actress, she returned there as a choreographer for their productions.

== Biography ==
Kiyomi Hayama, a native of Osaka, was born on 11 January 1945 and educated at Takarazuka Music School. After graduating from the Takarazuka Revue's 47th class (along with future First Lady Miyuki Hatoyama), she was part of the Revue from 1961 until 1973, serving as a Star Troupe musumeyaku.

In 1975, she returned to the Takarazuka Revue as a choreographer for their stage plays, remaining there until 2023. On 6 June 2005, the Revue held Golden Steps, a thirtieth anniversary commemoration event in Hayama's honour. Reviewing the Takarazuka Revue Cosmos Troupe's November 2010 performance of For Whom the Bell Tolls, Nekomaru Sakasegawa said that Hayama's "choreography brought out the coolness of the otokoyaku to the fullest, leading to a flowing duet dance with Sumika Nono". In addition to her work as a choreographer, she taught at Takarazuka Music School and in 1997 was appointed a trustee for the Revue.

She and composer Kenji Yoshizaki won the 2006 Kikuta Kazuo Theater Prize Special Award "for long-standing musical achievements in the Takarazuka Revue". In 2014, she was inducted into the Takarazuka Revue Hall of Fame.

Hayama died on 10 June 2023 at the age of 78. Golden Steps: 1975–2005, a commemoration television special as part of Wowow's Takarazuka e no Shōtai programme, aired on 28 October 2023.

== Filmography (as choreographer) ==
- Koi koso Waga Inochi (1975)
- Elizabeth: Ai to Shi no Rinbu (1996)
- Ōke ni Sasagu Uta (2003)
- Utakata no Koi/Enchantement (2023)
