= Muntik Nang Maabot ang Langit =

Philippine drama film

- Directed by: Manuel "Fyke" Cinco
- Written by: Humilde "Meek" Roxas
- Produced by: Orly Ilacad
- Starring: Jennifer Mendoza; Tonton Gutierrez; Patrick Guzman
- Cinematography: Edmund Cupcupin
- Edited by: Edmund "Bot" Jarlego
- Music by: Sunny Ilacad
- Production company: OctoArts Films
- Distributed by: OctoArts Films
- Release date: August 23, 1995
- Running time: 110 minutes
- Country: Philippines
- Language: Filipino

Muntik Nang Maabot ang Langit (transl.Almost Reaching Heaven) is a 1995 Philippine drama film directed by Manuel "Fyke" Cinco. The film stars Jennifer Mendoza in her first leading role, along with Tonton Gutierrez and Patrick Guzman. It is named after True Faith's hit song.

== Plot ==
Jenny is a young college girl who grows up under the care of Dona Josefa, her domineering and pious grandmother. Seeing her group of friends being allowed by their respective families to party and have boyfriends developed her insecurity towards life. She seeks help from her adoptive brother Ben to help her escape her cloistered life for one night of fun with friends at a swimming party. At the party, she meets Brando whom she loses her virginity to at the resort. That chance encounter changed Jenny's life forever. Ben knew what happened but promised to keep everything a secret to their grandmother.

However, some secrets are not kept forever. Soon after Jenny's grandmother finds out what happened and severely punishes her. Ben comes to the rescue and takes Jenny away from their home. Ben and Jenny would live together in one roof as husband and wife in a faraway town. Jenny gets a job as a sales clerk at a furniture shop where she meets Brando once more. Fearing for her safety, she avoids Brando who pursues her since he was not able to forget what happened between them. With the help of his friends Gardo and Mario, he succeeds in kidnapping Jenny and raped her on the night she was to celebrate her birthday with Ben. When she came home already beaten and bruised, Ben gets mad at the situation and destroys everything at their house. Soon after, he was able to catch Brando's whereabouts and they had a duel, with him eventually killing Brando. Because of his actions, he was sent to jail.

Years after Ben was released on parole, he planned to go back to his former grandmother's house to see if Jenny had returned. However he was surprised to see Jenny at the town plaza with a child tagging alongside her. Initially he thought the kid was the love child of Jenny with Brando due to the previous incident. But Jenny insisted that Ben is the father, since she revealed that something happened to them before the night she was kidnapped and raped by Brando. Upon hearing Jenny's revelation, Ben apologizes to her for the wrong accusations he threw at her. Jenny forgives but later on goes back to her grandmother's house with her child.

== Cast ==
- Jennifer Mendoza as Jenny
  - Nicole Anderson as Young Jenny
- Tonton Gutierrez as Ben
  - Beneth Ignacio as Young Ben
- Patrick Guzman as Brando
- Charito Solis as Doña Josefa Aquino
- Jean Saburit as Aling Luming
- Shirley Fuentes as Linda
- Brando Legaspi as Gardo
- True Faith as Themselves
- Marco Polo Garcia as Mario
- Lucita Soriano as Linda's Mother
