= Grégor Marchand =

French academic and archeologist (1968–2023)

- Born: 20 January 1968
- Died: 1 June 2023 (aged 55)
- Education: Paris-Sorbonne University; Paris 1 Panthéon-Sorbonne University
- Occupations: Archeologist; Professor

Grégor Marchand (20 January 1968 – 1 June 2023) was a French academic and archeologist. He specialized in prehistory and lithic technology. He served as a research director for the French National Centre for Scientific Research (CNRS) and was a professor at the University of Rennes 1.

== Biography ==
Born on 20 January 1968, Marchand finished his thesis, titled La néolithisation de l’ouest de la France, under the direction of Jean-Paul Demoule at Paris 1 Panthéon-Sorbonne University. He began working for the CNRS in 2000, where he specialized in archeomalacology, and received the CNRS bronze medal in 2006. At the same time, he was a professor at the University of Rennes 1.

Marchand directed multiple programs and excavations surrounding the Atlantic, namely the Retzian, the Téviec, and other areas during the Mesolithic period. Through his specializing in lithic technology, he explored uncommon geographic areas. In his thesis, he explored radical economic and technological changes during the paleoclimatic periods which saw rapid rises and falls in sea levels.

Marchand wrote numerous articles in scholarly journals. He also published summary works intended for a wider audience. His blog was intended to provide up-to-date information concerning the Mesolithic and the Neolithic periods in western France. He appeared in numerous public broadcasts with the Institut national de recherches archéologiques préventives.

Grégor Marchand died on 1 June 2023, at the age of 55.

== Publications ==
- La Neolithisation de l'ouest De La France: Caractérisation Des Industries Lithiques (1999)
- Les zones de contact Mésolithique/Néolithique dans l'ouest de la France : définition et implications (2003)
- Unité et diversité des processus de néolithisation sur la façade atlantique de l’Europe (6e-4e millénaires avant J.-C.) (2005)
- La disparition des chasseurs-cueilleurs (2008)
- Gallia Préhistoire, N° 51, 2009 : Préhistoire de la France dans son contexte européen (2009)
- Des feux dans la vallée : Les habitats du Mésolithique et du Néolithique récent à l'Essart à Poitiers (Vienne) (2009)
- Le Mésolithique en France. Archéologie des derniers chasseurs-cueilleurs (2010)
- Roches et sociétés de la Préhistoire : Entre massifs cristallins et bassins sédimentaires (2012)
- Préhistoire atlantique. Fonctionnement et évolution des sociétés du paléolithique au néolithique (2014)
