= Naum Prifti =

Albanian writer (1932–2023)

- Born: 7 March 1932; Rehovë, Kolonjë, Korçë County, Albania
- Died: 17 June 2023 (aged 91); New York City, U.S.
- Occupation: Writer

Naum Prifti (7 March 1932 – 17 June 2023) was an Albanian writer, screenwriter and playwright.

== Life and career ==
Born in Rehovë, a village in Korçë County, Prifti graduated in medicine at the Tirana Polytechnic and worked in a sanatorium. A fiction writer from an early age, he subsequently decided to enroll in literary studies at the University of Tirana. In his literary career he spanned various genres, including novels, short stories, essays, plays, screenplays and children's literature. He also served as professor of Albanian Literature in his alma mater, and collaborated with various publications. In 1991, he moved to the United States, where he served as chairman of the Albanian-American Writers' Association and as secretary of the Vatra Federation.

During his career, Prifti received various awards and honours, including the "Naim Frashëri" Title, 2nd class and the Medal of Labour.

== Death ==
He died on 17 June 2023, at the age of 91.
