= Robert "Say" McIntosh =

American activist (1943–2023)

- Born: Robert Robinson McIntosh; 1943; Mississippi
- Died: June 24, 2023
- Education: Horace Mann High School (did not graduate)
- Occupations: Former restaurant owner; Civil rights activist
- Political party: Democrat (briefly Republican)

Robert Robinson McIntosh (1943 – June 24, 2023), known as Robert "Say" McIntosh, was an American political and civil rights activist from Little Rock, Arkansas.

McIntosh was born in Mississippi in 1943. Growing up in a family of 11 children, the family eventually moved to Little Rock, Arkansas. McIntosh dropped out of high school, then started his own restaurant that was known for its sweet potato pies and eventually inspired a pie-eating contest.

He was known for his philanthropic work in Arkansas, including a Black Santa Claus program that gave free toys to lower-income children. Recognized for his work, the governor at the time, David Pryor, declared Christmas 1976 to be "Robert 'Say' McIntosh Day".

He was given the nickname "say" because he was known for speaking up about issues. In 1981, to protest racism, he attached himself to a cross, nearly resulting in his death. Also in protest of racism, he attempted to cut down a tree dedicated to Martin Luther King, Jr.

In 1990, he assaulted a candidate for lieutenant governor who he thought had links to white supremacy. He was vehemently opposed to Bill Clinton, and participated in passing out flyers accusing Clinton of having an illegitimate child.

In 1996, he assaulted a CNN reporter who was reporting on the Whitewater controversy, and was sentenced to eight months in jail, serving 73 days.

McIntosh became ill later in life with severe diabetes. He died on June 23, 2023, at the age of 79.
