= Juan Alfredo Biaggi Lama =

Dominican jurist, academic and essayist (1951–2023)

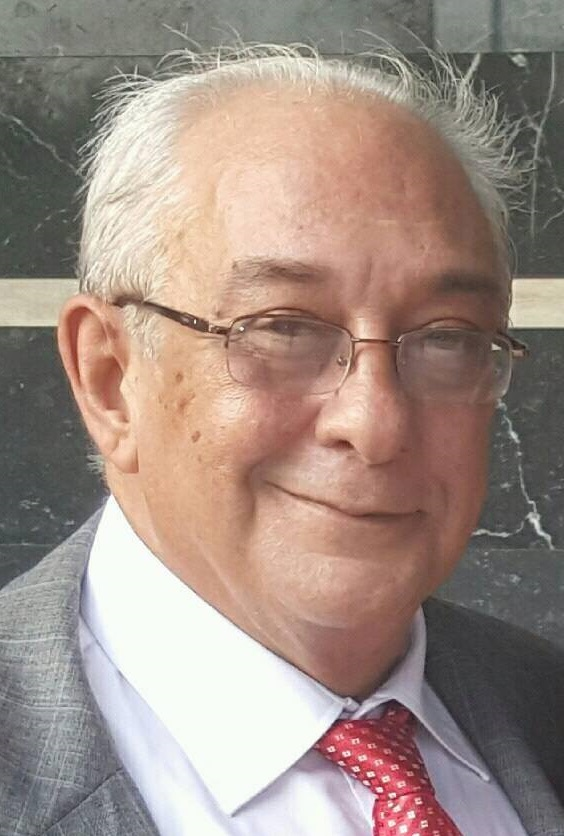
- Biaggi Lama in 2016
- Born: 26 September 1951; Barahona, Dominican Republic
- Died: 18 June 2023 (aged 71); Santo Domingo, Dominican Republic

Juan Alfredo Biaggi Lama (26 September 1951 – 18 June 2023) was a Dominican jurist, academic and essayist.

== Life and career ==
Born in Barahona, in 1974 Biaggi Lama graduated in law from the Universidad Nacional Pedro Henríquez Ureña in Santo Domingo, and then got a doctorate in Constitutional Law from the University of Castilla la Mancha, in Spain, and a master's degree in Copyright and Industrial Property Law at the University of the Andes in Mérida, Venezuela.

Biaggi Lama worked as a lawyer between 1976 and 1987. Between 1988 and 1992, he served as president of the Latin American Confederation of Tourism Press. From 1998 to 2021, he was Titular Judge of the Superior Electoral Court.

As an academic, Biaggi Lama was a co-founder and professor of the National Judicial College (ENJ); he also was a professor at the Universidad Autónoma de Santo Domingo, at the Universidad Iberoamericana, at the Pontificia Universidad Católica Madre y Maestra and at the Universidad Nacional Pedro Henríquez Ureña, where he also served as Dean of the Faculty of Legal and Political Sciences.

Biaggi Lama was a prolific essayist, authoring over 40 books. He died of heart attack on 18 June 2023, at the age of 71.
