= Linda Burdette =

American gymnastics coach (died 2023)

Linda Burdette (1948/1949 – June 6, 2023) was an American gymnastics teacher who was the head coach at West Virginia University. She coached at WVU from 1975 to 2011, posting a 644-263-4 record. Starting in 1980, she coached her teams to 35 winning seasons. Her teams also reached the NCAA regionals 33 times. In 1995, 1999, and 2000, her teams qualified for the NCAA Nationals. She led her teams to four Atlantic 10 championships and six EAGL championships. She was a five time EAGL coach of the year winner and served on the NCAA's Women's Gymnastics competition committee. Burdette died on June 6, 2023, at the age of 74.
