= Melvin D. Close Jr. =

American politician (1934–2023)

Member of the Nevada General Assembly
- In office 1964–1970

Member of the Nevada Senate from the 3rd district
- In office 1970–1982

Personal details
- Born: April 24, 1934 Provo, Utah, U.S.
- Died: June 8, 2023 (aged 89) Las Vegas, Nevada, U.S.
- Party: Democratic
- Spouse: Kathleen Close
- Children: Melvin D. Close III, Stephanie Close, Michael Close
- Profession: Attorney

Melvin D. Close Jr. (April 24, 1934 – June 8, 2023) was an American politician who was a Democratic member of the Nevada General Assembly. An attorney, he is an alumnus of Brigham Young University and the UC Berkeley School of Law. He was Speaker of the General Assembly from 1967 to 1968, and President pro tempore of the Senate in 1977 and 1981. Close died at home in Las Vegas, on June 8, 2023, at the age of 89.
