= Jack H. Cole =

American politician (1935–2023)

Member of the Georgia House of Representatives
- In office 1967–1976

Personal details
- Born: July 4, 1935 Whitfield County, Georgia, U.S.
- Died: June 27, 2023 (aged 87)
- Party: Democratic

Jack Herman Cole (July 4, 1935 – June 27, 2023) was an American politician. He served as a Democratic member of the Georgia House of Representatives.

== Life and career ==
Cole was born in Whitfield County, Georgia. He attended Dalton High School.

Cole served in the Georgia House of Representatives from 1967 to 1976.

Jack H. Cole died on June 27, 2023, at the age of 87.
