= Ámundi Ámundason =

Icelandic talent agent and publisher (1945–2023)

- Born: 14 May 1945
- Died: 14 June 2023 (aged 78)
- Occupations: Talent agent; publisher

Ámundi Ámundason (14 May 1945 – 14 June 2023) was an Icelandic talent agent, music publisher and newspaper publisher. He was the agent for Hljómar and later music publisher for Stuðmenn with ÁÁ-records. He later became the manager of the Social Democratic Party and a publisher of several regional newspapers in Iceland.
