= Armand de Mestral =

Canadian legal scholar (1941–2023)

Armand de Mestral CM
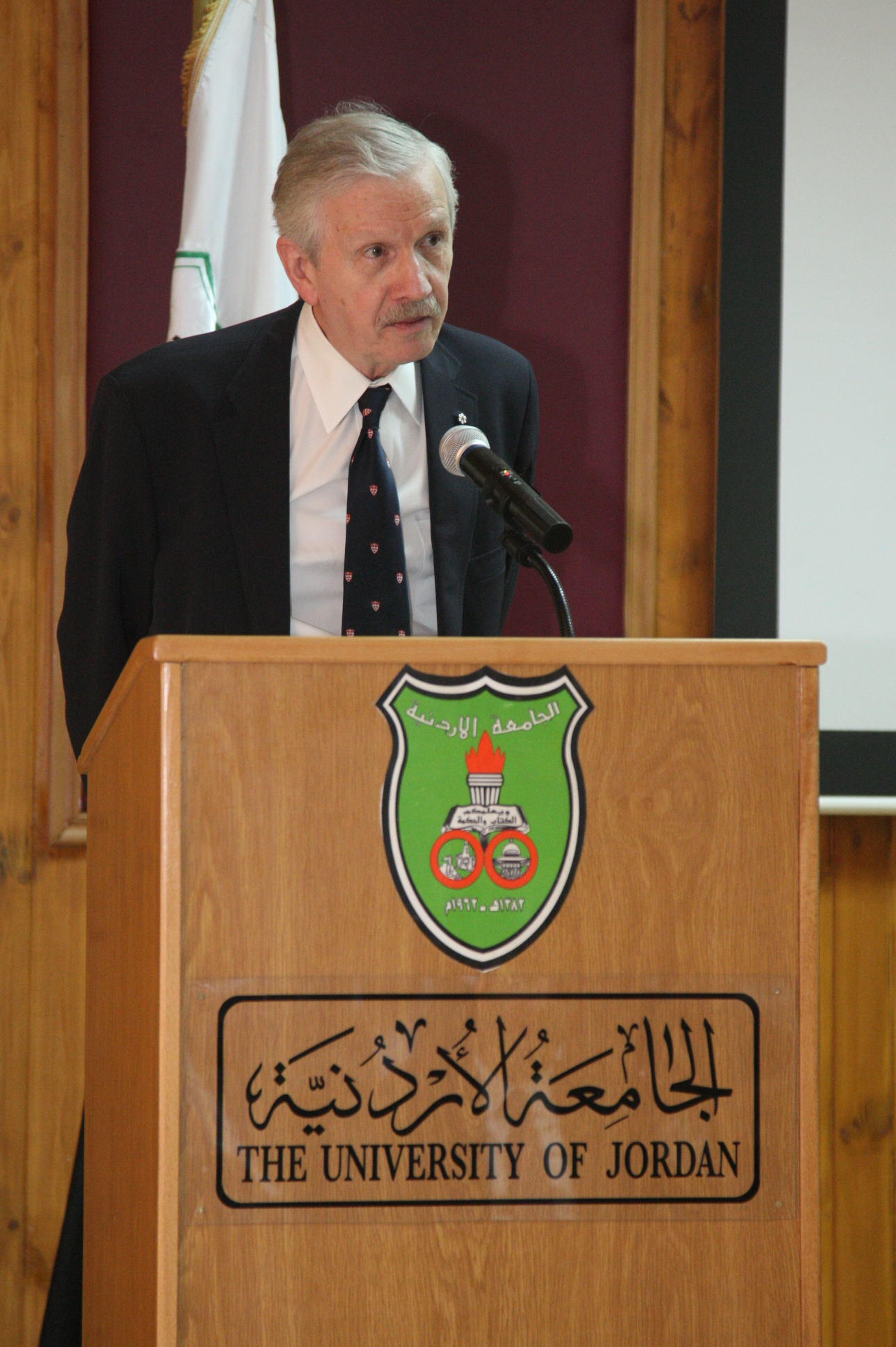
- Armand de Mestral (December 2013)
- Born: November 17, 1941; Montreal, Quebec, Canada
- Died: June 16, 2023 (aged 81)
- Education: Harvard University; McGill University
- Occupation: Professor

Armand de Mestral CM (November 17, 1941 – June 16, 2023) was a Canadian academic and international arbitration expert.

Born in Montreal, Quebec, de Mestral was educated at Whitgift School in Croydon, United Kingdom. He was a law professor at the McGill University and an expert in international law. He taught courses on constitutional law and the law of the European Union. He was also a senior fellow at the Centre for International Governance Innovation.

De Mestral had an undergraduate and master's degree from Harvard University, a law degree from McGill University, as well as honorary doctorates from Université de Lyon and Kwansei Gakuin University. He also served a term as president of the Canadian Red Cross. He was made member of the Order of Canada in 2007.

De Mestral was married to Rosalind Pepall, a curator at the Musée de Beaux Arts and they have two sons Philippe and Charles. He died from multiple myeloma in Montreal on June 16, 2023, at the age of 81.
