= Dionysius Pantelić =

Serbian Eastern Orthodox theologian (1932–2023)

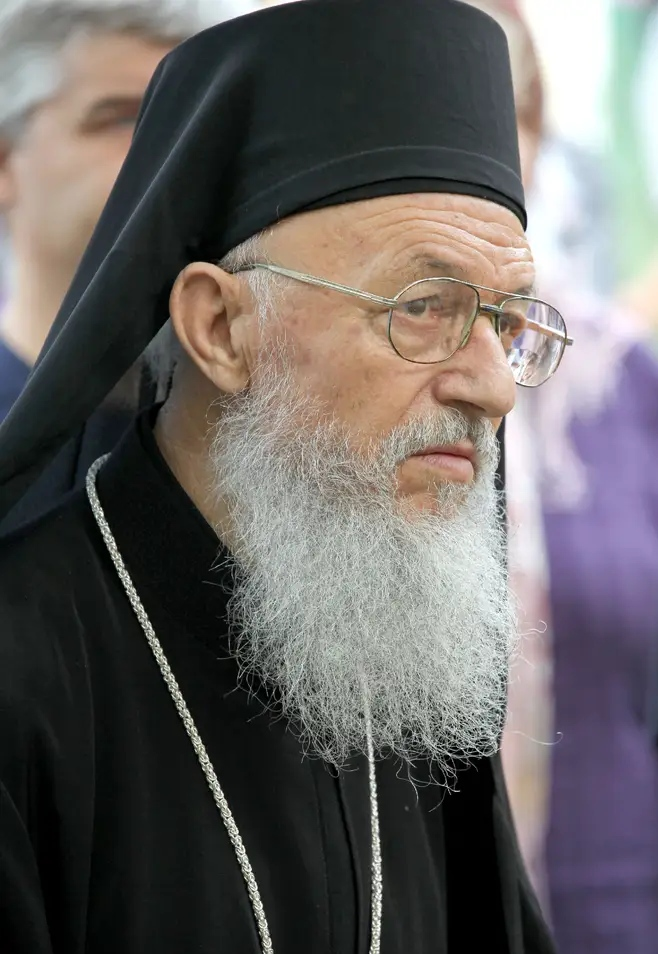
- Born: Dragić Pantelić; 16 October 1932; Riđevštica, Kingdom of Yugoslavia
- Died: 3 June 2023 (aged 90); Lipovac Monastery, Aleksinac Municipality, Serbia
- Education: University of Belgrade
- Occupation: Eastern Orthodox theologian

Dionysius Pantelić (Serbian: Дионисије Пантелић; 16 October 1932 – 3 June 2023) was a Serbian Eastern Orthodox theologian and archimandrite. He was a priest and was the hegumen of Lipovac Monastery from 1974 to 2005.

== Biography ==
Born in Riđevštica on 16 October 1932, Pantelić began attending monastery at the age of 14. He was ordained a monk on 16 October 1949, his 17th birthday. He was ordained a hierodeacon on 5 November 1950 in Niš and was sent to the Naupara monastery the following year. He then stayed in the Divljana Monastery until his military service, and subsequently was sent to the Monastery of the Holy Mother of God in Visočka Ržana, where he stayed from 1958 to 1974.

Pantelić arrived at the Lipovac Monastery under the blessing of Bishop Jovan Ilić, where he was hegumen from 1974 to 2005. That year, he was succeeded by Melanija Pantelić.[3] From 2005 to 2023, he was hieromonk of the monastery. On 25 March 2022, he was made a Great Schema by Bishop Arsenije Glavčić.

Dionysius Pantelić died at the Lipovac Monastery on 3 June 2023, at the age of 90. He was buried on 6 June, with the funeral service performed by Bishop David Perović of Kruševac, Bishop Arsenije Glavčić of Niš, and Bishop Joakim Jovčevski of Polog and Kumanovo.
