= Park Je-chun =

South Korean poet (1945–2023)

- Born: 23 March 1945; Keijō, Korea, Empire of Japan
- Died: 10 June 2023 (aged 78); Hyehwa-dong, Seoul, South Korea
- Education: Dongguk University
- Writing career
- Pen name: Bangsanjae
- Language: Korean

Korean name
- Hangul: 박제천
- RR: Bak Jecheon
- MR: Pak Chech'ŏn

Park Je-chun (Korean: 박제천; 23 March 1945 – 10 June 2023) was a South Korean poet.

== Biography ==
Park Je-chung was born in Seoul, Korea on 23 March 1945. Park graduated from Dongguk University in 1966 and immediately debuted as a poet in the Hyundai Munhak monthly. Park became a member of the literary coterie Poetic Thought in 1983 and in 1995 helped to found the magazine Literary Academy, for which he served as publisher and editor. He also taught at Kyonggi University and served as an official of the Korean Culture and Arts Foundation.

Park Je-Chun died on 10 June 2023, at the age of 78.

== Work ==
The Korea Literature Translation Institute has summarized Park's contributions to Korean literature:

His first volume of poetry The Poem of a Mature Man (Jangjasi, 1975) was not entirely successful in sustaining poetic intensity despite rhetorical flourish and sensuous language. If The Poem of a Mature Man failed to reach maturity, his second and third volumes of poetry, The Law of Heart (Simbeop, 1979) and The Law (Yul, 1981) respectively, make apparent that the poet is striving towards poetic maturity, abandoning flowery language to reflect upon the Buddhist world of goodness with solemnity and care. At the Moonless Buddhist Temple (Dareun jeumeun garame) and Further Than Darkness (Eodumboda meolli) show greater depth and breadth in the poet's language and his contemplation upon the world. In his latest volume of poetry, SF-Sympathy (SF-gyogam, 2001), Park delves into the crisis of poetry and of the literary arts at large brought on by the proliferation of visual media in the 20th century. Park's poetic imagination has evolved beyond mere contemplation on self to embrace individual as a part of larger group. With expansive worldview, Park continues to explore the meaning of poetry in the modern world.

== Works in Translation ==
- La Canción del dragón y otros poemas (박제천 시선)
- SF-Consensus: Poems of Park Je-chun. Translated by Chang-Soo Ko. Homa & Sekey Books, 2017.

== Works in Korean (Partial) ==
Collections of Poetry

- Taoist Poems
- Laws of the Mind
- The Third Star
- The Moon Over the Darkening Sea
- Farther than the Darkness
- Dreaming Prints
- The Autumn of my 23rd Year
- Your Name, My Poems
- Flower of the Sky
- In the Twelve Hells of the Blue Star

Collections of Critical Essays

- Wings of the Seoul
- Lectures on Poetry Composition
- Methods of Poetry Composition

Essays

- Selections from the Jade Mirror of Mind
- Discourses on Herbs and Roots
- The Flame of a Dream-Filled Life
- The Fountains of the Heart

== Awards ==
- Hyundai Munhak Literary Award (1979)
- Prize for Poetry of Korean Poet's Association (1981)
- Nokwon Literary Award (1983)
- Woltan Literary Award (1987)
- Yun Tong-ju Literary Prize (1989)
- Dongguk University Literary Prize (1991)
