= Warren Ford =

Warren Lionel Ford (16 May 1933 – 21 June 2023) was a British tea researcher.

== Biography ==
Born in Lewisham, South London, he was the only child of Arthur Ford, a Prudential Insurance manager, and Hilda Hook, a pianist trained at the Royal Academy of Music. Ford attended Mercers' School but left at the age of sixteen.

After leaving school, Ford began an apprenticeship with Joseph Tetley & Co in the coffee department but soon shifted his focus to tea. His early career included a year in Sri Lanka and three years in Calcutta working in Tetley's tea-buying offices. By 1952, he was back in London, participating in tea auctions, a practice established since the early 1700s. In 1953, Ford was involved in introducing mass-manufactured teabags in the UK and was appointed head of Tetley's blending department.

Following Tetley's acquisition by J Lyons and Co in 1973, Ford became an independent tea buyer and consultant, operating from a warehouse in the East End and offices on Great Portland Street. He worked as a broker and buyer for smaller manufacturers and merchants.

Ford later joined Taylors of Harrogate as a consultant and was appointed a director in 1976 while continuing his role as an independent buyer. In the 1990s, he resumed producing his own tea and remained involved with Yorkshire Tea, providing mentorship to upcoming tea buyers. He was associated with Yorkshire Tea for nearly fifty years. He died on June 21, 2023, following complications from surgery for a broken hip.

== Personal life ==
In 1957, Ford married Gill West, and they had two sons, Kevin and Graham. The marriage ended in divorce, and in 1998, he met Judy Mahoney, a primary schoolteacher. They married in 2005.
