= Sabine Wils =

German politician (1959–2023)

Sabine Wils MdEP
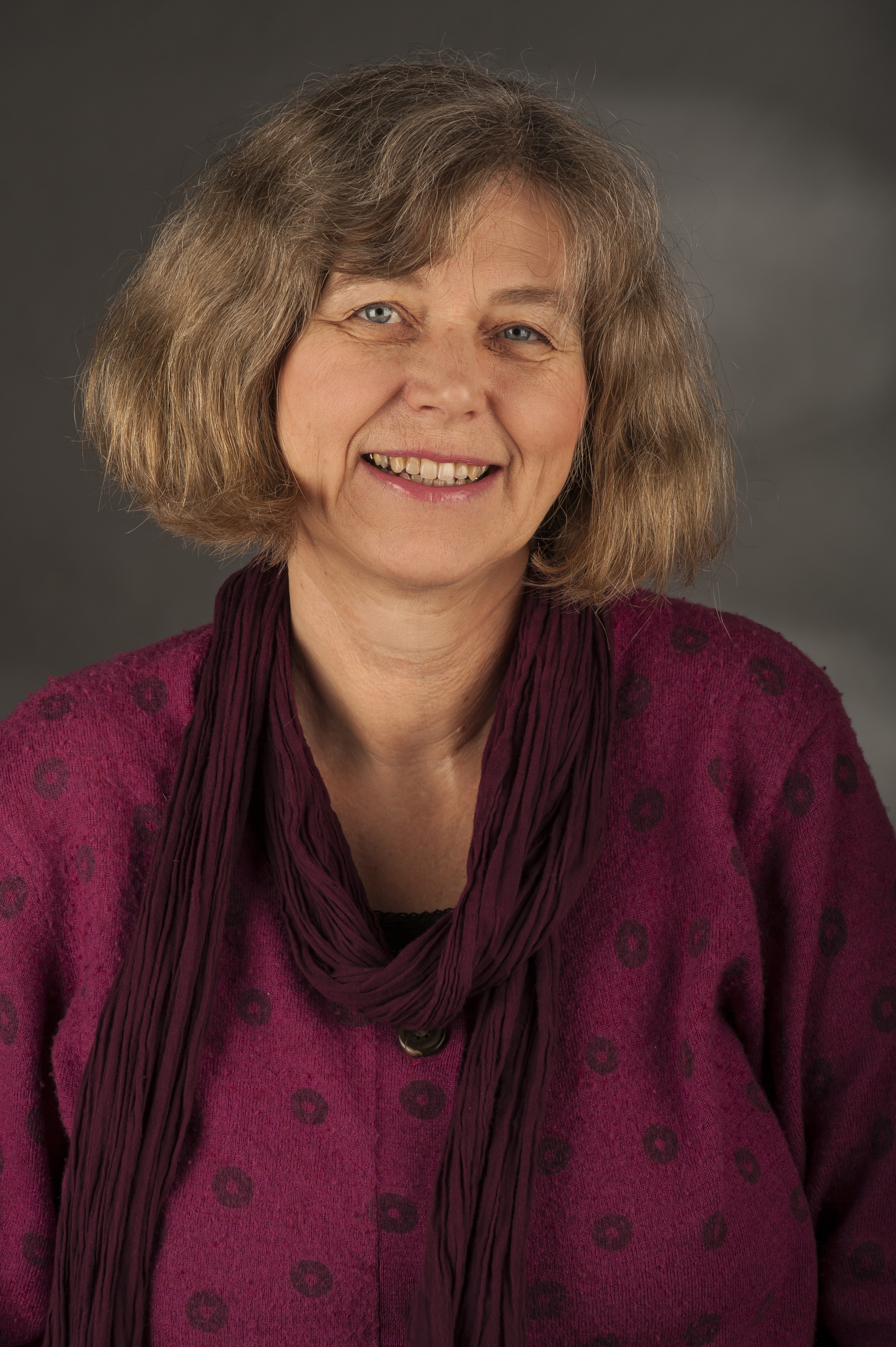

Member of the European Parliament for Germany
- In office 14 July 2009 – 18 June 2023

Personal details
- Born: 31 May 1959 Aachen, North Rhine-Westphalia, West Germany
- Died: 18 June 2023 (aged 64)
- Party: Die Linke

Sabine Wils (31 May 1959 – 18 June 2023) was a German politician who was a Member of the European Parliament for Die Linke from 2009 until her death.

== Life and career ==
Sabine Wils was born and grew up in Aachen, where she completed secondary school in 1977, before training as a midwife in Hamburg between 1978 and 1980. In 1980, she began studying chemistry, and graduated with a chemistry degree in 1988. Subsequently, she worked between 1989 and 1997 at the Environmental Agency in Hamburg, and from 2004 in the local authority for urban development and the environment. From 1999, she was a member of the Party of Democratic Socialism and its successor, Die Linke. Between 1980 and 1989, she was a member of the German Communist Party and at times in the Socialist German Workers Youth and MSB Spartakus. She was married and had three children.

Wils died on 18 June 2023, at the age of 64.

== Politics ==
In the European elections in 2009, where Die Linke won eight seats, Sabine Wils was elected as the second candidate on the party's list, behind party chairman Lothar Bisky. From 14 July 2009 to her death, Wils was a member of the European Parliament and a full member of the Committee on the Environment, Public Health and Food Safety, substitute member of the Committee on Transport and Tourism, and a member of the delegation for relations with Switzerland, Iceland and Norway and the European Economic Area (EEA) Joint Parliamentary Committee.
