= Lim Ji-hye (streamer) =

South Korean model and YouTuber (1990–2023)

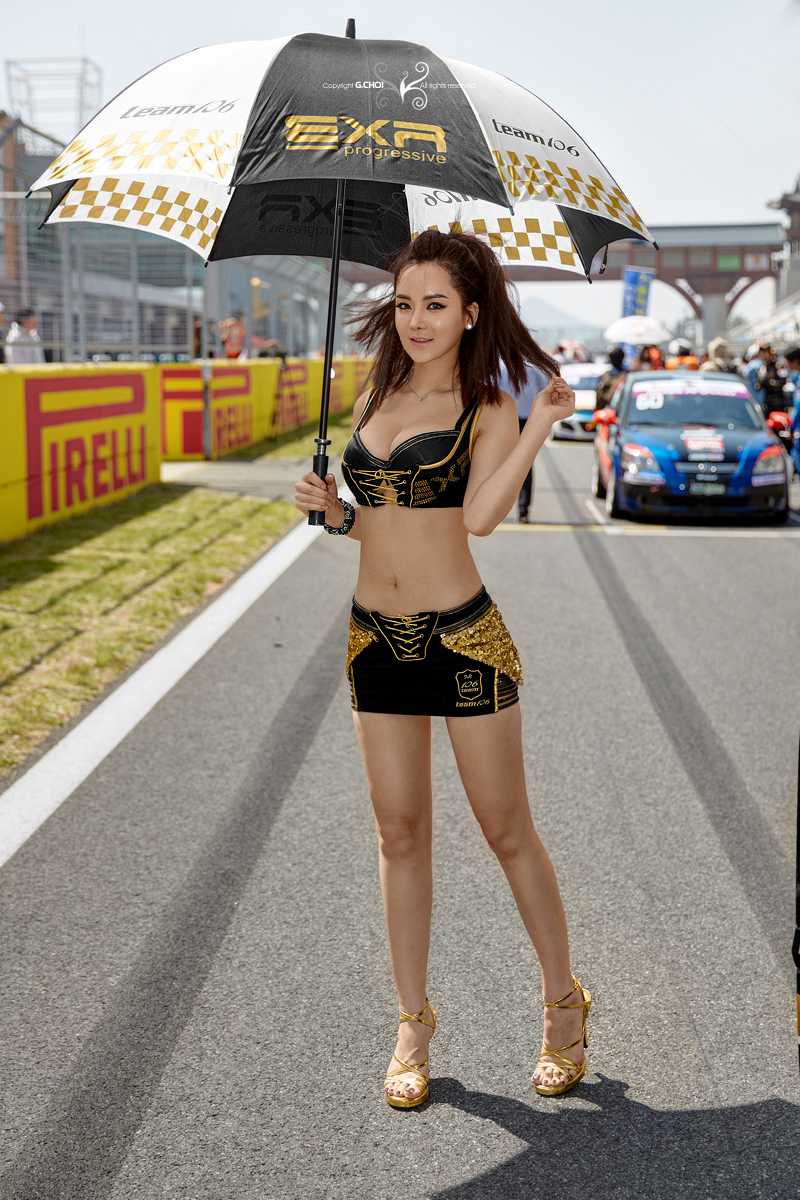
- Lim in 2013
- Born: February 14, 1986; Seoul, South Korea
- Died: June 18, 2023 (aged 37); Seoul, South Korea
- Other name: BJ Imvely
- Occupations: Grid girl; live streamer; MMC ring girl
- Years active: 2006–2023

Lim Ji-hye (February 14, 1986 – June 18, 2023) was a South Korean model and live streamer. She debuted as a racing model in 2006 and also worked as a match girl for Road FC, a mixed martial arts group in South Korea. She retired following her marriage on February 22, 2014; she subsequently divorced in 2018. After her divorce, she resumed working as a model and streamer; she used the stage name BJ Imvely. She committed suicide in June 2023.

== Professional life ==
Lim served as a racing model with Team EXR in 2012, and at the 2013 Seoul Auto Show for Oulim Motors. She also served as a match girl with Road FC in 2012.

She had a small acting role in the 2006 film Sunflower. Since 2019, she became popular as a live streamer on YouTube and AfreecaTV.

=== Last live stream and death ===
Lim appeared in a live stream event with several other streamers on June 11, 2023. While the group was shown to be having a good time and drinking alcohol, Lim was seen arguing with another young woman during the event. Back home a few hours later, she began what would be her last live performance.

While appearing live on her YouTube channel that evening, she tearfully explained to her fans how she was feeling at the time, apologizing to her family and displaying a copy of her will before walking off screen. Her will contained the phrases "I feel sorry for my girls" and "I hope I won't feel guilty living my life in the future". During the live stream, she received repeated and numerous calls on her mobile phone from concerned friends. Paramedics were alerted to the situation, arriving on scene tens of minutes later; they stopped the broadcast. Media reports explained that she attempted an "extreme act" on June 13, subsequently finding herself in critical condition. It was reported that after two cardiac arrests she was unconscious and required further monitoring in hospital.

Her obituary was published on her personal Instagram account on June 19, 2023.

Police have indicated that they are investigating the circumstances surrounding her death, and other related incidents. They are investigating the possibility that Lim's suicide was encouraged.

She is survived by her two daughters, her parents and two brothers.

Her death was discussed by netizens amid the numerous celebrity suicides in South Korea.
