= Subramanyan Chenna Keshu =

Indian military personnel (1925–2023)

Subramanyan Chennakeshu
- Born: November 1925; Coimbatore, Madras Province, British India
- Died: May 2023 (aged 97) Bengaluru, Karnataka, India
- Allegiance: India
- Branch: Indian Air Force; Hindustan Aeronautics Limited
- Service years: 1947–1969
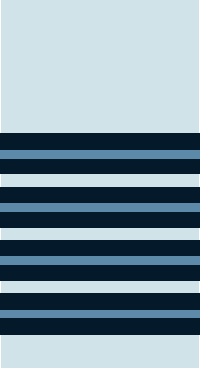
- Rank: Group Captain
- Awards: Vishisht Seva Medal

Group Captain Subramanyan Chenna Keshu (November 1925 – May 2023) was an officer of the Indian Air Force. He joined the Indian Air Force in 1947 as an Engineer Officer. In 1960 he was deputed to serve as a prototype production engineer at Hindustan Aeronautics Limited (H.A.L.). He was an integral part of the team that built the H.F-24 Marut, the first fighter jet developed in India. On 26 January 1964, he was awarded the Vishisht Seva Medal for his service and contribution. After retiring from the Air Force in 1969, he joined H.A.L. as a production engineer and went on to become managing director.

Keshu died in May 2023, at the age of 97.
