= Michael Dennis Feit =

American physicist (1942–2023)

Michael Dennis Feit (1942–2023) was an American physicist at the Lawrence Livermore National Laboratory, California.

Born in Easton, Pennsylvania, he studied physics at Lehigh University, graduating B.A in physics in 1964, which was followed by a Ph.D. in 1969 from the Rensselaer Polytechnic Institute. After a brief period as a research associate in the department of physics at the University of Illinois he joined the Lawrence Livermore National Laboratory in 1972.

At Livermore his main interests were in the fields of optics and lasers and from 1992 until 1996 he worked as the leader of the optical physics group, afterwards becoming the leader for theoretical optics. Later, from 1997 until 2005, he held the title of leader of the laser damage modeling group at the National Ignition Facility nuclear fusion project.

He was awarded the status of Fellow in the American Physical Society, after they were nominated by their Division of Laser Science in 1988, for the development and implementation of novel and powerful computational techniques with applications to optical propagation physics and the quantum theory of atoms and molecules and for contributing to the fundamental understanding of complex optical waveguiding devices. In 1992 he was elected a fellow of the Optical Society of America.

== See also ==
- List of fellows of the American Physical Society (1972–1997)
