= Ben Heaton =

English rugby league footballer (1990–2023)

Personal information
- Full name: Benjamin Graham Heaton
- Born: 12 March 1990 Rochdale
- Died: 23 June 2023 (aged 33)

Playing information
- Height: 6 ft 0 in (1.83 m)
- Weight: 15 st 0 lb (95 kg)
- Position: Centre, Wing, Second-row, Fullback
Club
Years	Team	Pld	T	G	FG	P
2009–11	Oldham	49	20	0	0	80
2012–18	Halifax	137	58	0	0	232
2014	→ Batley Bulldogs (loan)	7	1	0	0	4
2019–20	Hunslet	17	12	0	0	48
2021	Oldham	5	3	0	0	12
	Total	215	94	0	0	376

Ben Heaton (12 March 1990 – 22 June 2023) was an English professional rugby league player who played as a centre, second row or fullback for Oldham, Halifax, Batley Bulldogs and Hunslet.

== Club career ==
Heaton started his career with Oldham before joining Halifax in the Championship. While at Halifax, he spent time on loan with the Batley Bulldogs.

In October 2018, Heaton signed a one-year deal with League 1 club Hunslet.

In September 2020, Heaton returned to former club Oldham in the RFL Championship. In 2022, he joined local amateur club, Higginshaw.

== Death ==
On 23 June 2023, Halifax Panthers announced that Heaton had died on 23 June, at the age of 33. His cause of death has not been released.
