= Dinah Faust =

German-born French actress and singer (1926–2023)

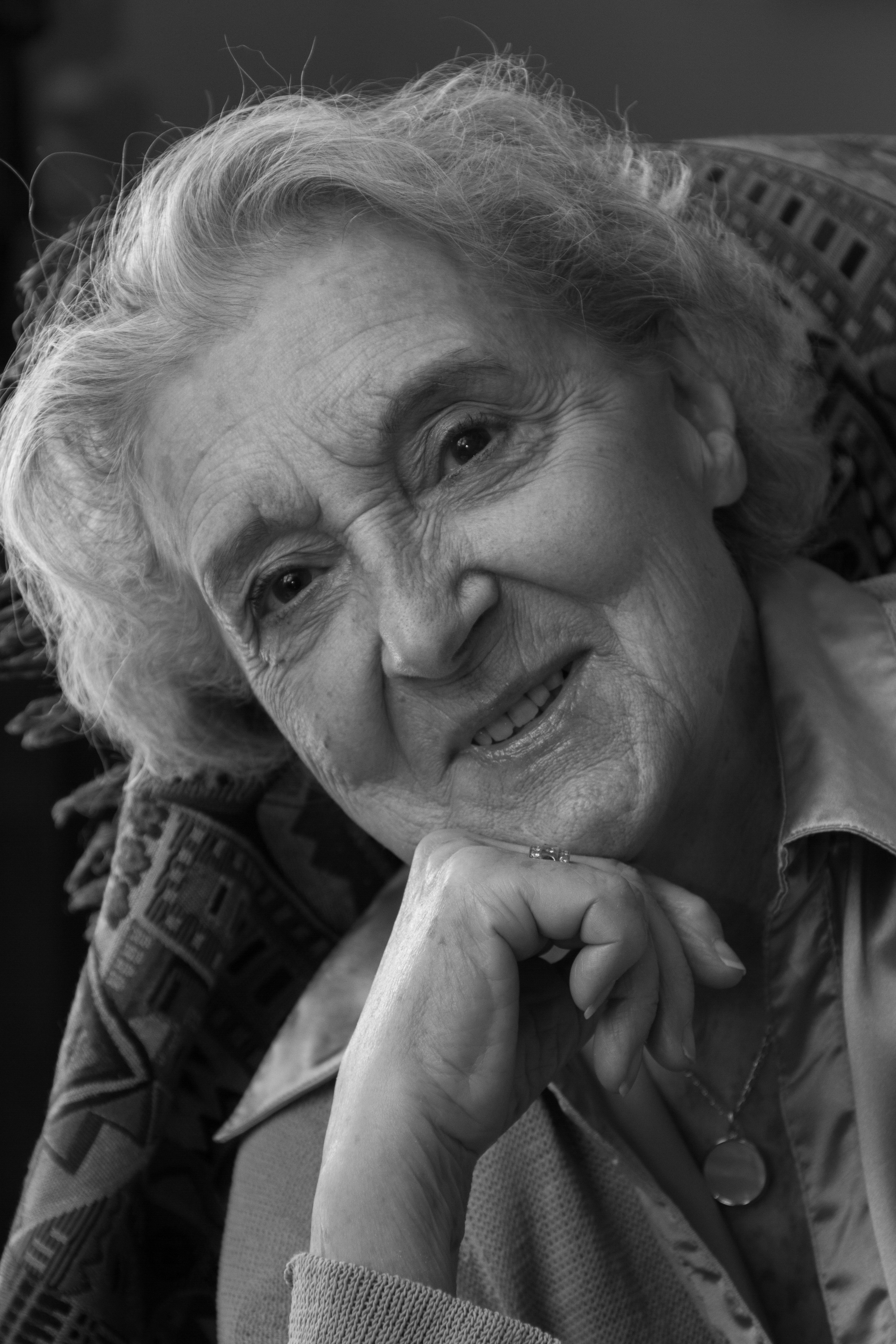
- Faust in 2013
- Born: 24 November 1926; Berlin, Brandenburg, Prussia, Germany
- Died: 9 June 2023 (aged 96); Strasbourg, France
- Occupations: Actress; Singer

Dinah Faust (24 November 1926 – 9 June 2023) was a German-born French actress and singer. She was the star of the bilingual cabaret Le Barabli, founded by her eventual husband Germain Muller, as well as Raymond Vogel and Mario Hirle.

== Biography ==
Faust was born in Berlin on 24 November 1926. She was the daughter of Céleste Faust and Johanna Heinrichs. In 1928, the family moved to Schiltigheim before settling in Paris. On film, she notably appeared in the television series Le Pèlerinage (The Pilgrimage) and Les Alsaciens ou les Deux Mathilde (The Alsatians, or The Two Mathildes). In 2004, she published her autobiography, titled Une femme tout simplement.

Dinah Faust died in Strasbourg on 9 June 2023, at the age of 96.

== Filmography ==
- Eine Räubergeschichte (1975)
- Tatort: Tod eines Einbrecher (1975)
- Le Pèlerinage (1975)
- Maître Daniel Rock (1981)
- Le 28 mars, 20 heures (1981)
- Zirkuskinder (1985)
- Das Turm-Engele (1986)
- Carmilla : Le cœur petrifié (1986)
- Enfin, redde m'r nimm devun (1990)
- Les Alsaciens ou les Deux Mathilde (1996)
- Le silence du cœu (1994)
- S'Beschte vum Barabli (1994)
- L'inconnu de Strasbourg (1998)
- Crépuscule (2000)
- Face à la nuit (2010)

== Decorations ==
- Officer of the Ordre des Arts et des Lettres (2007)
