= J. C. Arban =

American football coach (born c. 1969)

Biographical details
- Born: December 5, 1933; Athens, Alabama, U.S.
- Died: June 11, 2023 (aged 89)
- Education: Mississippi Southern College (1959)

Playing career
- 1955–1958: Mississippi Southern
- Position: Halfback

Coaching career (HC unless noted)
- 1959 (spring): Mississippi Southern (SA)
- 1960–1961: Rocky Creek HS (MS) (backfield)
- 1962: East Tallahatchie HS (MS) (backfield)
- 1963: East Tallahatchie HS (MS)
- 1964–1966: George County HS (MS) (backfield)
- 1967–1972: Pearl River (OC)
- 1973–1974: Southern Mississippi (QB/RB)
- 1975–1984: Pearl River
- 1985–1987: East Central (MS) (line)
- 1988–1990: East Mississippi
- 1991: Mississippi Gulf Coast (LB)
- 1992–1995: Mississippi Gulf Coast

Administrative career (AD unless noted)
- 1963–1964: East Tallahatchie HS (MS)

Head coaching record
- Overall: 95–73–4 (junior college); 7–2–2 (high school)
- Tournaments: 1–2 (MACJC playoffs)

Accomplishments and honors

Championships
- 1 MACJC (1976); 3 MACJC South Division (1975–1976, 1981)

J. C. Arban (December 5, 1933 – June 11, 2023) was an American junior college football coach. He was the head football coach for East Tallahatchie High School in 1963, Pearl River Community College from 1975 to 1984, East Mississippi Community College from 1988 to 1990, and Mississippi Gulf Coast Community College from 1992 to 1995. He also coached for Mississippi Southern / Southern Miss, Rocky Creek High School, George County High School, and East Central (MS). He played college football for Mississippi Southern as a halfback.

== Head coaching record ==
=== Junior college ===
Year	Team	Overall	Conference	Standing	Bowl/playoffs
Pearl River Wildcats (Mississippi Association of Community and Junior Colleges) (1975–1984)
1975	Pearl River	7–2	4–1	T–1st (South)	
1976	Pearl River	9–2	6–0	1st (South)	W MACJC championship
1977	Pearl River	6–4		(South)	
1978	Pearl River	4–5–1		(South)	
1979	Pearl River	6–4	3–3	(South)	
1980	Pearl River	6–4	3–3	(South)	
1981	Pearl River	8–3–1	4–1–1	1st (South)	L MACJC championship
1982	Pearl River	6–4		(South)	
1983	Pearl River	4–5–1		(South)	
1984	Pearl River	5–4–1		(South)	
Pearl River:		61–37–4			
East Mississippi Lions (Mississippi Association of Community and Junior Colleges) (1988–1990)
1988	East Mississippi	7–3	4–2	3rd (North)	
1989	East Mississippi	5–5		(North)	
1990	East Mississippi	6–4	3–3	4th (North)	
East Mississippi:		18–12			
Mississippi Gulf Coast Bulldogs (Mississippi Association of Community and Junior Colleges) (1992–1995)
1992	Mississippi Gulf Coast	6–4	3–3	T–3rd (South)	
1993	Mississippi Gulf Coast	4–6	3–3	4th (South)	
1994	Mississippi Gulf Coast	4–6	4–2	3rd (South)	
1995	Mississippi Gulf Coast	2–8	2–4	5th (South)	
Mississippi Gulf Coast:		16–24	12–12		
Total:		95–73–4			
National championship Conference title Conference division title or championship game berth

=== High school ===
Year	Team	Overall	Conference	Standing	Bowl/playoffs
East Tallahatchie Tigers () (1963)
1963	East Tallahatchie	7–2–2			
East Tallahatchie:		7–2–2			
Total:		7–2–2			
