= James Leavey =

British writer (1947–2023)

- Born: 9 December 1947; Beckenham, Kent, England
- Died: 24 June 2023 (aged 75)
- Occupations: Travel writer, comedy writer, journalist, broadcaster, editor, YouTuber
- Notable work: The Harrods Pocket Guide to Fine Cigars, FOREST Guide to Smoking in London, FOREST Guide to Smoking in Scotland

James Leavey (9 December 1947 – 24 June 2023) was a British travel and comedy writer, freelance journalist, broadcaster, editor and YouTuber.

== Biography ==
James Leavey was born in Beckenham, Kent, on 9 December 1947.

James started out as an actor, having trained at Mountview theatre school in London. After working in marketing for British Telecom, he became a freelance journalist, contributing to various radio shows, print articles and television programmes, such as BBC Horizon programme, "We Love Cigarettes".. Leavey also wrote The Harrods Pocket Guide to Fine Cigars. He wrote regularly for Cigar Journal and other magazines. He is the author of the FOREST Guide to Smoking in London and the FOREST Guide to Smoking in Scotland: Where To Light Up (1999).

Leavey died on 24 June 2023, at the age of 75.
