= Bob Munn =

Australian rules footballer (1939–2023)

Personal information
- Full name: Robert Edward Victor Munn
- Born: 22 December 1939
- Died: 5 June 2023 (aged 83)
- Height: 178 cm (5 ft 10 in)
- Weight: 78 kg (172 lb)

Playing career^{1}
| Years | Club | Games (Goals) |
| 1959–63 | South Melbourne | 41 (29) |
- ^{1} Playing statistics correct to the end of 1963.

Robert Edward Victor Munn (22 December 1939 – 5 June 2023) was an Australian rules footballer who played with South Melbourne in the Victorian Football League (VFL).
