= Gary M. Williamson =

American politician (1936–2023)

Member of the North Dakota House of Representatives
- In office 1965–1968

Personal details
- Born: September 17, 1936
- Died: June 24, 2023 (aged 86)

Gary M. Williamson (September 17, 1936 – June 24, 2023) was an American politician. He served as a member of the North Dakota House of Representatives.

== Life and career ==
Williamson was born September 17, 1936, in Atlanta to Oscar and Sally Williamson and enlisted in the United States Marine Corps in 1954 serving in the United States Marine Corps Silent Drill Platoon.

Williamson served in the North Dakota House of Representatives from 1965 to 1968.

He was a bank shareholder in the First Western State Bank of Minot, North Dakota and was indicted with five other state Democrats over the alleged illegal use of bank funds for political contributions.

Williamson died on June 24, 2023, at his home, at the age of 86. He was survived by with wife Mavis and four children.
