= Beatrix Eypeltauer =

Austrian politician (1929–2023)

Member of the National Council of Austria
- In office 4 November 1975 – 31 May 1983

Personal details
- Born: Beatrix Koref; 10 July 1929 Linz, Austria
- Died: 15 June 2023 (aged 93)
- Party: SPÖ
- Education: University of Vienna
- Occupation: Lawyer

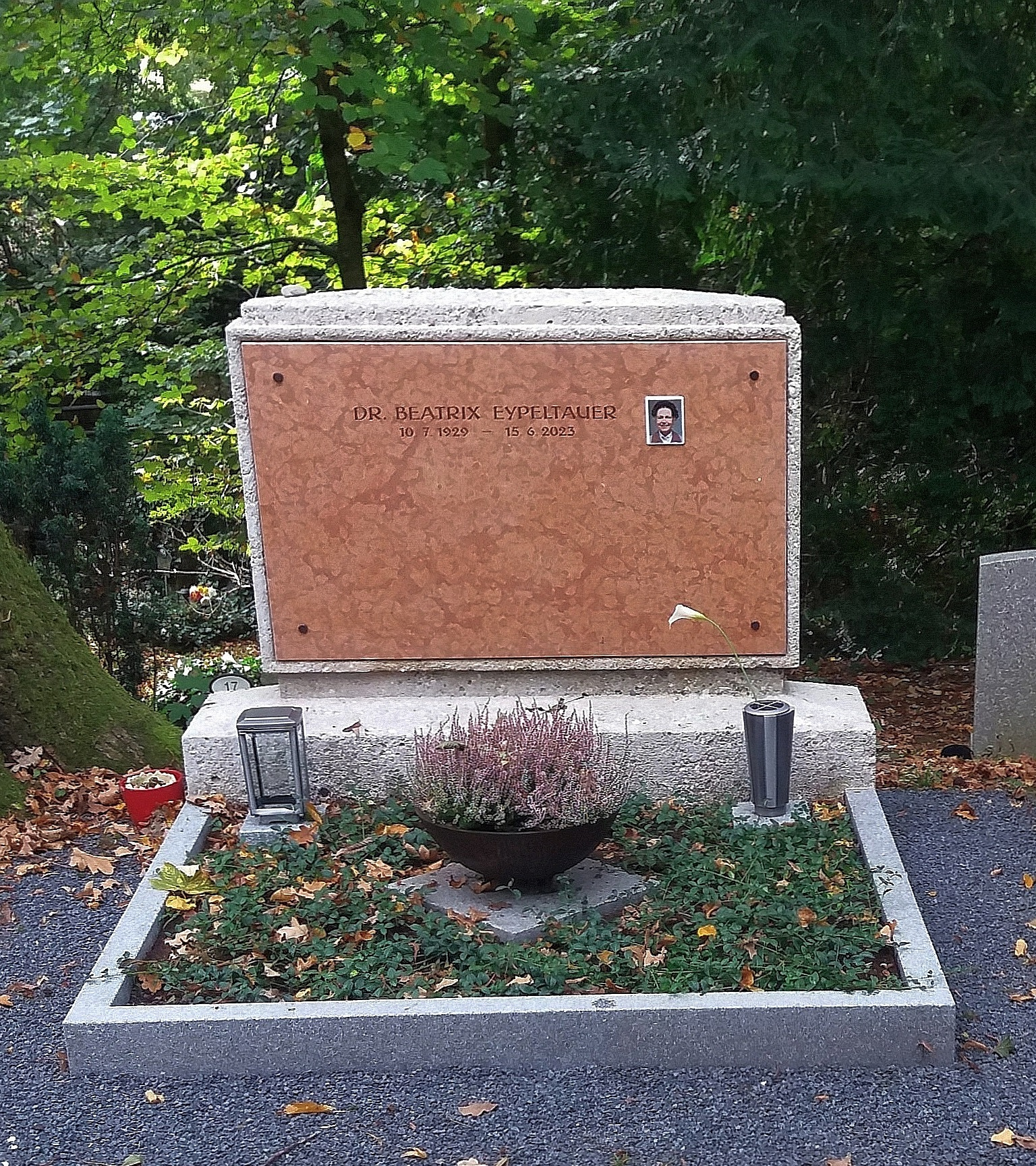
Their grave

Beatrix Eypeltauer (10 July 1929 – 15 June 2023) was an Austrian lawyer and politician. A member of the Social Democratic Party, she served in the National Council from 1975 to 1983.

Eypeltauer died on 15 June 2023, at the age of 93.
