= Quebec Route 173 =

Highway in Quebec, Canada

Route 173

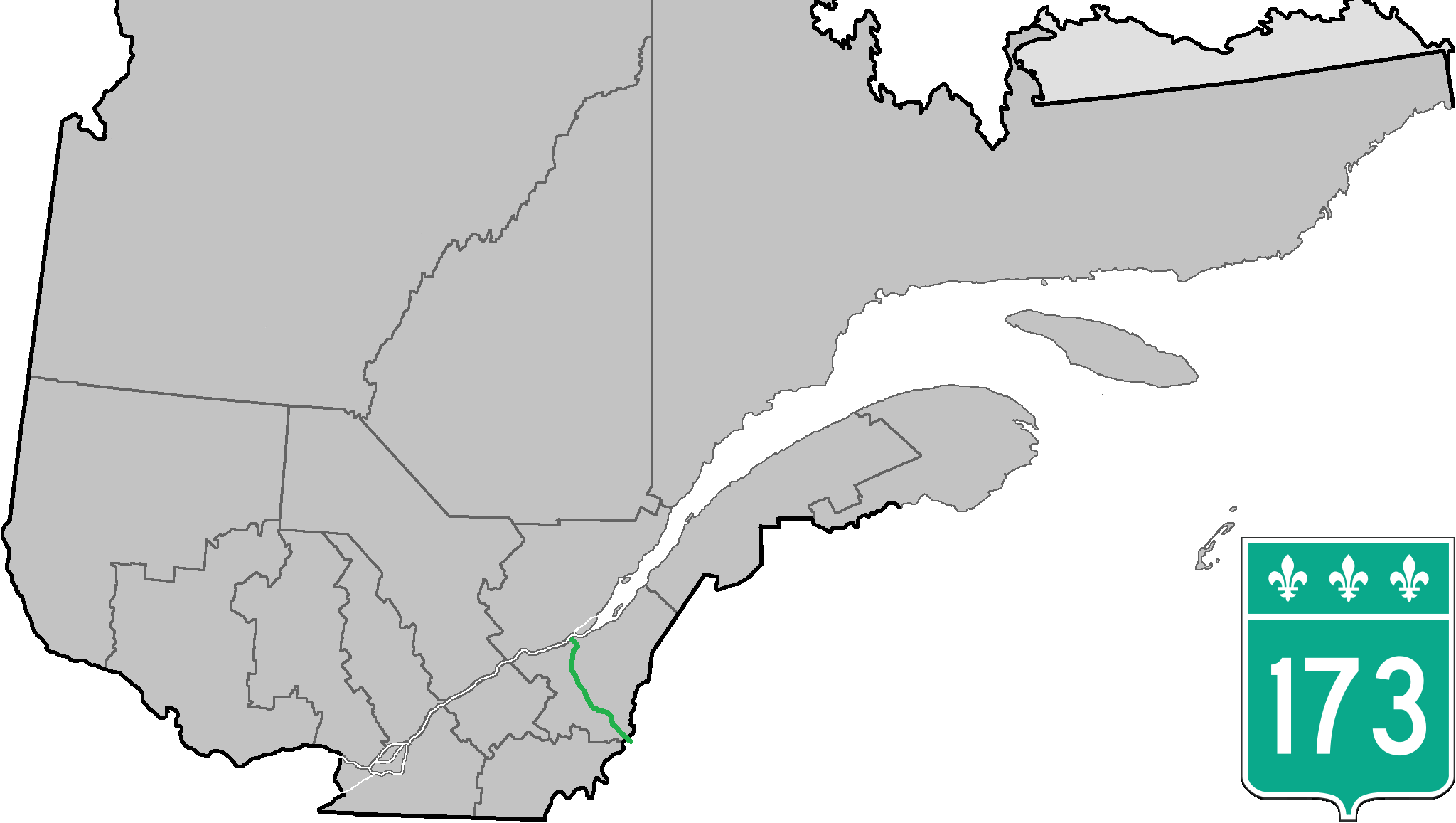

Route information
- Maintained by Transports Québec
- Length: 142.4 km (88.5 mi)
- History: Route 23 (U.S. border – Lévis) Route 1 (Vallée-Jonction – Saint-Maxime); Route 28 (Beauceville – Lévis)

Major junctions
- South end: US 201 / SR 6 at the U.S. border near Saint-Théophile
- R-204 to A-73 in Saint-Georges; R-108 in Beauceville; R-112 in Vallée-Jonction; A-73 / R-171 in Scott; A-20 (TCH) in Lévis
- North end: R-132 in Lévis

Location
- Country: Canada
- Province: Quebec
- Major cities: Lévis, Saint-Georges, Sainte-Marie

Highway system
- Quebec provincial highways; Autoroutes; List; Former
← R-172	→ R-175

Route 173 (Route-du-Président-Kennedy) is a major north/south highway on the south shore of the St. Lawrence River in Quebec, Canada, named after the assassinated American president, John F. Kennedy. Its southern terminus is at the Armstrong–Jackman Border Crossing in Saint-Théophile in the hamlet of Armstrong, at the border with Maine (U.S. Route 201 / Maine SR 6), and its northern terminus is in Lévis at the junction of Route 132. Route 173 follows the Chaudière River for most of its course, from Saint-Georges, down to Scott, where the route takes a more northeastern route towards Lévis, crossing the Etchemin River in the municipality of Saint-Henri-de-Lévis.

== Municipalities along Route 173 ==
- Saint-Théophile
- Saint-Côme-Linière
- Saint-Georges
- Notre-Dame-des-Pins
- Beauceville
- Saint-Joseph-de-Beauce
- Vallée-Jonction
- Sainte-Marie
- Scott
- Saint-Isidore
- Saint-Henri
- Lévis

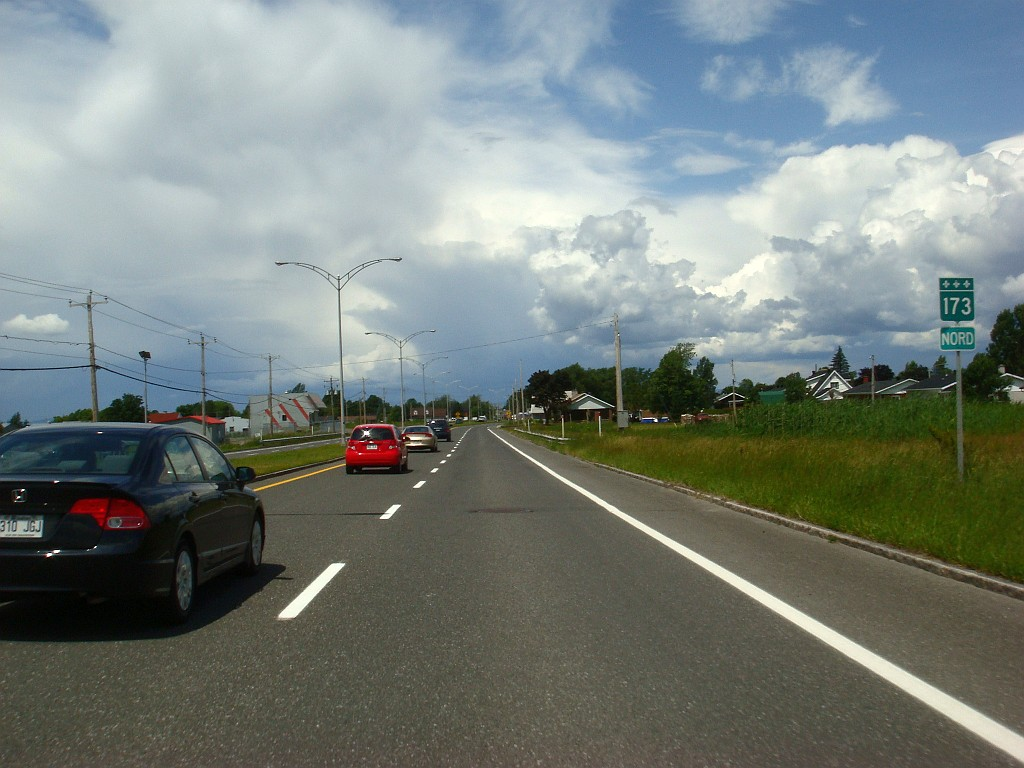
Quebec Route 173 in Pintendre

== Major intersections ==
RCM	Location	km	mi	Destinations	Notes
Beauce-Sartigan	Saint-Théophile	0.0	0.0	US 201 south / SR 6 east – Sandy Bay, Skowhegan	Continuation into Maine
Beauce-Sartigan	Saint-Théophile	0.0	0.0	Armstrong–Jackman Border Crossing	
Beauce-Sartigan	Saint-Théophile	17.0	10.6	R-269 west – Saint-Théophile, Saint-Martin	
Beauce-Sartigan	Saint-Côme–Linière	31.3	19.4	R-275 north – Saint-Zacharie	
Beauce-Sartigan	Saint-Georges	43.3	26.9	R-204 west – Saint-Martin	South end of R-204 concurrency
Beauce-Sartigan	Saint-Georges	46.5	28.9	R-271 north – Saint-Benoît-Labre	
Beauce-Sartigan	Saint-Georges	47.6	29.6	R-204 east to A-73 north – Saint-Prosper, Québec	North end of R-204 concurrency; to A-73 southern terminus
Beauce-Centre	Beauceville	62.4	38.8	R-108 west – Saint-Victor	
Beauce-Centre	Saint-Joseph-de-Beauce	74.3	46.2	R-276 west (Avenue du Palais) – Saint-Frédéric	South end of R-276 concurrency
Beauce-Centre	Saint-Joseph-de-Beauce	76.7	47.7	R-276 east to A-73 – Lac-Etchemin	North end of R-276 concurrency
La Nouvelle-Beauce	Vallée-Jonction	85.6	53.2	R-112 west – Thetford Mines	South end of R-112 concurrency
La Nouvelle-Beauce	Vallée-Jonction	85.9	53.4	R-112 east to A-73 – Saints-Anges, Québec	North end of R-112 concurrency
La Nouvelle-Beauce	Sainte-Marie	95.9	59.6	R-216 west – Saint-Elzéar	South end of R-216 concurrency
La Nouvelle-Beauce	Sainte-Marie	97.5	60.6	R-216 east – Sainte-Marguerite	North end of R-216 concurrency
La Nouvelle-Beauce	Scott	105.2	65.4	R-171 north – Saint-Bernard, Saint-Lambert-de-Lauzon	
La Nouvelle-Beauce	Scott	106.1	65.9	A-73 – Québec, Saint-Georges	A-73 exit 101
La Nouvelle-Beauce	Scott	106.1	65.9	Route Carrier	To R-175 north
La Nouvelle-Beauce	Saint-Isidore	114.5	71.1	R-275 south – Sainte-Hénédine	South end of R-275 concurrency
La Nouvelle-Beauce	Saint-Henri	124.4	77.3	R-218 west – Saint-Lambert-de-Lauzon	South end of R-218 concurrency
La Nouvelle-Beauce	Saint-Henri	124.8	77.5	R-275 north – Lévis (Saint-Jean-Chrysostome)	North end of R-275 concurrency
La Nouvelle-Beauce	Saint-Henri	127.9	79.5	R-218 east – Saint-Anselme	North end of R-218 concurrency
La Nouvelle-Beauce	Saint-Henri	128.9	80.1	R-277 south – Saint-Anselme	Roundabout
Lévis		140.2– 140.7	87.1– 87.4	A-20 (TCH) – Québec, Rivière-du-Loup	A-20 exit 325
Lévis		140.2– 140.7	87.1– 87.4	Boulevard Alphonse-Desjardins	To Lévis–Québec ferry
Lévis		142.4	88.5	R-132 (Boulevard Guillaume-Couture)	R-173 northern terminus
Lévis		143.0	88.9	Rue Saint-Georges	Route-du-Président-Kennedy northern terminus
1.000 mi = 1.609 km; 1.000 km = 0.621 mi: Closed/former; Concurrency terminus

== See also ==
- List of Quebec provincial highways
- List of buildings and monuments honoring presidents of the United States in other countries
