= Marian year =

Any year chosen for specific adoration of Mary the mother of Jesus

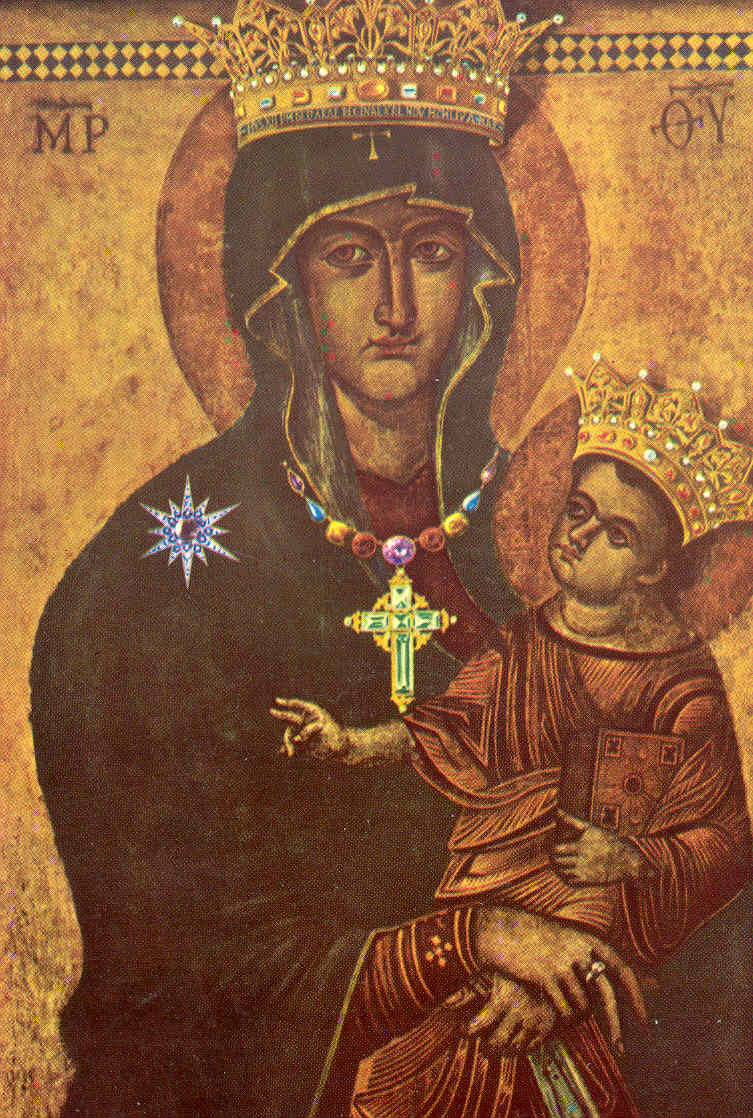
Icon of the Salus Populi Romani. The inscription on the Virgin's crown reads: Pius XII PM Deiparae Reginae Kal MCMLIV A Mar. (Pope Pius XII to the Queen Mother of God, Marian Year 1954).

A Marian year is a designation given by the Catholic Church to calendar years in which Mary the mother of Jesus is to be particularly reverenced and celebrated. Marian years do not follow a set pattern; they may be declared by a bishop for his diocese, or a national conference of bishops for a country.

In Church history, only two international Marian years have been pronounced, by Pope Pius XII in 1954, and Pope John Paul II in 1987. In both years, Marian devotion, Marian pilgrimages, and Marian meetings were promulgated.

== Pius XII: Marian year 1954 ==
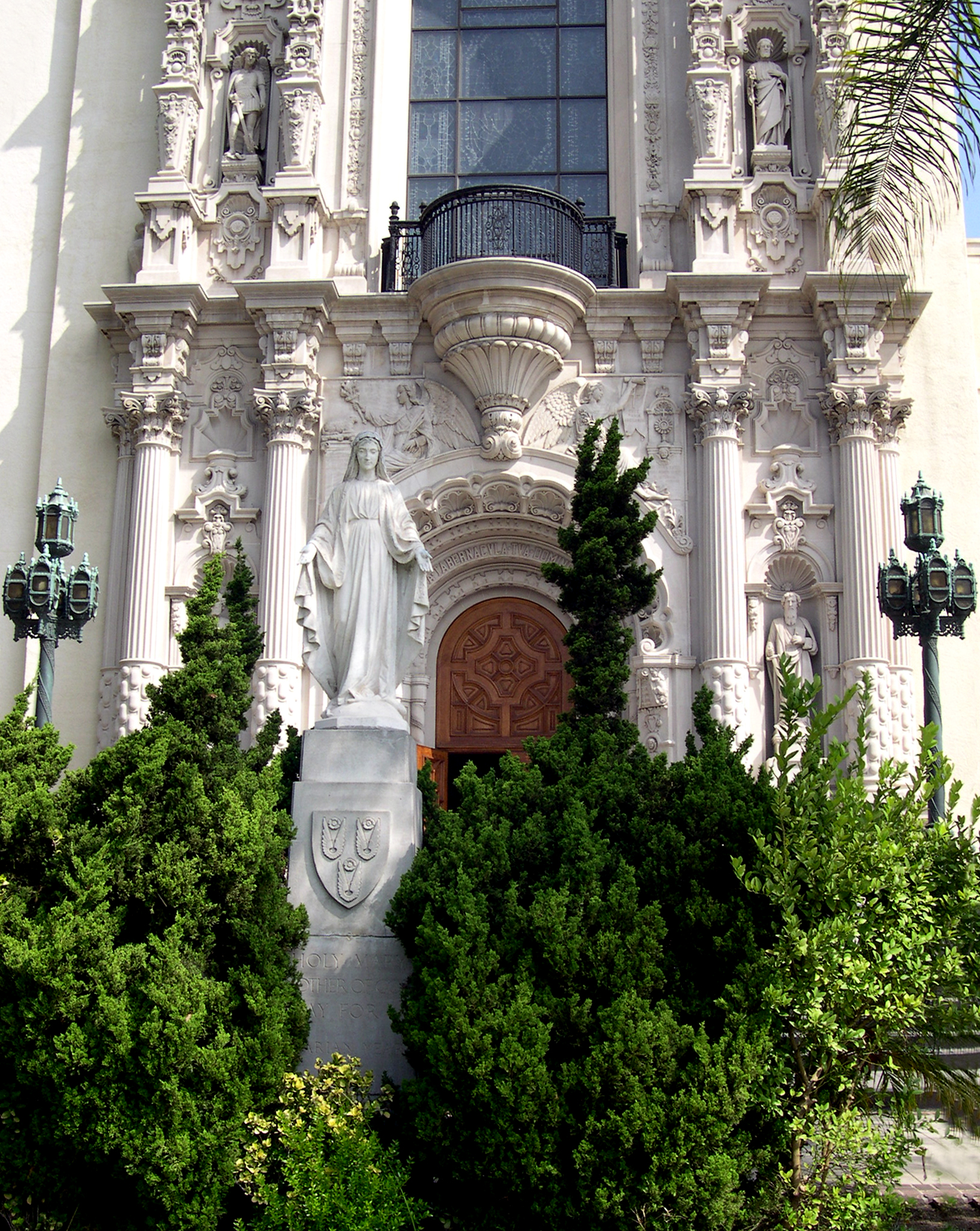
Statue of Virgin Mary commemorating first Marian Year, 1954, St Vincent Church, Los Angeles

In 1953, with the encyclical Fulgens corona, Pope Pius ordered a Marian year for 1954, the first in Church history. It was called to commemorate the centenary of the definition of the dogma of the Immaculate Conception of the Virgin Mary. The Marian year, which ran from December 1953 to December 1954, was filled with Marian initiatives, in the areas of Mariology, cultural events, and charity and social gatherings.

The principles of Christianity, which the Virgin Mother of God incites us to follow with eagerness and with energy, can be entirely and lastingly productive only when actually put into practice. Taking this into consideration, We invite each and every one of you, .. to celebrate the Marian Year which We proclaim to be held the whole world over from the month of December next until the same month of the coming year

The Pope promoted appropriate sermons and discourses to explain Marian beliefs. The purpose was to increase the Faith of the people and their devotion to the Virgin Mother. Marian churches and Marian shrines all over the world, "or at least an altar, in which the sacred image of the Blessed Virgin Mary is enshrined" should invite to public services for the devotion of the Christian people. The Pope invites especially to celebrations at the Grotto of Lourdes, "where there is such ardent devotion to the Blessed Virgin Mary conceived without stain of sin".

On October 11, 1954, the feast of the Maternity of the Blessed Virgin Mary, Pius XII issued the encyclical Ad Caeli Reginam establishing the feast of the Queenship of Mary.

== John Paul II: Marian year 1987–88 ==
On New Year's Day 1987, Pope John Paul II initiated an international Marian year, from June 7, 1987 (Pentecost) to August 15, 1988 (the Feast of the Assumption), in preparation of the forthcoming millennium. According to Diarmuid Martin, of the Pontifical Commission for Justice and Peace, "The church has become extremely intellectual after the Second Vatican Council, and the Holy Father wants to bring back some of the traditional warmth that has gone out of fashion."

The Pope published Redemptoris Mater, the longest Marian encyclical ever written by a Pontiff. Addressing Marian belief and Mariology for the beginning of the 21st century, the encyclical served as the "main teaching resource for our spiritual life and pastoral action during the Marian Year." Bishop Gérard Dionne of the Edmundston said, "At a time when there are so many different forms of devotion and theological reflection about Mary that have not been officially approved by the Church, it is important to rely with confidence on the Pope's authoritative teaching."

For the beginning of the Marian year, a large copy of the Madonna della Colonna was completed for outside Saint Peter's Square. Pope John Paul II had been approached by a student who told him that Saint Peter's Square was cold and incomplete without the portrait of the Blessed Virgin.

== Others ==
- The Carmelites declared a Marian year in 2001 in order to deepen the Order's appreciation of its Marian heritage. Activities differed from province to province. Some held lecture series, others retreats, still others published works on the theme. In particular, there was a focus on the Brown Scapular as a sign of both the protection of Mary, and the wearer's commitment to the Carmelite charism.
- In October 2016, Bishop Thomas J. Tobin announced a Marian Year for the Diocese of Providence, Rhode Island, following the close of the international Extraordinary Jubilee of Mercy in November. In recognition of the centennial anniversary of the apparitions of Our Lady of Fatima, the diocesan Office for Divine Worship participated in a pilgrimage to Portugal. A missionary image of Our Lady of Guadalupe visited parishes in the Diocese, with various presentations and holy hours.
