= Saint-Odilon-de-Cranbourne =

- Municipality
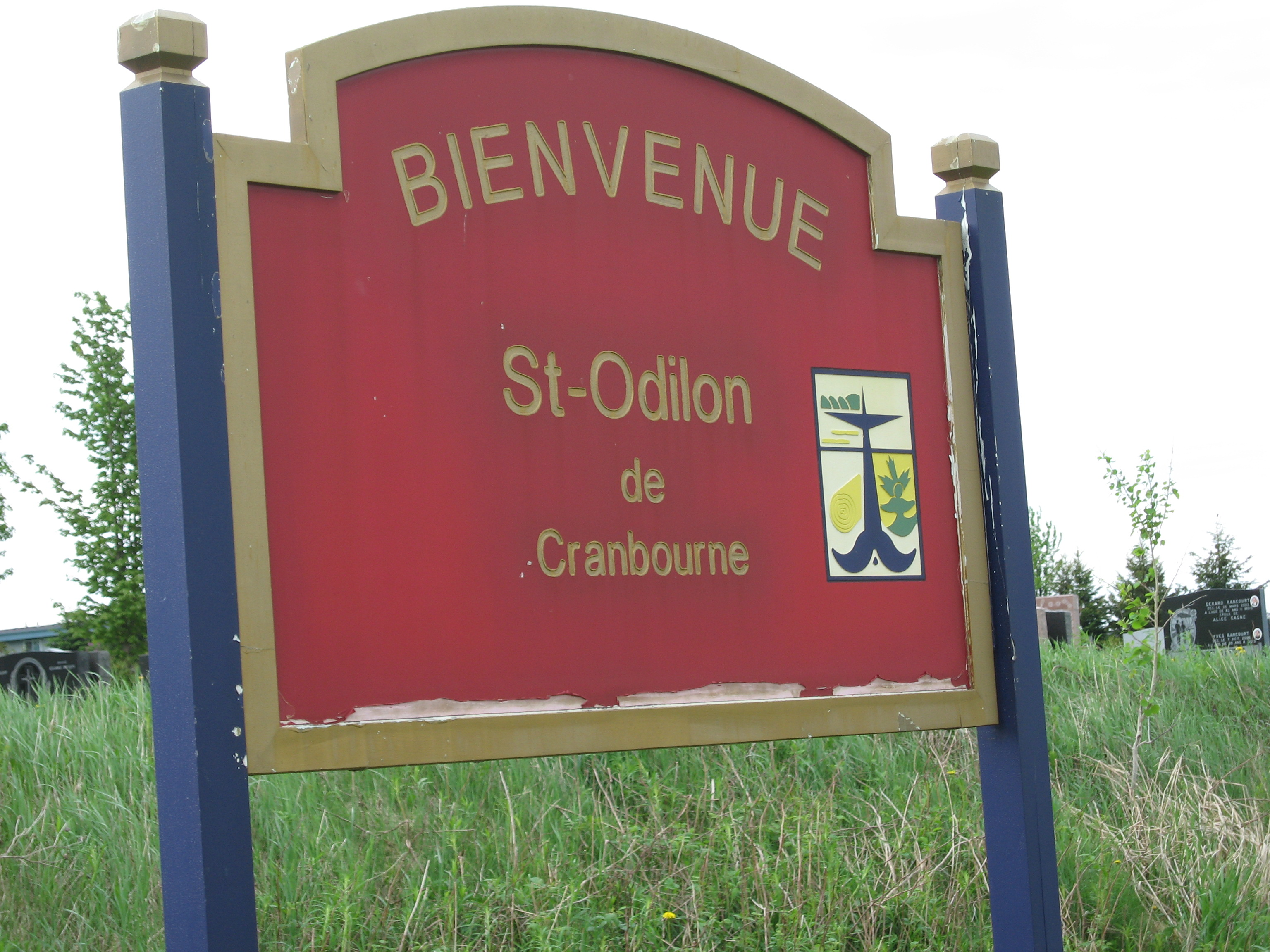

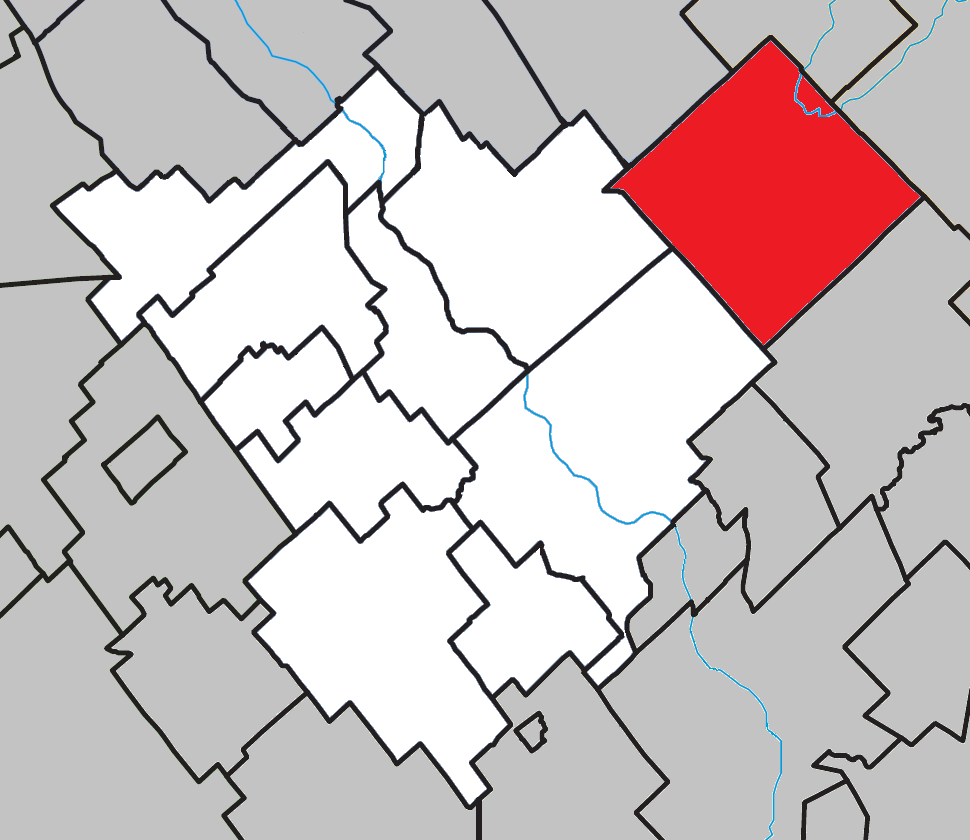
- Location within Beauce-Centre RCM.

- Location in southern Quebec.
- Coordinates: 46°22′N 70°41′W
- Country: Canada
- Province: Quebec
- Region: Chaudière-Appalaches
- RCM: Beauce-Centre
- Constituted: July 1, 1855
- Named for: Pierre-François-Xavier-Odilon-Marie-Alphonse Paradis and Cranborne, England

Government
  - Mayor: Patrice Mathieu
  - Federal riding: Beauce
  - Prov. riding: Beauce-Nord

Area
  - Total: 130.50 km^{2} (50.39 sq mi)
  - Land: 130.61 km^{2} (50.43 sq mi)

Population (2021)
  - Total: 1,407
  - Density: 10.8/km^{2} (28/sq mi)
  - Pop 2016-2021: ▲2.4%
  - Dwellings: 604
- Time zone: UTC−5 (EST)
  - Summer (DST): UTC−4 (EDT)
- Postal code(s): G0S 3A0
- Area codes: 418 and 581
- Highways: R-275; R-276
- Website: saint-odilon.qc.ca

Saint-Odilon-de-Cranbourne is a municipality in Beauce-Centre Regional County Municipality in the Chaudière-Appalaches region of Quebec, Canada. Its population is 1,407 as of the Canada 2021 Census. The municipality's name honours Reverend Pierre-François-Xavier-Odilon-Marie-Alphonse Paradis, the first priest of Saint-Odilon-de-Cranbourne, while "Cranbourne" comes from Cranborne, a village in Dorset, England.

== Geography ==
Saint-Odilon-de-Cranbourne is located in the eastern plateau of the Chaudière valley, southwest of Lac-Etchemin. Due to being in the immediate vicinity of Highway 73 and Beauce, it has been the scene of major residential and industrial development.

== Demographics ==
In the 2021 Census of Population conducted by Statistics Canada, Saint-Odilon-de-Cranbourne had a population of 1,407 living in 565 of its 604 total private dwellings, a change of 2.4% from its 2016 population of 1,374. With a land area of 130.61 km^{2} (50.43 sq mi), it had a population density of 10.8/km^{2} (27.9/sq mi) in 2021.

== Notable people ==
- Emmy Fecteau, current Professional Women's Hockey League player
- Simon Nolet, a former National Hockey League player
- Prosper-Edmond Lessard, (1873-1931) Alberta provincial politician and Senator
- François Thibodeau (1939–2023), fifth Bishop of the Roman Catholic Diocese of Edmundston
