= Sainte-Aurélie =

- Municipality
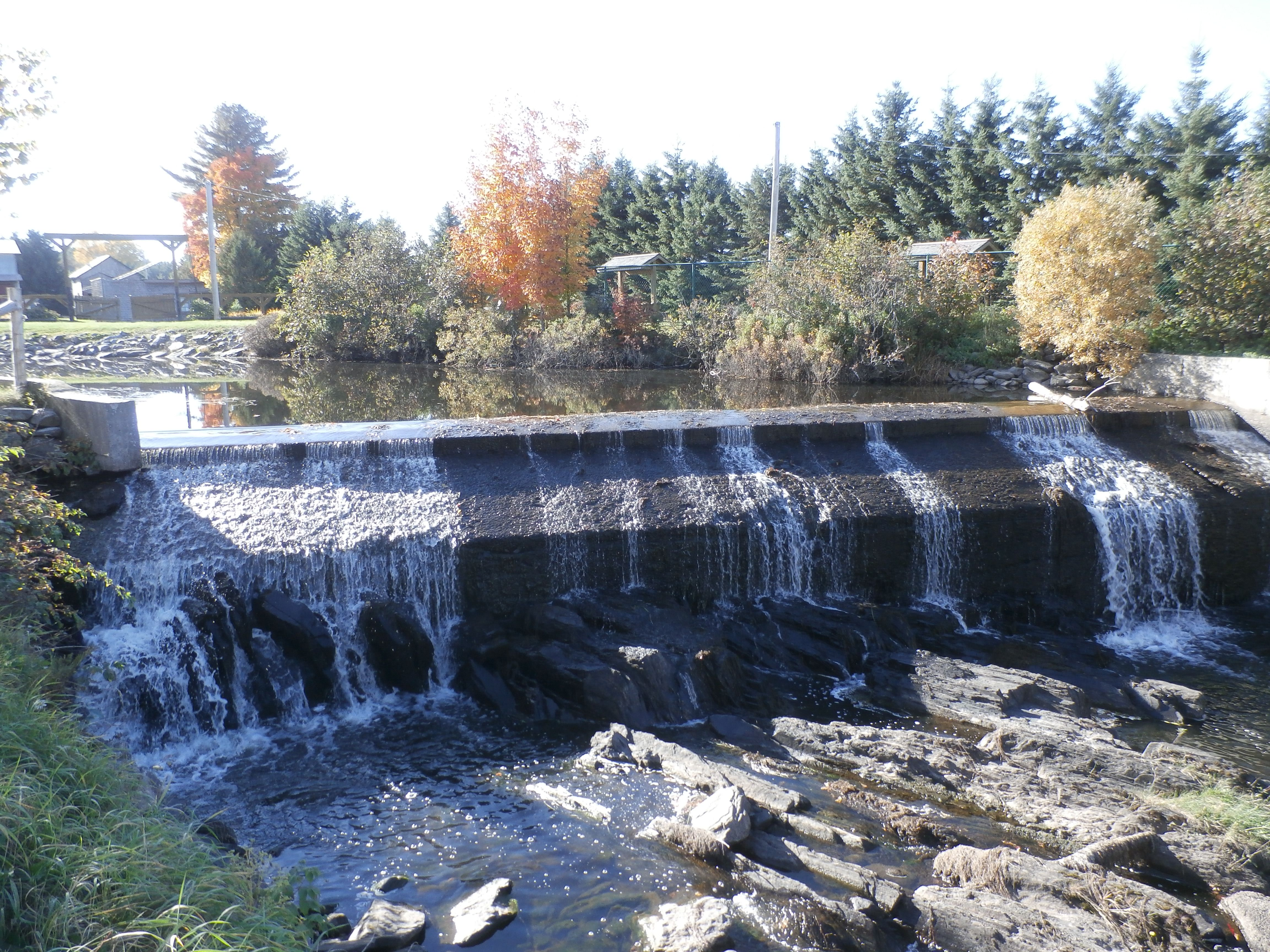
- Dam over Abenaquis Lake.

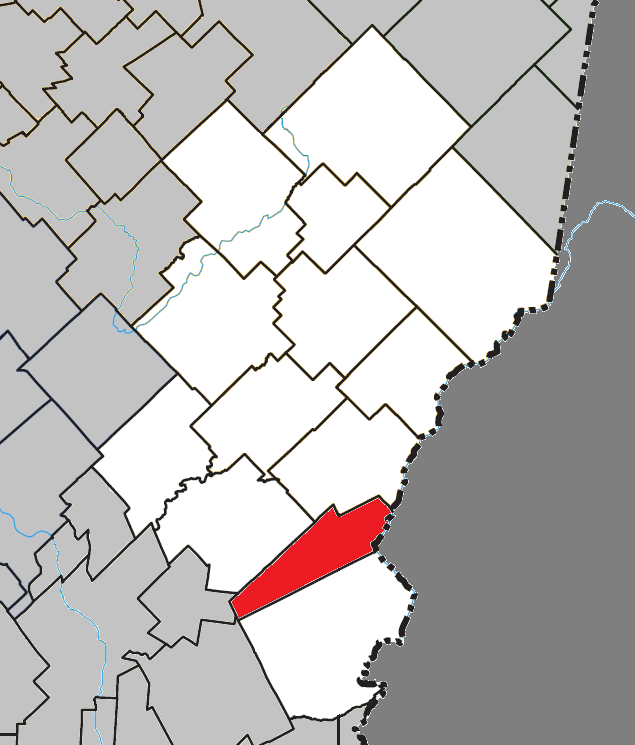
- Location within Les Etchemins RCM.

- Location in southern Quebec.
- Coordinates: 46°11′N 70°22′W
- Country: Canada
- Province: Quebec
- Region: Chaudière-Appalaches
- RCM: Les Etchemins
- Constituted: April 3, 1909

Government
  - Mayor: René Allen
  - Federal riding: Beauce
  - Prov. riding: Beauce-Sud

Area
  - Total: 79.90 km^{2} (30.85 sq mi)
  - Land: 78.25 km^{2} (30.21 sq mi)

Population (2021)
  - Total: 856
  - Density: 10.9/km^{2} (28/sq mi)
  - Pop 2016-2021: ▲1.2%
  - Dwellings: 507
- Time zone: UTC−5 (EST)
  - Summer (DST): UTC−4 (EDT)
- Postal code(s): G0M 1M0
- Area codes: 418 and 581
- Highways: R-275; R-277
- Website: www.ste-aurelie.qc.ca

Sainte-Aurélie (French pronunciation: [sɛ̃t oʁeli]) is a municipality in the Les Etchemins Regional County Municipality in the Chaudière-Appalaches region of Quebec, Canada. Its population is 856 as of the Canada 2021 Census. It is named after Sister Sainte-Aurélie, an Ursuline nun at the end of the 19th century.

Sainte-Aurélie has a small border crossing to the United States of America, Ste. Aurelie Station.

== History ==
Sainte-Aurélie was founded by a Frenchman named Victor Vanier in 1909. It was originally known as Metgermette-Nord and was created by separating from what would become Saint-Zacharie. It would be in 1932 that Metgermette-Nord would take its current name of Sainte-Aurélie

== Attractions ==
The Old Mill of Metgermette-Nord is located in Sainte-Aurélie. Built in 1873-1874 under the direction of Victor Vanier, this imposing structure bears witness to the last attempts at French colonisation in North America. Mr Vanier's ambitions, the richness of the forest and the presence of the Abénaquis river made it possible to build this three-storey mill. The second floor houses the flour mill, which has been converted into a showroom. The basement still contains the turbine and the hydraulic power transmission shaft that powered the machines.

After operating for more than eighty years and being abandoned for another fifty, it officially became a tourist attraction in 2003. Since 2022, it has been possible to visit the refurbishment of the former miller's rent on the second floor of the mill. In fact, and this is quite rare for a mill, miller Jean Giguère built a home for himself inside the mill, which he lived in with his family from 1899 to 1904. They even had 3 young daughters there.
