= Randolph Isham Routh =

British Army officer

Commissary-General Sir Randolph Isham Routh KCB
- Born: 21 December 1782; Poole, Dorset, England
- Died: 29 November 1858 (aged 75) 19 Dorset Square, London, England

Sir Randolph Isham Routh KCB (21 December 1782 – 29 November 1858) was a British Army officer reaching the rank of Commissary-General. He was senior Commissariat officer at the Battle of Waterloo.

== Early life ==
Routh was born at Poole, Dorset, the 7th child, of The Honourable Richard Routh, Chief Justice of Newfoundland, and his wife, Abigail Eppes. Three previous sons had died in infancy, so Randolph Isham was the fourth surviving child.

His Father immigrated to Salem, Massachusetts in 1764 at the age of 15 to take up the post of Assistant Customs Collector, and he married there Abigail Eppes of the Eppes family of Virginia. During the War of Independence, he took the Loyalist side and his refugee family itinerancy resulted in children being born in Salem, Boston, Long Island, New York, and Halifax. A replacement position of Chief Customs Collector of Newfoundland was obtained eventually, and he went there to take up that post with his Brother-in-Law William Isham Eppes. His family, now located in England, remained in Poole, Dorset, where Randolph Isham was born in 1782.

His Father operated for many years by commuting to Newfoundland annually for the warmer season to conduct customs business. Eventually, he was appointed Chief Justice of Newfoundland, but died on the passage to Newfoundland when his ship, the 16 gun sloop HMS Fly, disappeared and was lost at sea near Cape Flattery in 1801. Randolph was educated at Eaton College, but the death of his Father and the effect on the family finances after a few years forced them to curtail plans for a Cambridge University education, and consider an army career.

The Routh family had relatives in Guernsey and Randolph's brother John Routh (b. Halifax 1777) was a business partner with the Guernsey Le Mesurier family in London. Paul Le Mesurier was Lord Mayor of London 1893–94, and his brother Commissary General Havilland Le Mesurier obtained an appointment for him in the Commissary Department of the British Army in 1805, as he had for his son Henry Le Mesurier. Henry Le Mesurier later became business partners in Montreal with John Routh's son, Haviland Le Mesurier Routh. Close ties between these families were maintained.

== Early army career ==
Routh served in Jamaica first, and then was engaged in the Walcheren Campaign in 1809. He served afterwards through the Peninsular War; became Deputy Commissary-General on 9 March 1812, and was senior Commissariat officer at the Battle of Waterloo in June 1815. He also married in December 1815 at Fontainebleau, Paris, Adèle Joséphine Lamy (Laminière) who was 15 at the time and who was the daughter of one of Bonaparte's civil officers Matthieu Lamy. After the peace, he was on the Mediterranean station in Malta, and from 1822 Senior Officer in the West Indies, spending some time in Jamaica again. On 15 August 1826 he was made Commissary-General of the British Army, and was at once sent to Quebec.

== Quebec service ==
He was an obvious choice for Quebec as a fluent French speaker, with a French wife. At this time, the huge undertaking of the construction of the fortress Citadel of Quebec was being built as a defense against a further American invasion attempt, and there had to be a large British military establishment present among a French civilian population. Routh was in charge of all Army financial transactions in the Canadas, and his budget was often greater than the government of the Province of Lower Canada's treasury of the day.

One of his persistent initiatives was to persuade the House of Assembly of Lower Canada to adopt Sterling as the medium of exchange, thus simplifying and eliminating the troublesome use of multiple currencies. He was unsuccessful in this endeavor. Routh was more effective in his vigorous protest against the proposal in the early 1830s to turn all the financial business of the military over to local banks. In a 17-page report submitted to the British Treasury, he pointed out that the Bank of Montreal was the only colonial bank stable enough to undertake such a commitment, but he argued against this move on the grounds that the directors of the bank would then become the “real capitalists of the country at little personal risk” and no moral hazard. He also believed that both the efficiency and the secrecy of troop movements would be jeopardized if the Commissariat could not act independently of local banks. In 1838 Routh added his protest to that of the commander of the forces, Sir John Colborne, against the recommendation by Sir George Arthur, the Lieutenant Governor of Upper Canada, to have a separate Commissariat establishment in that province.

His first wife died of childbirth complications in Quebec in 1827, and he did not remarry until Jan 1830. He married Marie Louise Taschereau 30 years younger, who was the daughter of Judge Jean-Thomas Taschereau, and brother of Cardinal Elzéar-Alexandre Taschereau the first Canadian-born Cardinal. This was the same Taschereau family that subsequently became a political dynasty in Quebec for the next century.

== The 1837-38 Quebec Rebellion ==
Routh's service in British North America included the years of the rebellions of 1837–38, when his department was suddenly faced with wartime conditions and criticized by regimental officers in the field. Lieutenant-Colonel George Cathcart commented that Routh had no notion of organizing a field Commissariat and that nothing could have been more complicated or less efficient than his arrangements. Cathcart admitted that part of the confusion arose from Sir John Colborne's initial orders at the outbreak of the second rebellion in 1838 to have the troops live at free quarters, which led to plunder by them in the disturbed areas. Nonetheless, all troops were fed and supplied.

== Executive Council of Lower Canada ==
In 1838, John Lambton, 1st Earl of Durham was named Governor General and High Commissioner for British North America. The main task set for him was to investigate the political situation after the Rebellions of 1837 in Upper Canada (Ontario) and Lower Canada (Quebec) and make recommendations as to necessary reforms. Routh was again an obvious choice for Quebec. Having provided loyal service discharging his duties in the rebellion shortly before, and now married into one of the most influential Quebecois families in Ultramontane Quebec, and whose Brother-in law was Cardinal, it seems hard to imagine somebody more qualified to provide insider vision as to the direction political reform should take regarding Quebec. He held office from 2 June 1838, to 10 February 1841. He was knighted for his general services in March 1841. He returned to England on half-pay in February 1843.

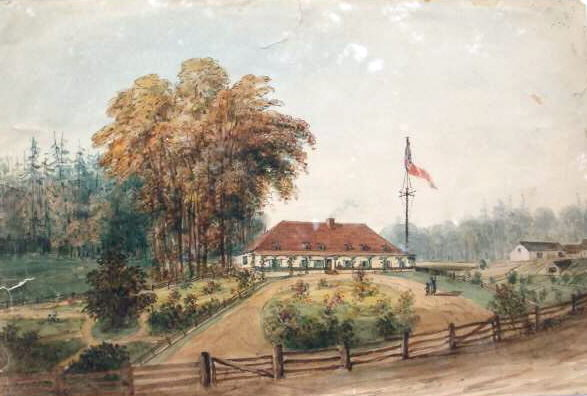
Routh's Summer Residence 1838, at Lac-Etchemin, Quebec, painted by his second wife, Marie Louise Taschereau (1811–1891)

== Major work ==
During the next two year interval on half pay, he wrote Observations on the Commissariat Field Service and Home Defences (1845, and 2nd ed. London, 1852), a handbook for Commissariat officers.

== Irish Famine Relief Commission ==
After two years on half pay, Routh was selected to be Chairman of the Irish Famine Relief Commission in November 1845, presiding until October 1848. He was again an obvious choice. He had expertise at the logistics of feeding and supplying large armies of men, and had written the authoritative book on the subject. Who better to select to superintend the feeding and distribution of relief during the Great Famine? For this service, his knighthood was elevated to KCB on 29 April 1848. He died in London, at 19 Dorset Square, on 29 November 1858 and was buried in London's Kensal Green Cemetery in the family plot there.

== Family ==
Routh married, first, on 26 December 1815, in Paris, Adèle Joséphine Laminière (Lamy), daughter of one of Napoleon Bonaparte's civil officers; who died of childbirth complications 1827 in Quebec. Secondly, at Quebec in 1830, Marie Louise (1810–1891), daughter of Judge Jean-Thomas Taschereau (1778-1832) and sister of Cardinal Elzéar-Alexandre Taschereau. Routh sired 15 children, 7 by his first wife, 9 by his second, 3 dying as infants. By his first wife notably, Commissary General Randolph Routh CB, Commissary General Leonce Routh, Capt. Jules Isham Routh of the Royal Welch Fusiliers who died of typhus in Ireland 1848 working with his Father on famine relief. By his second wife, the Cambridge mathematician Edward John Routh DSc, FRS, FRAS, Thomas Alfred Routh FRGS, and merchant Francis Alexander Routh of Montreal, Consul for Portugal.
