= Joseph Léon Kemner Laflamme =

Canadian-American journalist

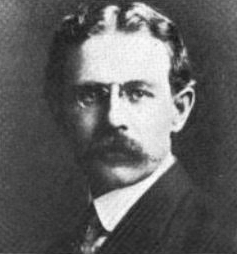
- Born: August 29, 1872; Sainte-Marguerite, Québec, Canada
- Died: November 19, 1944 (aged 72)
- Education: Bachelor of Arts (Université Laval)
- Occupation: Journalist
- Children: At least 1
- Relatives: Jean-Baptiste Rouillard (father-in-law)

Joseph Léon Kemner Laflamme (29 August 1872 – 19 November 1944) was a Canadian-American journalist. He worked as editor for newspapers in various American states and in Quebec, Canada.

== Biography ==
Joseph Léon Kemner Laflamme was born on 29 August 1872 at Sainte-Marguerite, Québec (Note: Although this is the date given in the sources, Kemner's birth does not actually appear at that date in Sainte-Marguerite's civil registries.) to Léon Kemner Laflamme and Mélanie Audette Lapointe.

He finished his classical course at the Petit Séminaire de Québec in 1894 and earned a Bachelor of Arts at the Université Laval. He then left Canada for Lewiston, Maine, joining some family members that had settled there.

In Lewiston, Kemner Laflamme took up journalism. He was editor for the Messager in 1895. Starting in late 1896, he was editor of J.-B. Rouillard's République, Maine's only daily newspaper until at least 1911, for all of its existence. After République closed, Laflamme moved to Fall River, Massachusetts. There, he became editor of L'Indépendant in 1897 as chief of news service. On 12 September 1897, Kemner Laflamme married Jeanne Rouillard. In 1900, he became the editor for the Journal. When the Journal closed down, he became chief editor of the Tribune of Woonsocket, Rhode Island in 1907. There, he expressed his ideas, notably on the defence of the French language in church and at school, in support of French-Canadian national societies and in opposition to neutral and Catholic english-speaking societies. He also contributed to the Revue Canadienne in 1900 and 1901, writing articles about Franco-Canadians in the United States.

In July 1907, Kemner Laflamme moved to Quebec City, where he became chief editor of L'Action Sociale. While still working at L'Action Sociale, he founded the Revue Franco-Américaine on 1 April 1908, of which he was still director in 1911.

He was a supporter of the Union Saint-Jean-Baptiste d’Amérique. He was founder and first president of the Association des Journalistes Franco-Américains de la Nouvelle-Angleterre. He was the first secretary of the Société Franco-Américaine du Denier de St-Pierre. He made the historical study French Catholics in the United States for the Catholic Encyclopedia. He was private secretary to the Postmaster General of Canada Pierre-Édouard Blondin, "Nantel" (likely Guillaume-Alphonse Nantel) and minister Alfred Duranleau.

He died on 19 November 1944. He had at least one child; a daughter.
