= François Thibodeau =

Canadian Catholic bishop (1939–2023)

François Thibodeau C.I.M.
- Bishop of Edmundston
- Church: Catholic Church
- Diocese: Diocese of Edmundston
- In office: 22 October 1993 – 5 January 2009
- Predecessor: Gérard Dionne
- Successor: Claude Champagne

Orders
- Ordination: 8 May 1965 by Joseph-Aurèle Plourde
- Consecration: 9 January 1994 by Gérard Dionne

Personal details
- Born: July 27, 1939 Saint-Odilon-de-Cranbourne, Quebec, Canada
- Died: June 26, 2023 (aged 83) Quebec City, Quebec, Canada

François Thibodeau, C.I.M., (July 27, 1939 – June 26, 2023) was a Canadian Roman Catholic prelate and member of the Congregation of Jesus and Mary (C.I.M.), also known as the Eudists. He served as the fifth Bishop of the Roman Catholic Diocese of Edmundston in New Brunswick from his appointment on October 20, 1993, by Pope John Paul II until his retirement in 2009.

Thibodeau was born on July 27, 1939, in Saint-Odilon-de-Cranbourne, Quebec. He studied philosophy at the Sacré-Coeur Seminary in Charlesbourg, Quebec City, and Catholic theology at St. Jean-Eudes Scholasticate in Pointe-Gatineau. Thibodeau was ordained a Catholic priest on May 8, 1965, by Bishop Joseph-Aurèle Plourde of Ottawa. He then received a bachelor's degree in social work from Laval University.

In 1971, Thibodeau was appointed Director of Social Affairs for the Roman Catholic Archdiocese of Quebec, which he held from 1971 to 1986. He then served as editor-in-chief of Pastorale-Québec, the official publication of the Archdiocese of Quebec, from 1986 until 1990.

Thibodeau was appointed the fifth Bishop of the Roman Catholic Diocese of Edmundston on October 20, 1993, and consecrated on January 9, 1994, at the Cathedral of the Immaculate Conception in Saint John, New Brunswick.

Bishop Emeritus François Thibodeau died at the Résidence Domaine Mahonia in Quebec City, Quebec, on June 26, 2023, at the age of 83. He was buried in the crypt of the Cathedral of the Immaculate Conception.
