= St. Aurelie Maine–St. Aurelie Quebec Border Crossing =

Canada–United States border crossing

St. Aurelie Border Crossing
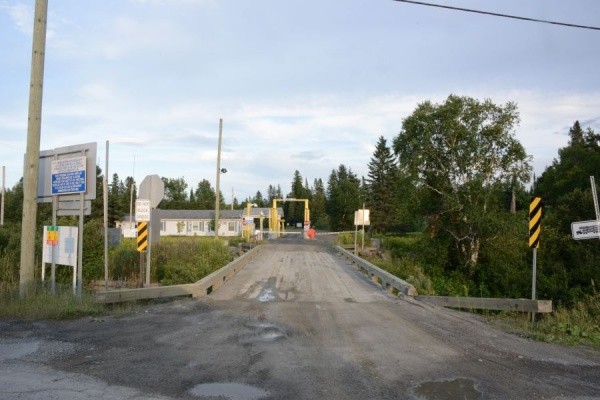
- US Border Inspection Station at St. Aurelie Maine

Locaiton
- Country: United States; Canada
- Location: Near the intersection of Baker Lake Road and R-277; US Port: Baker Lake Road St. Aurelie, ME 04478; Canadian Port: 468 Rang St. Joseph, Sainte-Aurélie, Quebec G0M 1M0
- Coordinates: 46.207458°N 70.276161°W

Details
- Opened: 1972

Website
- http://www.cbp.gov/contact/ports/jackman

The St. Aurelie Maine–St. Aurelie Quebec Border Crossing is a border crossing on the Canada–United States border, located 8 miles east of Saint-Prosper, Quebec. This border crossing exists primarily to accommodate commercial logging operations in the North Maine Woods. The land is commercially owned and the public is generally not permitted to use the logging roads to travel into the United States.

== See also ==
- List of Canada–United States border crossings
