= Quebec Route 276 =

Highway in Quebec, Canada

Route 276

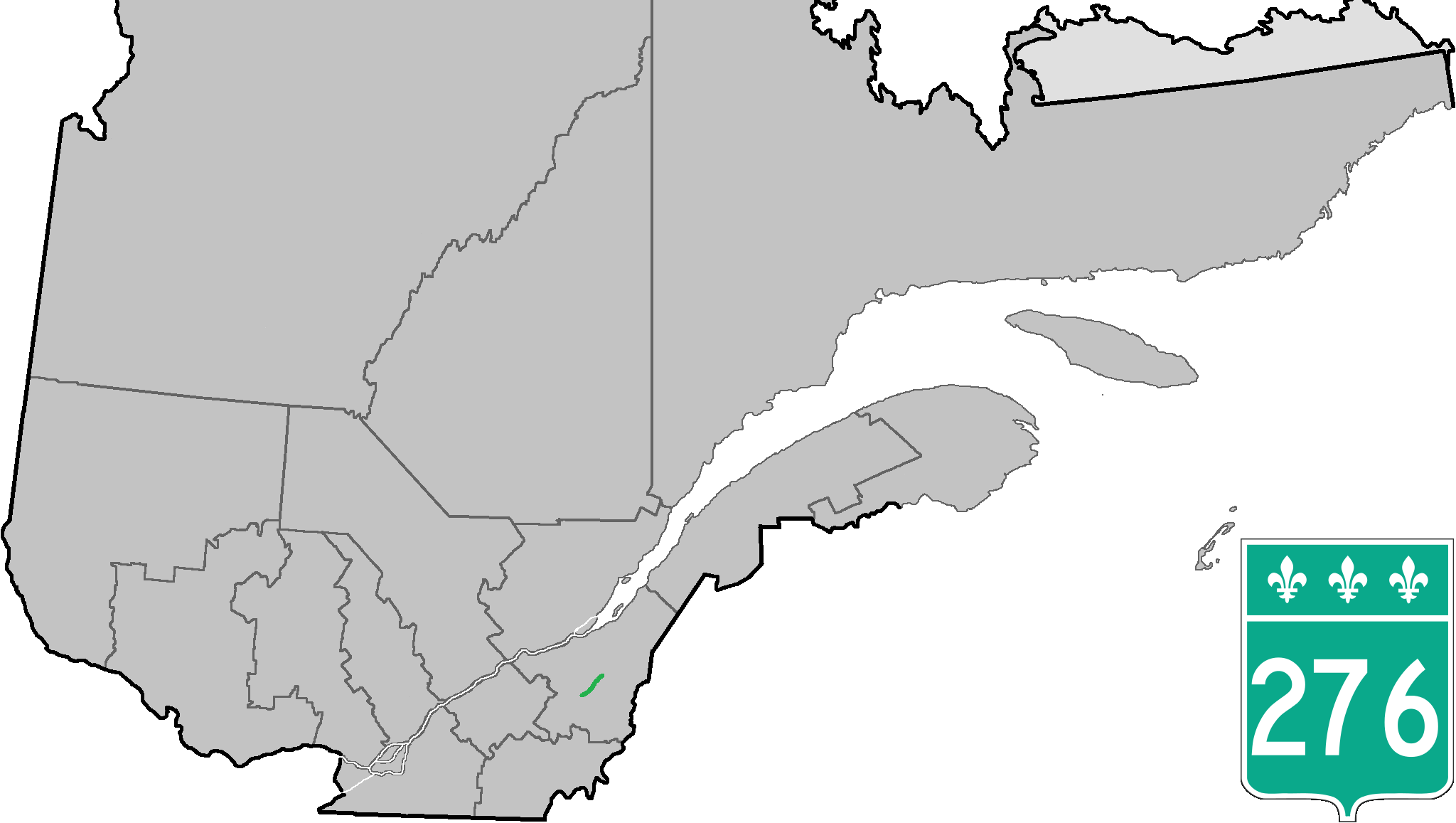

Route information
- Length: 42 km (26 mi)

Major junctions
- South end: R-277 in Lac-Etchemin
- A-73 / R-173 in Saint-Joseph-de-Beauce
- North end: R-112 near Saint-Frédéric

Location
- Country: Canada
- Province: Quebec
- Major cities: Saint-Joseph-de-Beauce

Highway system
- Quebec provincial highways; Autoroutes; List; Former
← R-275	→ R-277

Route 276 is a 42 km two-lane east/west highway on the south shore of the Saint Lawrence River in the Chaudière-Appalaches region of Quebec, Canada. Its eastern terminus is close to Lac-Etchemin at the junction of Route 277, and the western terminus is at the junction of Route 112 in Saint-Frédéric.

== Towns located along Route 276 ==
- Saint-Frédéric
- Saint-Joseph-des-Érables
- Saint-Joseph-de-Beauce
- Saint-Odilon-de-Cranbourne

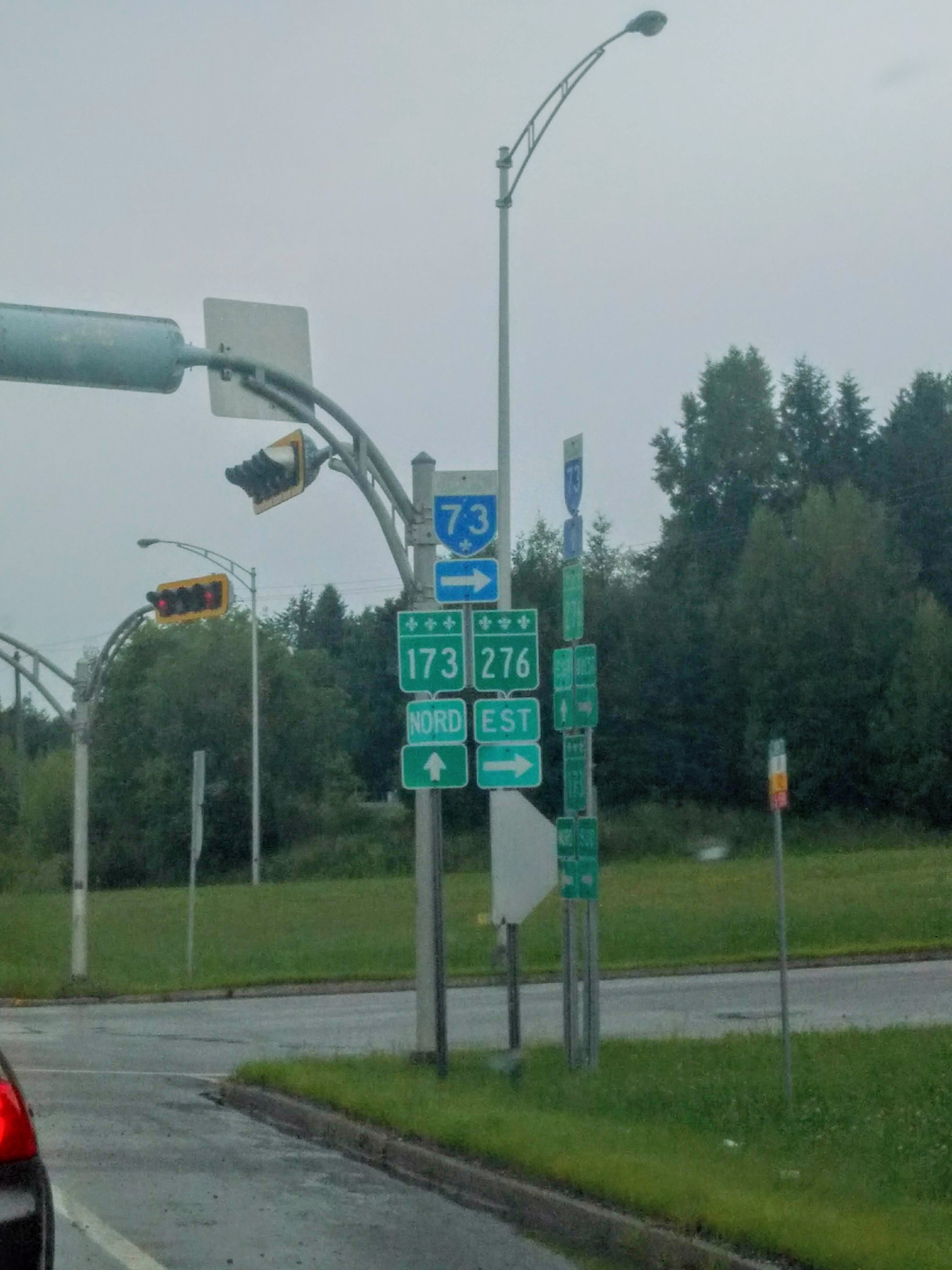
Junction of 276 and 173 in Saint-Joseph.

== See also ==
- List of Quebec provincial highways
