= Jean-Baptiste Rouillard =

Canadian journalist

- Born: May 19, 1842; Quebec City, Quebec, Canada
- Died: October 27, 1908 (aged 66); Fall River, Massachusetts, United States
- Occupations: Journalist, Inspector General of the Mines, Soldier
- Relatives: Joseph Léon Kemner Laflamme (son-in-law)

Jean-Baptiste Rouillard (19 May 1842 – 27 October 1908) was a Canadian journalist, administrator and soldier.

== Biography ==
Jean-Baptiste Rouillard was born on 19 May 1842 to Olivier Rouillard and Catherine Scipion Lalancette in Quebec City. He was baptized on the same day.

In 1862 Rouillard enrolled in the Union army in Swanton. He was part of the 10th Vermont Infantry Regiment. He was promoted corporal on 5 May 1864 and wounded on 19 October 1864. He was promoted to brigadier on the same day. He served until the end of the war (3 June 1865).

Rouillard founded multiple newspaper in Quebec starting in 1884 or 1885 : L'Hochelaga (1884?–1896?), L'Impartial (22 January 1885–1891?), the Courrier des Laurentides (1885?–1898?), Le Patriote (18 September 1886–31 December 1891; also with an English edition, The Patriot), Le Bourru (1886–1886), the Courrier de l'Outaouais (1887-1892), the Gladiator (1887–1891), Le Passepartout (1888-1893) and Le Sud (6 November 1889–1892). He also published the single-page The Richelieu Press (1887–????). He also edited for Le Trait d'Union.

The creation of this large media enterprise seems to be motivated by political rather than financial purposes. Within four years, Rouillard created eight newspaper available in around 20 counties, meaning, to a quarter of Quebec's voters. Rouillard believed that Quebec should unite under one party, leading him to support Honoré Mercier and the Parti national, with a pro-conservative pause between 2 March 1889 and November 1891 due to dissatisfaction with the Parti national.

Rouillard then abandoned his journalistic activities to become inspector general of the mines under the Mercier government with offices in Montreal. During his tenure, he wrote Dix ans de colonisation.

Rouillard was dragged along with the Mercier government's fall, of whom he was a favorite. He was accused of gaining over $30,000 with embezzlement. Hardships, including these political ones, caused him to move to the United States in 1893 with his family.

Jean-Baptiste Rouillard's proposed flag for the U.S. State of Quebec

Rouillard was in support of Canadian annexation to the United States. In 1893 Rouillard made a conference in its support. He believed it would "consolidate Latin influence on the continent" and "emancipate" French descendants. It would unite Québécois with Franco-Americans from New England. Quebec was to become a state, with a flag of the Church's bell tower topped by a beaming cross supported by the gallic rooster with a French blue, white and red background. He also supported the publishing of a large French-Canadian newspaper in Washington.

He lived in multiple cities of New England. In 1893 Rouillard published L'Union Continentale in Boston, a monthly newspaper-magazine, for a few months. Around 1895 he published L'Aigle, a weekly newspaper, at Salem, and, at the same time, the Courrier for Lawrence. In 1896 he was in Biddeford, where he published L'Amérique, and in late 1896, in Lewiston, where he published the République. He later became responsible for copper and gold mines.

During the last years of his life, his wife died and he fell ill. He died in Fall River on 27 October 1908.

== Legacy ==
A commemorative plaque was placed at the "salle Rouillard".
