= Havilland Le Mesurier (British Army officer, born 1783) =

British army officer

- Born: 1783
- Died: 11 July 1813 (aged 29–30)
- Allegiance: United Kingdom
- Service / branch: British Army
- Rank: Colonel

Colonel Havilland Le Mesurier (1783 – 31 July 1813) was a British army officer. He was the eldest son of merchant and commissary officer Havilland Le Mesurier and his wife Elizabeth Dobrée (? - 1804). He was educated at school in Salisbury and later at Westminster School.

In January 1801 he entered the Royal Staff Corps as an ensign, and progressed steadily. He became deputy assistant quartermaster-general to Sir John Moore in Sweden, and also at the Battle of Corunna. He also was present at the Battle of Fuentes de Oñoro.

In 1811 he was appointed Portuguese military secretary to the Duke of Wellington. He was promoted to colonel, shortly before his death during the Battle of the Pyrenees. He was shot through the head on 28 July 1813, dying on the 31st.

In 1809 he published a translation of Considérations sur la Guerre, et particulièrement sur la dernière guerre, a military book written by the French general Guillaume Latrille de Lorencez.

== Works ==
- Reflections on Modern War, by the French General Latrille; Translated from the Original by Major Havilland Le Mesurier, Serving on the General Staff in Portugal (1809) ( French original])
