= Mont Orignal =

Mountain in Quebec, Canada

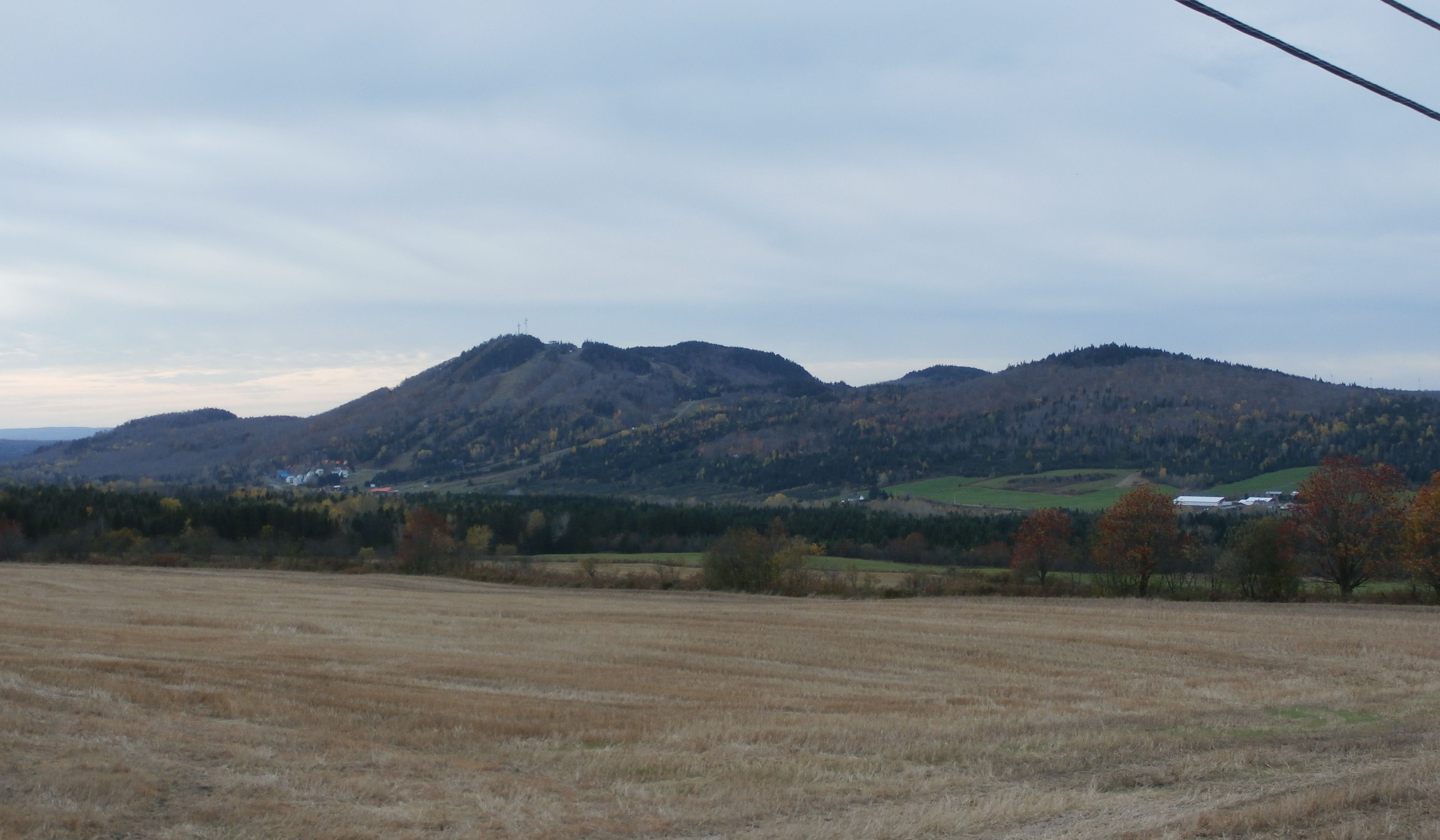
- Interactive map of Mont Orignal
- Location: Lac-Etchemin, Quebec, Canada
- Nearest city: Quebec City, 100 km (62 mi)
- Coordinates: 46°24′43″N 70°35′12″W
- Vertical: 300 m (980 ft)
- Top elevation: 612 m (2,008 ft)
- Base elevation: 312 m (1,024 ft)
- Skiable area: 110 acres (45 ha)
- Trails: 23 total 14% Easy; 19% Intermediate; 57% Difficult; 10% Expert
- Longest run: 1.8 km (1.1 mi)
- Lift system: 3 total 1 detachable six packs 2 surface lift
- Lift capacity: 4,500 skiers/hr
- Terrain parks: Yes
- Snowmaking: 100%
- Night skiing: 11 tracks
- Website: Mont Orignal

Mont Orignal is a ski mountain about 100 km south of Quebec City, Canada in the region of Bellechasse near the village of Lac-Etchemin.

== Description ==
Mont Orignal is a winter resort located not far from Lac Etchemin. It offers many winter activities like alpine skiing, cross-country skiing (54 km of classic / free skating trail) and snow tubing (three runs). Mont Orignal also offers the possibility to rent fully equipped cottage. Mont Orignal is the world's first mountain to be equipped with a high-speed six pack chairlift, which was built in 1991. Mont Orignal is also one of only three mountains in Quebec to have a high-speed six pack along with Le Relais' 2016-built chairlift, and Sommet Saint-Sauveur's 2019 Sommet Express lift (if excluding Orford's and Bromont's 6/8 hybrid lifts). It maintains the largest snowpark in the province of Quebec. Several competitions were held in Moose Park (Mont Orignal snowpark) like the Jib Academy, a competition for teens under 16 years.

A shuttle service links many cities of the south shore of the St.Lawrence to the station: the "Ski-Bus du Mont-Orignal".

== See also ==
- Mont-Sainte-Anne
- Stoneham
- List of ski areas and resorts in Canada
