= Quebec Route 277 =

Highway in Quebec, Canada

Route 277

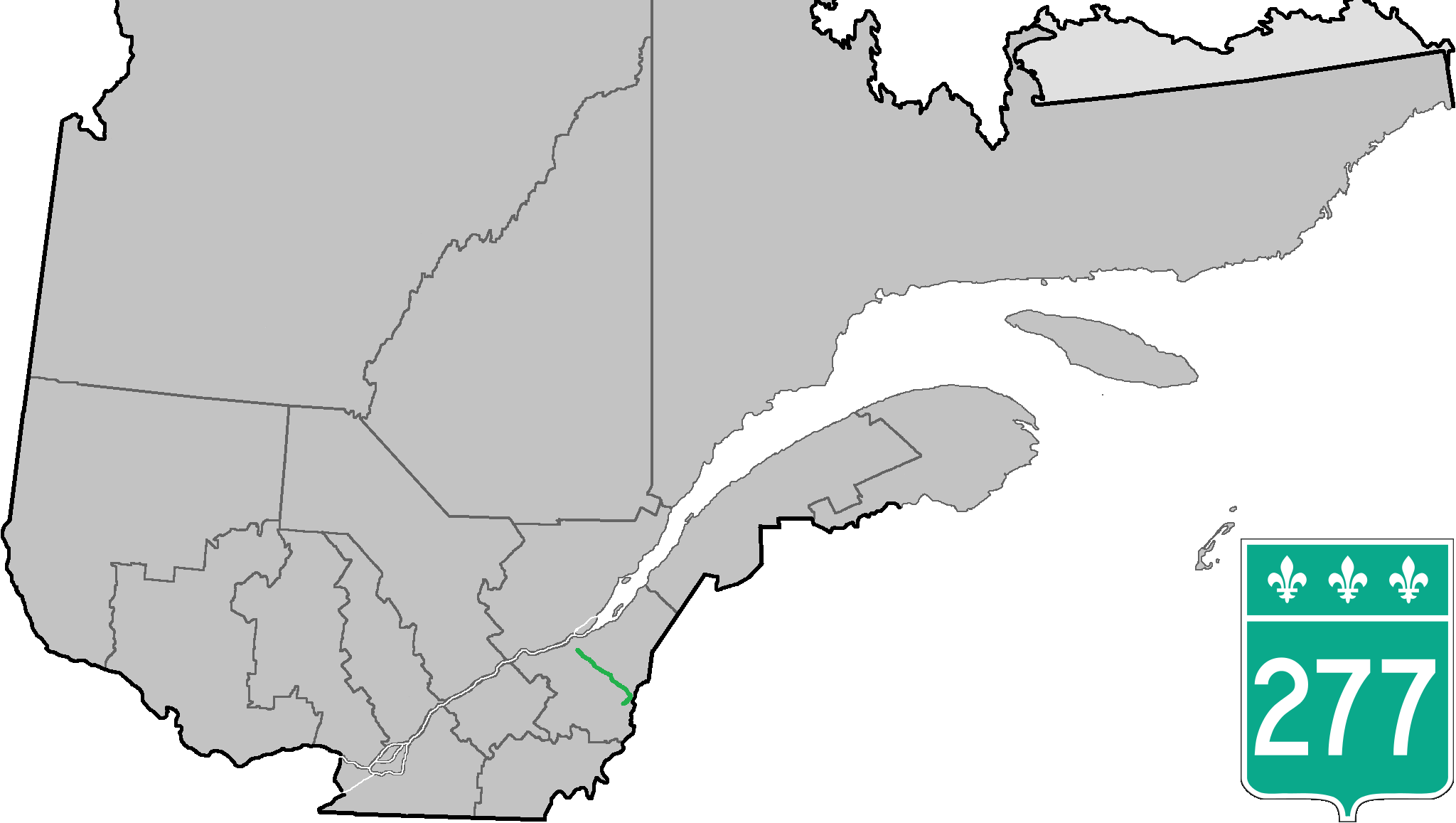

Route information
- Length: 101 km (63 mi)

Major junctions
- South end: R-275 in Sainte-Aurélie
- North end: R-173 in St-Henri-de-Levis

Location
- Country: Canada
- Province: Quebec
- Major cities: Saint-Henri-de-Levis, Lac-Etchemin, Saint-Louis-de-Gonzague

Highway system
- Quebec provincial highways; Autoroutes; List; Former
← R-276	→ R-279

Route 277 is a two-lane north–south highway in the Chaudière-Appalaches region in the province of Quebec, Canada. Its northern terminus is in Saint-Henri at the junction of Route 173 and its southern terminus is in Sainte-Aurélie at the junction of Route 275.

== Towns along Route 277 ==
- Saint-Henri-de-Levis
- Saint-Anselme
- Sainte-Claire
- Saint-Malachie
- Saint-Leon de Standon
- Lac-Etchemin
- Sainte-Rose-de-Watford
- Saint-Louis-de-Gonzague
- Sainte-Aurélie
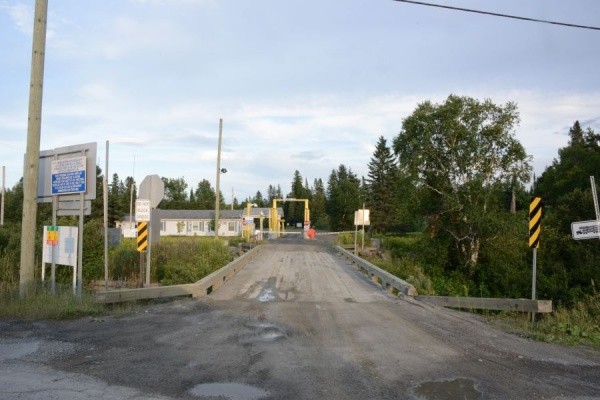
United States port of entry right off Route 277 in Sainte-Aurélie.

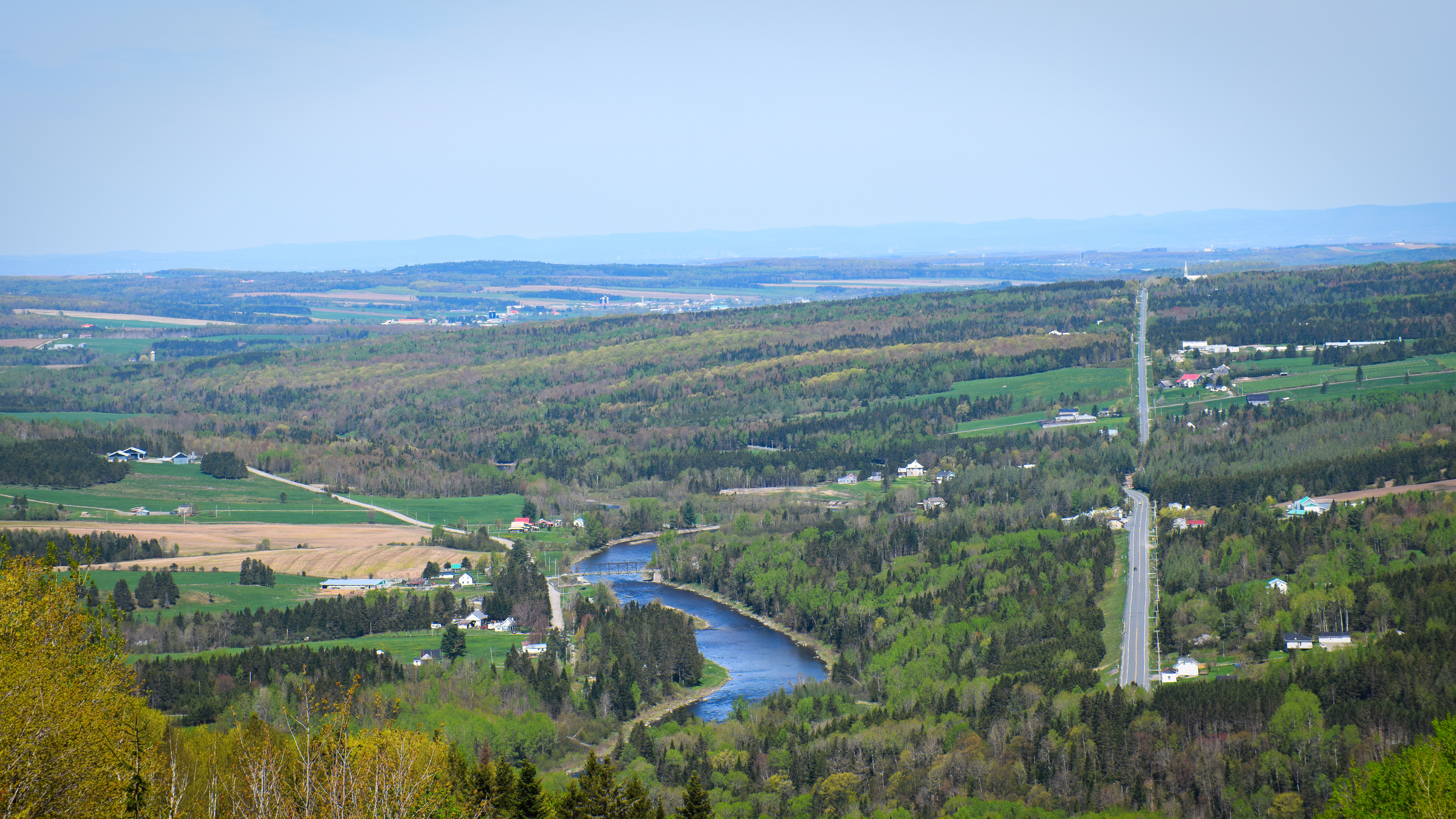
Route 277 along Etchemin River in Saint-Malachie.

== See also ==
- List of Quebec provincial highways
