= Saint-Isidore, Chaudière-Appalaches =

Saint-Isidore
- Municipality
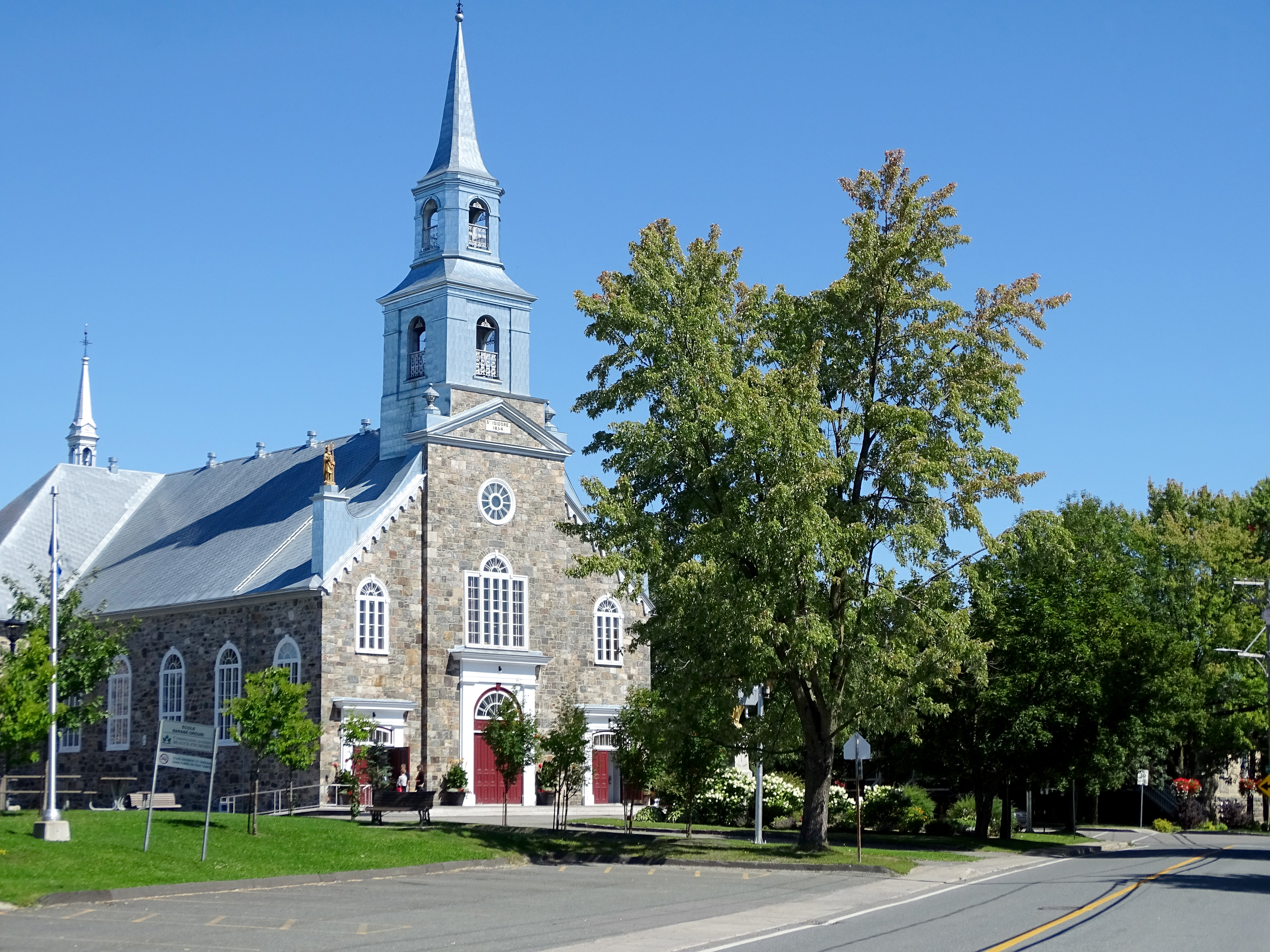
- Church of Saint-Isidore

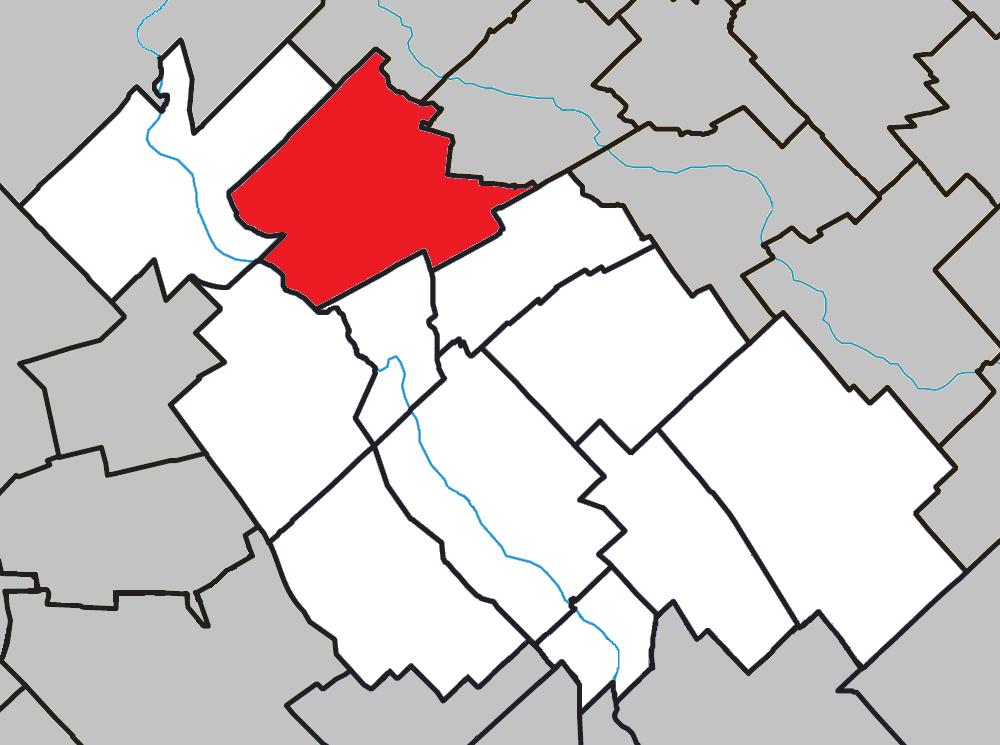
- Location within La Nouvelle-Beauce RCM

- Location in southern Quebec
- Coordinates: 46°35′N 71°06′W
- Country: Canada
- Province: Quebec
- Region: Chaudière-Appalaches
- RCM: La Nouvelle-Beauce
- Constituted: September 22, 1993

Government
  - Mayor: Réal Turgeon
  - Federal riding: Beauce
  - Prov. riding: Beauce-Nord

Area
  - Total: 102.40 km^{2} (39.54 sq mi)
  - Land: 102.61 km^{2} (39.62 sq mi)
- There is an apparent contradiction between two authoritative sources.

Population (2021)
  - Total: 3,286
  - Density: 32/km^{2} (83/sq mi)
  - Pop 2016-2021: ▲14.1%
  - Dwellings: 1,406
- Time zone: UTC−5 (EST)
  - Summer (DST): UTC−4 (EDT)
- Postal code(s): G0S 2S0
- Area codes: 418 and 581
- Highways A-73: R-173; R-275
- Website: www.saint-isidore.net

Saint-Isidore (French pronunciation: [sɛ̃t‿izidɔʁ]) is a municipality in La Nouvelle-Beauce Regional County Municipality in the Chaudière-Appalaches region of Quebec, Canada. Its population was 3,286 as of the Canada 2021 Census. Founded in 1855, it is named after Isidore of Seville.
