= Saint-Zacharie, Quebec =

Saint-Zacharie
- Municipality
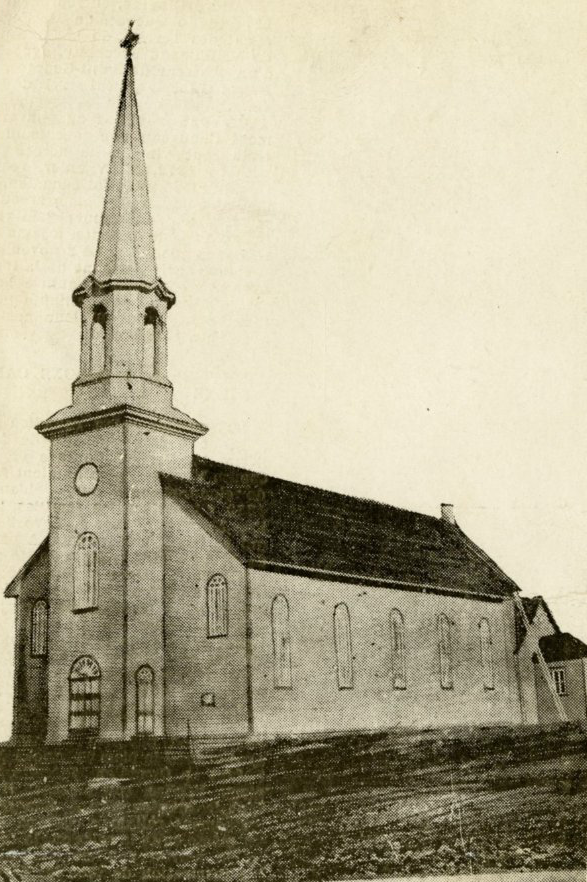
- The church in 1910.

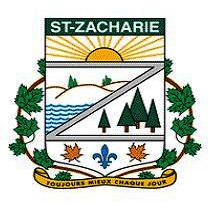
- Coat of arms

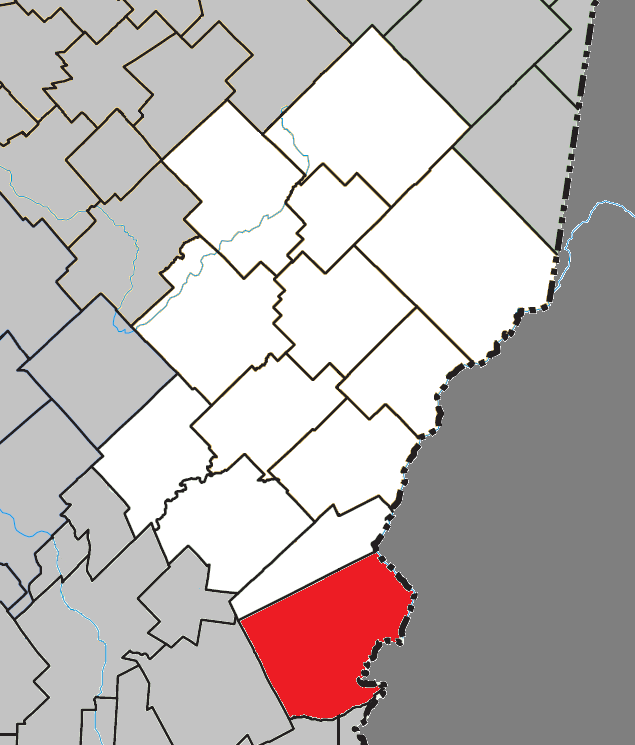
- Location within Les Etchemins RCM.

- Location in southern Quebec.
- Coordinates: 46°08′N 70°22′W
- Country: Canada
- Province: Quebec
- Region: Chaudière-Appalaches
- RCM: Les Etchemins
- Constituted: April 18, 1990

Government
  - Mayor: Camil Cloutier
  - Federal riding: Beauce
  - Prov. riding: Beauce-Sud

Area
  - Total: 188.80 km^{2} (72.90 sq mi)
  - Land: 186.56 km^{2} (72.03 sq mi)

Population (2021)
  - Total: 1,684
  - Density: 9/km^{2} (23/sq mi)
  - Pop 2016-2021: ▲1.9%
  - Dwellings: 825
- Time zone: UTC−5 (EST)
  - Summer (DST): UTC−4 (EDT)
- Postal code(s): G0M 2C0
- Area codes: 418 and 581
- Highways: R-275
- Website: www.st-zacharie.qc.ca

Saint-Zacharie (French pronunciation: [sɛ̃ zakaʁi]) is a municipality in the Municipalité régionale de comté des Etchemins in Quebec, Canada. It is part of the Chaudière-Appalaches region and the population is 1,684 as of 2021. The new constitution dates from 1990, when the township municipality and the village municipality of Saint-Zacharie amalgamated, but the area was settled as early as 1873.

Saint-Zacharie is named after Zacharie Lacasse, an Oblate missionary who brought settlers to the area in 1881.

Saint-Zacharie is located on the Canada–United States border and has a small border crossing for traffic coming from the United States, St. Zacharie Crossing.

== History ==
Saint-Zacharie was founded 31 October 1885 under the name Metgermette-Nord. In 1909, the municipality was split in two sections, the northern section eventually becoming Sainte-Aurélie. In 1932, Metgermette-Nord changed its name to Saint-Zacharie. In 1961, the village of Saint-Zacharie was split from the rest of the municipality but was eventually remerged in 1990.
