= Lac-Etchemin =

- Municipality
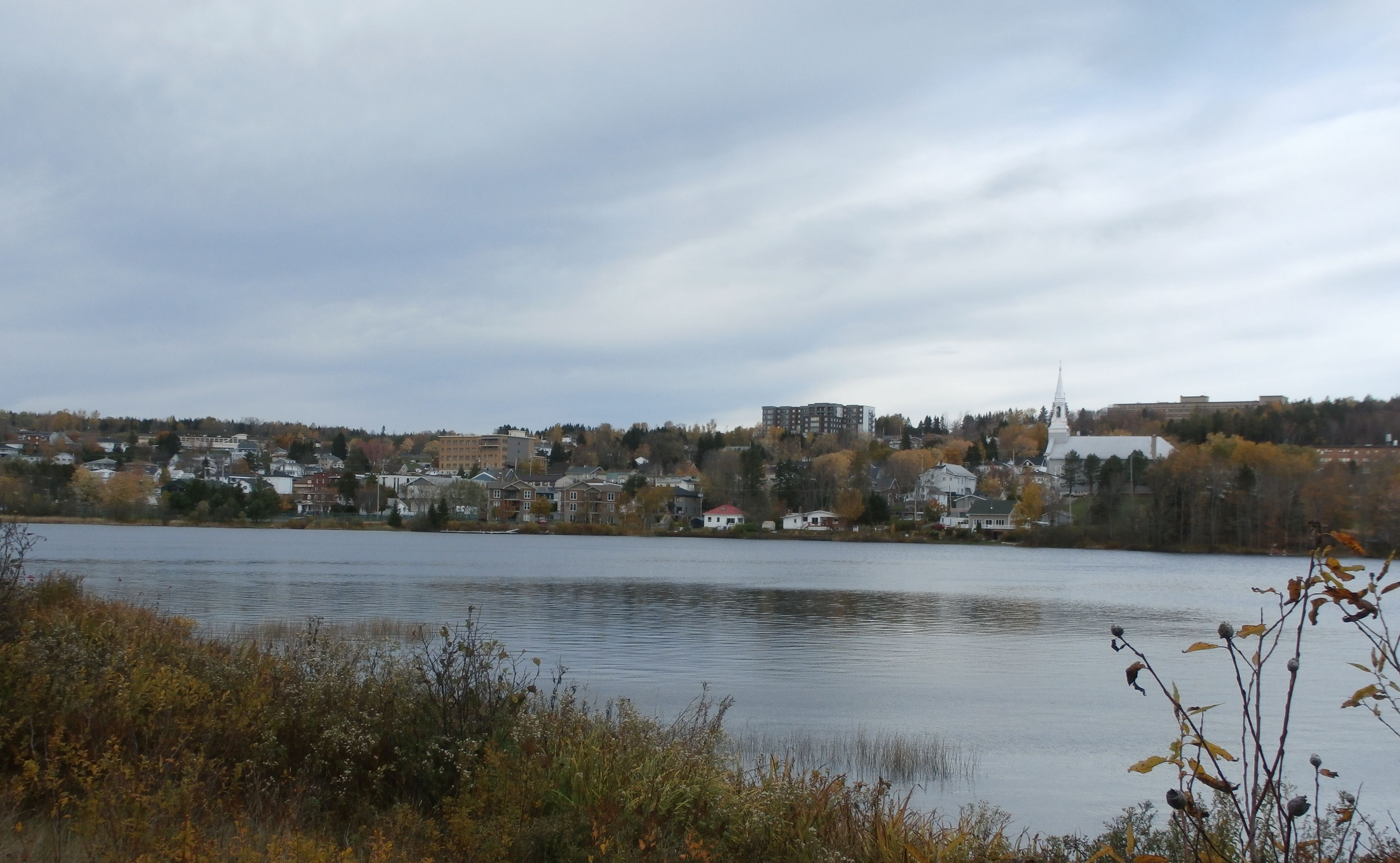
- Lac-Etchemin seen from the lake

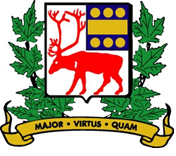
- Coat of arms

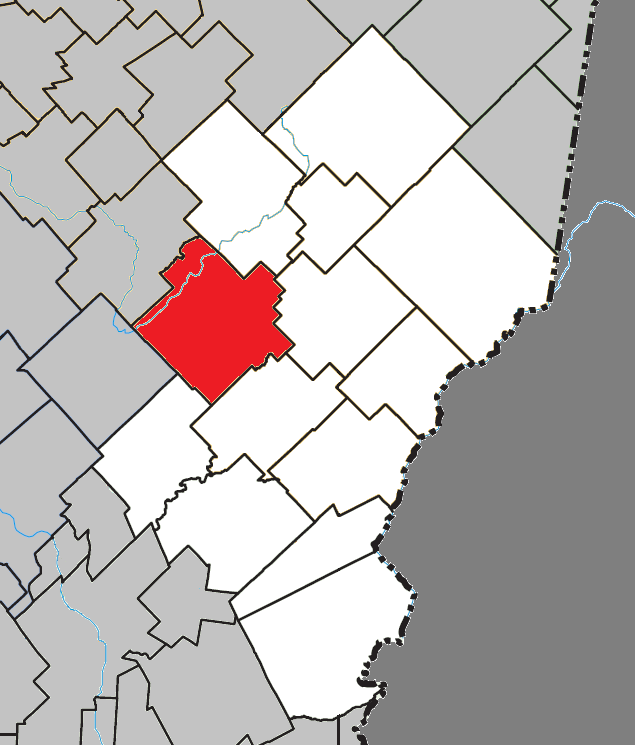
- Location within Les Etchemins RCM.

- Location in southern Quebec.
- Coordinates: 46°24′N 70°30′W
- Country: Canada
- Province: Quebec
- Region: Chaudière-Appalaches
- RCM: Les Etchemins
- Constituted: October 10, 2001

Government
  - Mayor: Joan Gagnon
  - Federal riding: Bellechasse—Les Etchemins—Lévis
  - Prov. riding: Bellechasse

Area
  - Municipality: 161.60 km^{2} (62.39 sq mi)
  - Land: 157.22 km^{2} (60.70 sq mi)
  - Urban: 1.65 km^{2} (0.64 sq mi)

Population (2021)
  - Municipality: 4,028
  - Density: 25.6/km^{2} (66/sq mi)
  - Urban: 1,769
  - Urban density: 1,072.1/km^{2} (2,777/sq mi)
  - Pop 2016-2021: ▲5.4%
  - Dwellings: 2,075
- Time zone: UTC−5 (EST)
  - Summer (DST): UTC−4 (EDT)
- Postal code(s): G0R 1S0
- Area codes: 418 and 581
- Highways: R-276; R-277
- Website: lac-etchemin.ca

Lac-Etchemin (French pronunciation: [lak ɛtʃəmɛ̃]) is a municipality in and the seat of the Municipalité régionale de comté des Etchemins in Quebec, Canada. It is part of the Chaudière-Appalaches region and the population is 4,028 as of 2021. It takes its name from Etchemin Lake, at the centre of the municipality. "Etchemin" means "men, human beings" in Abenaki language.

Lac-Etchemin is home to winter resort Mont Orignal and the birthplace of controversial religious Community of the Lady of All Nations.

== History ==
The area near Etchemin Lake was first described in 1828 as lovely by the surveyor Emmanuel. A few years later, in 1835, the region sees its first settler, Commissary General Sir Randolph Isham Routh KCB (1782–1858), who was given a land grant of 9,000 acres (36 km^{2}) for his services to the Crown.

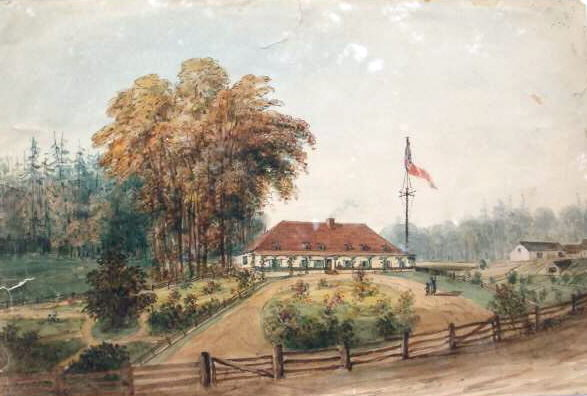
Sir Randolph Isham Routh's Lac Etchemin Summer Residence 1838, painted by his second wife, Marie Louise Taschereau (1811–1891)

The new municipality of Lac-Etchemin was created in 2001 following the amalgamation of the city of Lac-Etchemin and the parish of Sainte-Germaine-du-Lac-Etchemin.

== Notable people ==
- Joseph-Damase Bégin, Quebec politician
- Denis Bernard, actor and producer
- Marie-Michèle Gagnon, World Cup alpine ski racer

== See also ==
- Etchemin River, a stream
- Daaquam River, a stream
- List of municipalities in Quebec
