= Havilland Le Mesurier =

British merchant and commissary officer

- Born: May 8, 1758
- Died: March 5, 1806 (aged 47)
- Allegiance: Kingdom of Great Britain; United Kingdom of Great Britain and Ireland
- Branch: British Army
- Rank: Commissary-General
- Spouse(s): Elizabeth Dobrée (d. 1804)

Commissary-General Havilland Le Mesurier (1758–1806) was a British merchant and commissary officer who also published on military matters.

He was born on 8 May 1758 in Guernsey. His parents were John Le Mesurier (1717–1793), hereditary Governor of Alderney, and his wife Martha (d. 1764). His brother was Paul Le Mesurier, an MP and Lord Mayor of London.

He attended Winchester School from 1770 to 1771, before joining the business of his father and eldest brother. They ran a merchant house that profited from privateering in the American War of Independence. In 1782 he married Elizabeth Dobrée of Guernsey (died 1804).

After war broke out with France in 1793, and with his business suffering as a result, Le Mesurier took a commission in the army sent to assist the Dutch. He was promoted swiftly to deputy commissary-general, winning praise for his hard work during the winter of 1794–5. After he returned from the continent, he set up anew as a merchant with another brother.

In 1797, he was appointed commissary-general of southern England, in response to the threat of invasion. He resigned in 1800, when the post of commissary-general of all England went to Brook Watson, with whom he had worked during the Dutch campaign but whom he did not respect. In 1801, with a new government in place, Le Mesurier was appointed as commissary-general to the army preparing to return from Egypt, and also saw service in Naples and Malta.

He died on 5 March 1806, leaving a widow and five children. His eldest son was also a military officer, Colonel Havilland Le Mesurier.

== Works ==
- A System for the British Commissariat on Foreign Service (1796)
- The British Commissary (1798)
- Thoughts on a French Invasion (1798)
- Two Letters to the Commissioners of Army Accounts (1806)
