= Quebec Route 275 =

Highway in Quebec, Canada

Route 275

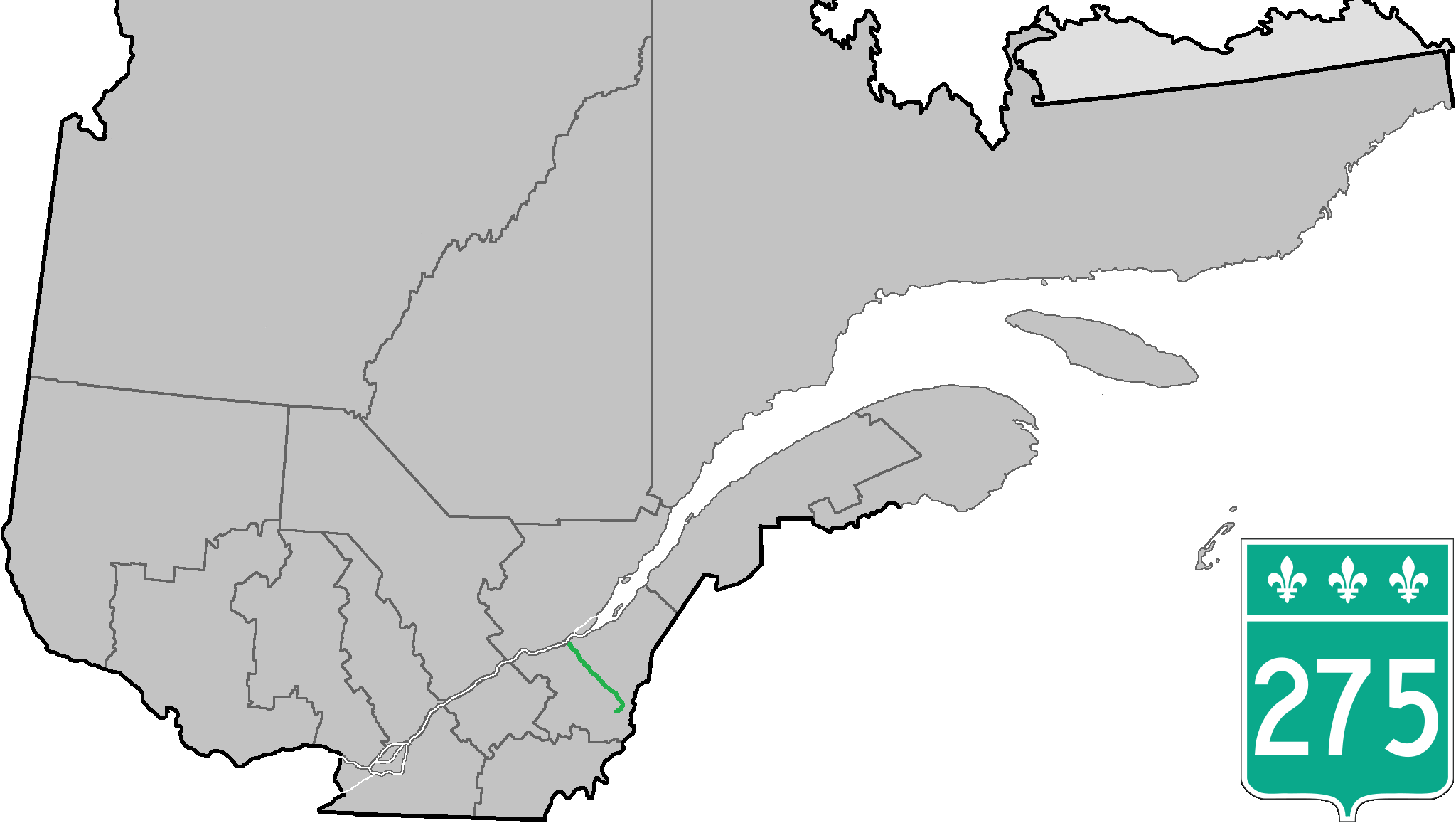

Route information
- Length: 132 km (82 mi)

Major junctions
- South end: R-173 in Saint-Côme–Linière
- R-112 in Frampton; R-173 in Saint-Isidore; A-20 (TCH) in Saint-Jean-Chrysostome
- North end: R-132 in Saint-Romuald (Lévis)

Location
- Country: Canada
- Province: Quebec
- Major cities: Saint-Romuald (Lévis), Saint-Jean-Chrysostome (Lévis), Saint-Côme–Linière

Highway system
- Quebec provincial highways; Autoroutes; List; Former
← R-273	→ R-276

Route 275 is a two-lane north/south highway in the Chaudière-Appalaches region in the province of Quebec. Its northern terminus is in Saint-Romuald, now part of Lévis at the junction of Route 132 and its southern terminus is in Saint-Côme–Linière at the junction of Route 173.

== Towns along Route 275 ==
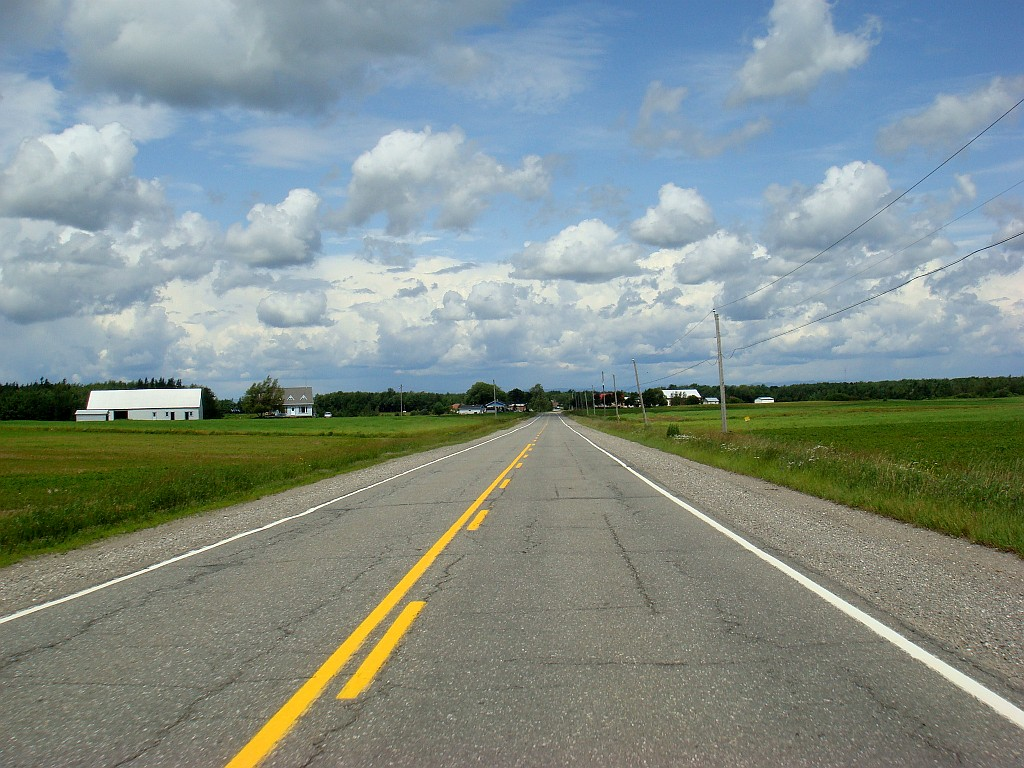
Quebec Route 275 in Saint-Isidore

- Saint-Côme–Linière
- Saint-Zacharie
- Saint-Prosper
- Saint-Benjamin
- Saint-Odilon-de-Cranbourne
- Sainte-Marguerite
- Sainte-Hénédine
- Saint-Isidore
- Saint-Jean-Chrysostome (Lévis)
- Saint-Romuald (Lévis)
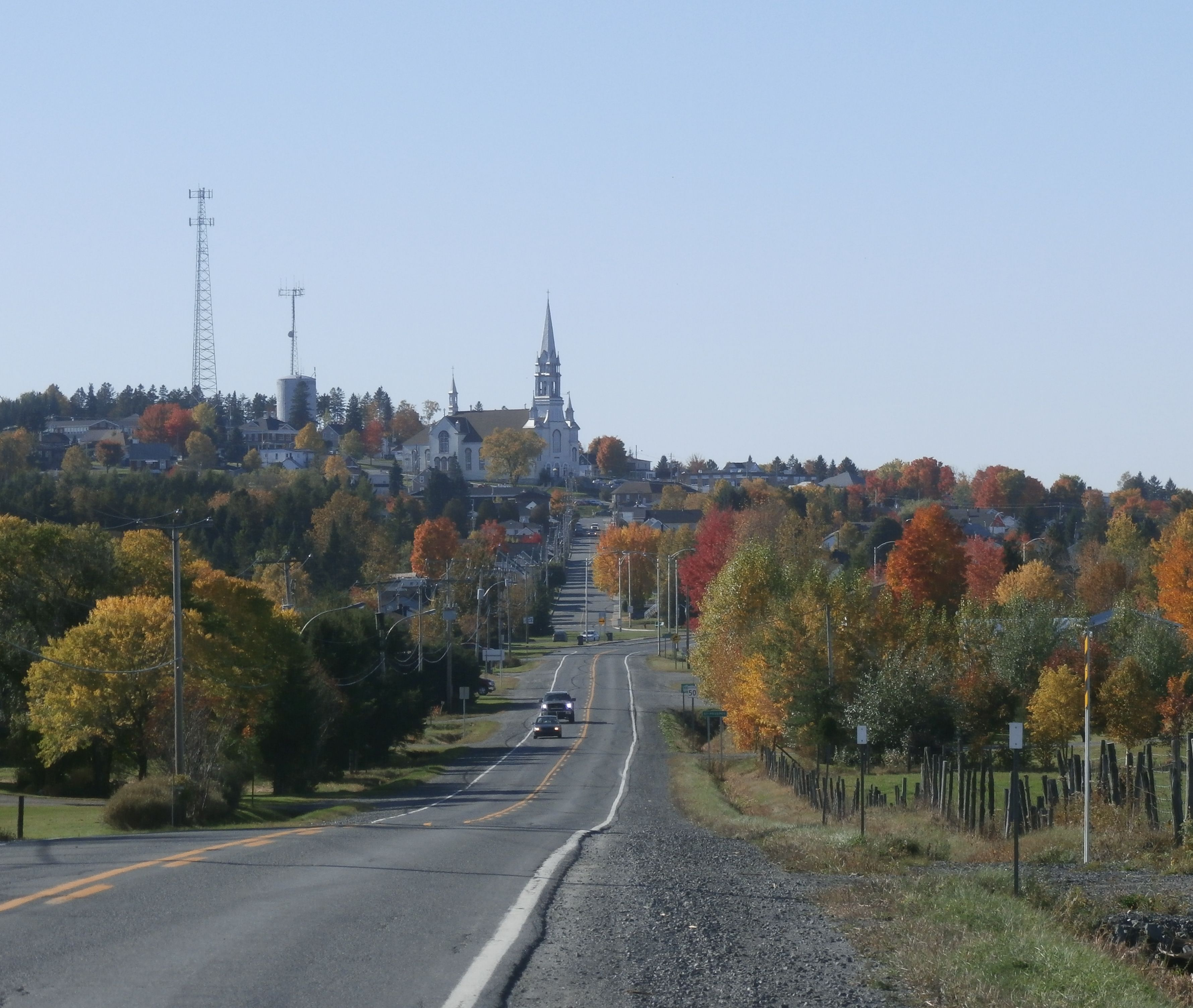
Entering Saint-Prosper.

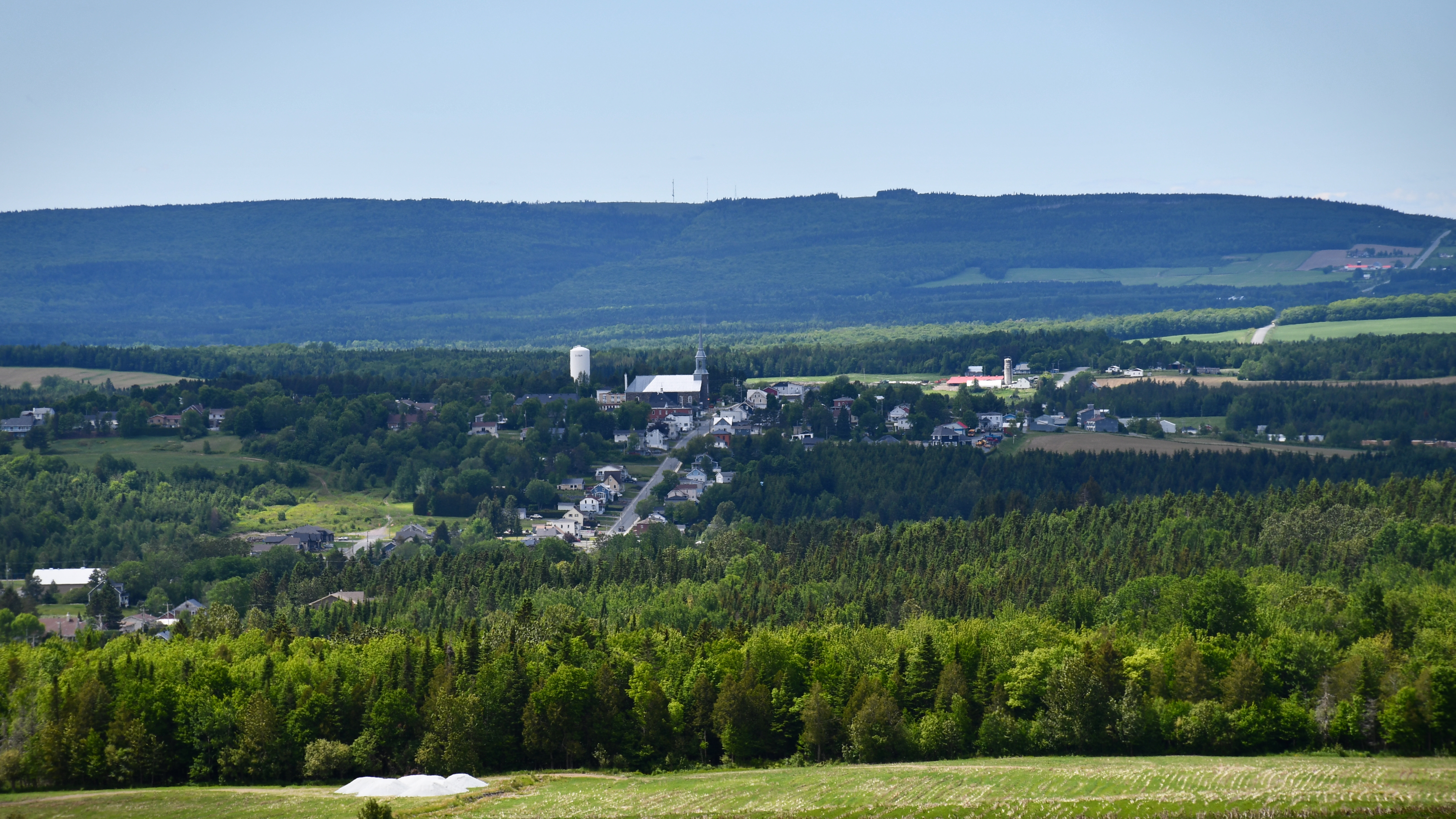
Route 275 through Saint-Odilon describes a straight line over hills and valleys.

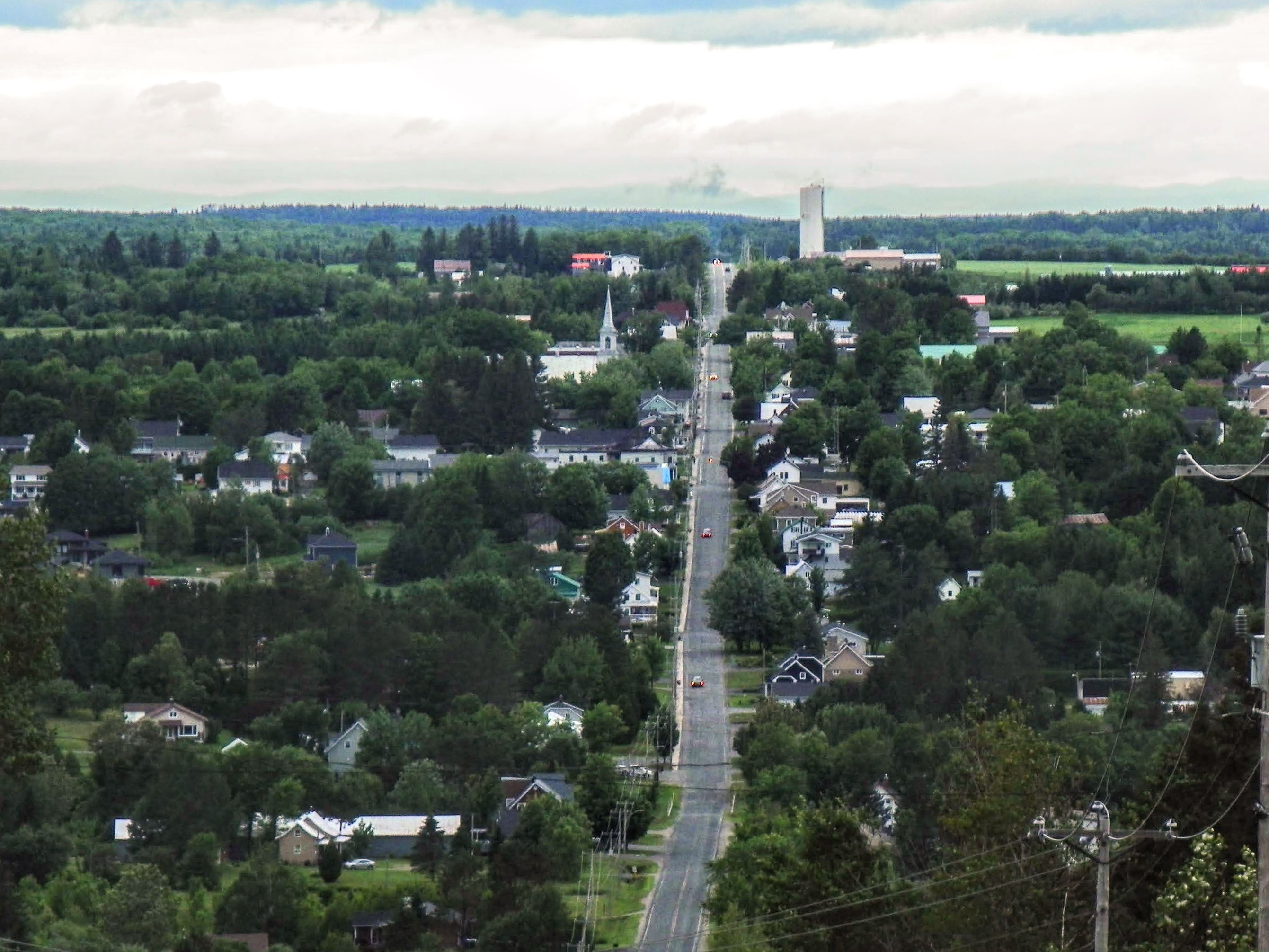
Route 275 in Frampton.

== See also ==
- List of Quebec provincial highways
