= Gérard Dionne =

Canadian Roman Catholic bishop (1919–2020)

The Most Reverend Gérard Dionne
- Bishop of the Edmundston Diocese
- Church: Roman Catholic Church
- See: Diocese of Edmundston
- In office: 1983–1993
- Predecessor: Fernand Lacroix
- Successor: François Thibodeau
- Previous posts: Auxiliary Bishop of Diocese of Sault Sainte Marie, Ontario; Bishop

Orders
- Ordination: 1 May 1948

Personal details
- Born: 19 June 1919 Saint-Basile, New Brunswick Canada
- Died: 13 May 2020 (aged 100) Edmundston, New Brunswick, Canada

Gérard Dionne (19 June 1919 – 13 May 2020) was a Canadian Bishop of the Roman Catholic Church and the oldest Roman Catholic Bishop of Canada.

== Biography ==
Dionne was born in Saint-Basile, New Brunswick and ordained a priest in Edmundston on 1 May 1948. He was appointed auxiliary bishop of the Diocese of Sault Sainte Marie, Ontario as well as Titular bishop of Garba on 29 January 1975 and consecrated on 8 April 1975. On 26 November 1983 he was appointed bishop of the Edmundston Diocese (installed on 29 January 1984) where he remained until his resignation on 20 October 1993.

In November 2009 a Canadian judge determined that Dionne thwarted a 1983 police investigation into child abuse allegations surrounding Father Bernard Cloutier. He turned 100 in June 2019.
