= Diocese of Edmundston =

Catholic ecclesiastical territory

Coordinates: 47.3629°N 68.3322°W

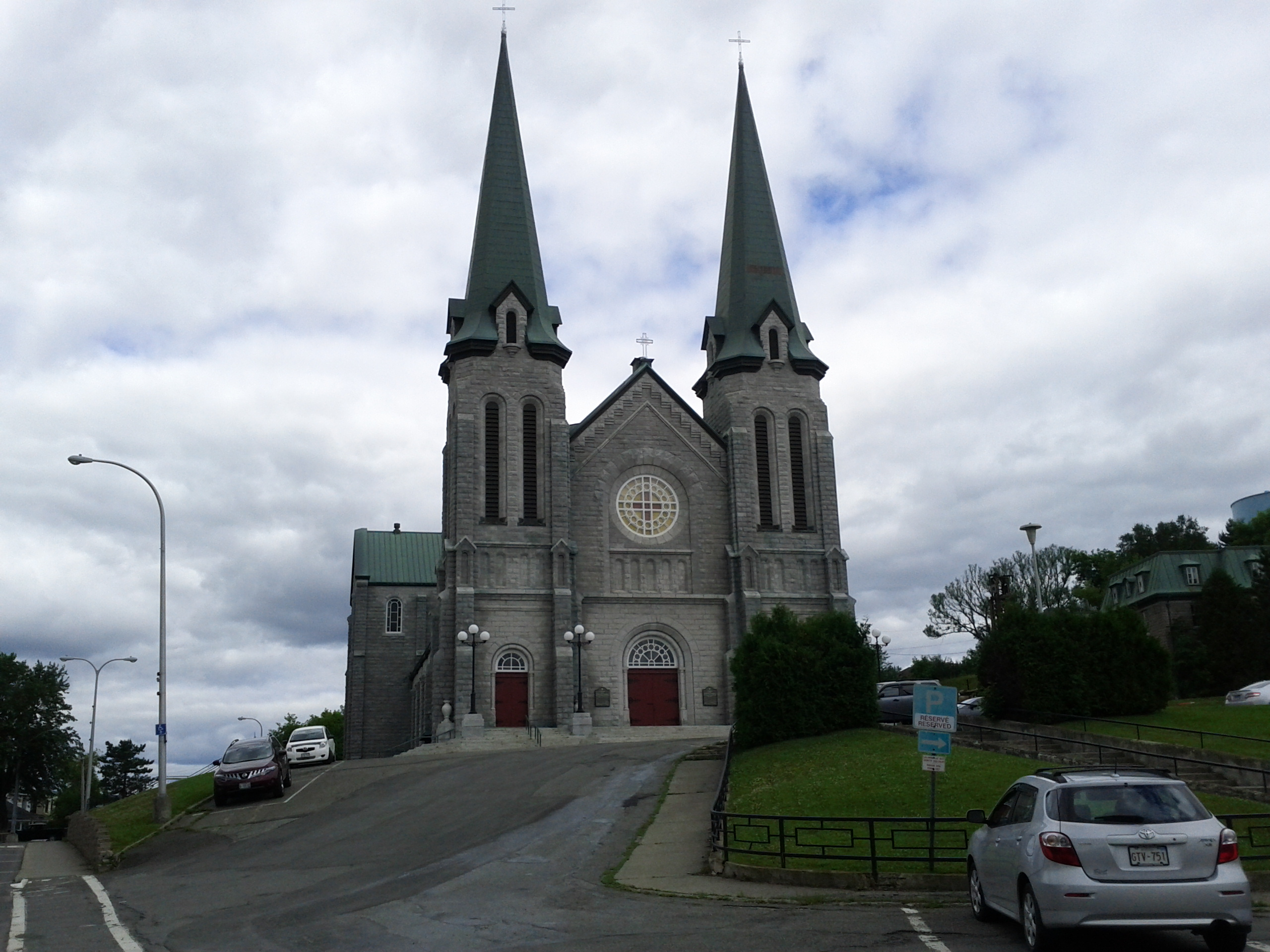
- Cathedral of the Immaculate Conception

Location
- Country: Canada
- Population: 49,400 (95.7%)

Information
- Denomination: Roman Catholic
- Rite: Roman Rite
- Established: 16 December 1944
- Cathedral: Cathedral of the Immaculate Conception

Current leadership
- Pope: Leo XIV
- Bishop: Claude Champagne, O.M.I. (2009- present)

Map

Website
- diocese-edmundston.ca/en/welcome.html

The Diocese of Edmundston, (Latin: Dioecesis Edmundstonensis, French: Diocèse d'Edmundston) is a Latin Church ecclesiastical territory or diocese of the Catholic Church in New Brunswick, Canada. The diocese was erected 16 December 1944. The Diocese of Edmundston is a suffragan diocese in the ecclesiastical province of the metropolitan Archdiocese of Moncton.

== Bishops ==
=== Ordinaries ===
- Marie-Antoine Roy, O.F.M. (1945–1948)
- Joseph-Roméo Gagnon (1949–1970)
- Fernand Lacroix, C.I.M. (1970–1983)
- Gérard Dionne (1983–1993)
- François Thibodeau, C.I.M. (1993–2009) - Bishop Emeritus
- Claude Champagne, O.M.I. (2009–present)

=== Other priest of this diocese who became bishop ===
- Joseph-Aurèle Plourde, appointed Auxiliary Bishop of Alexandria in Ontario in 1964

== External links and references ==
- Diocese of Edmundston official site
- "Diocese of Edmundston". Catholic-Hierarchy.
