= Saint-Prosper, Quebec =

Saint-Prosper
- Municipality
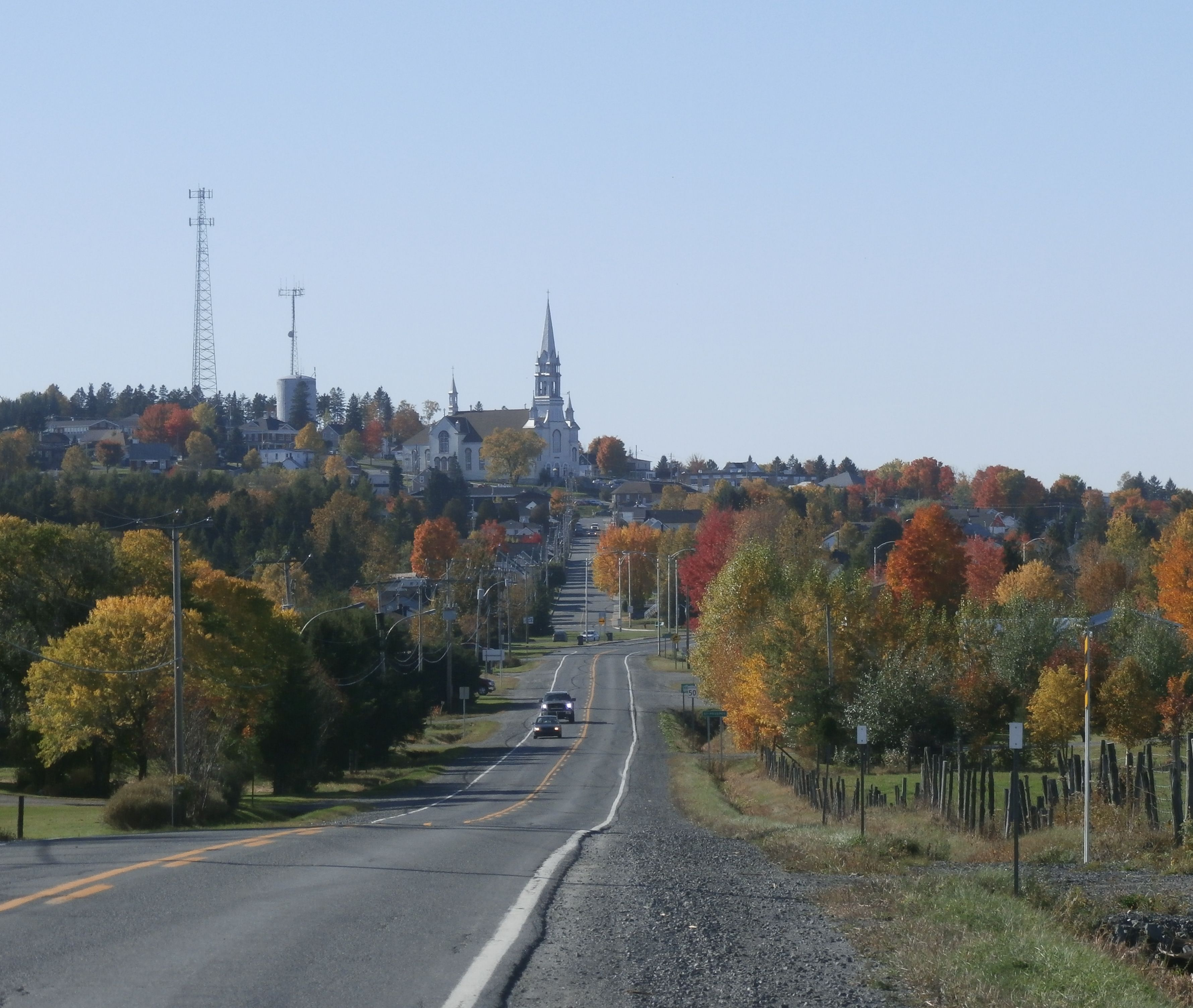

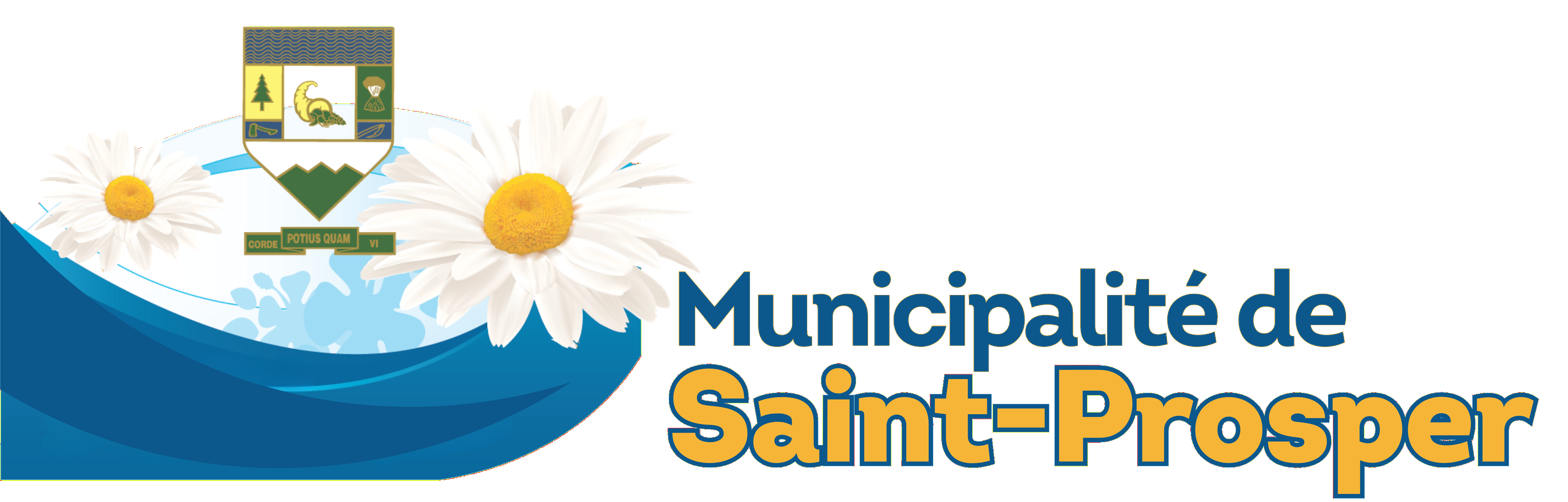
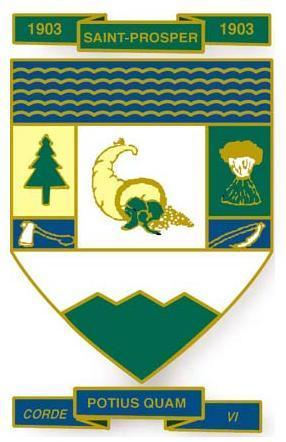
- Seal Coat of arms
- Motto: Corde Potius Quam Vi
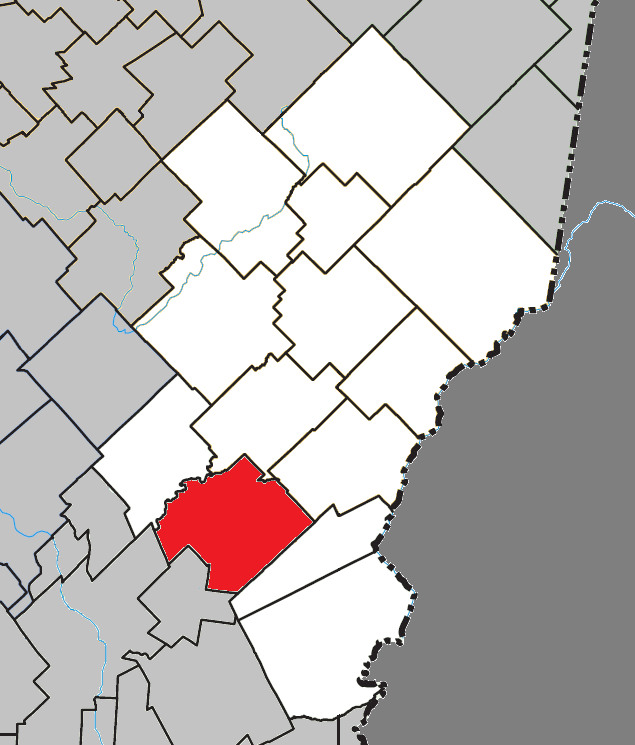
- Location within Les Etchemins RCM

- Location in southern Quebec
- Coordinates: 46°13′N 70°29′W
- Country: Canada
- Province: Quebec
- Region: Chaudière-Appalaches
- RCM: Les Etchemins
- Constituted: September 26, 1887

Government
  - Mayor: Alain Maheux
  - Federal riding: Beauce
  - Prov. riding: Beauce-Sud

Area
  - Municipality: 134.10 km^{2} (51.78 sq mi)
  - Land: 133.74 km^{2} (51.64 sq mi)
  - Urban: 2.23 km^{2} (0.86 sq mi)

Population (2021)
  - Municipality: 3,596
  - Density: 26.9/km^{2} (70/sq mi)
  - Urban: 2,006
  - Urban density: 897.6/km^{2} (2,325/sq mi)
  - Pop 2016-2021: ▲0.2%
  - Dwellings: 1,646
- Time zone: UTC−5 (EST)
  - Summer (DST): UTC−4 (EDT)
- Postal code(s): G0M 1Y0
- Area codes: 418 and 581
- Highways: R-204; R-275
- Website: www.saint-prosper.com

Saint-Prosper (French pronunciation: [sɛ̃ pʁɔspɛʁ]) is a municipality in Les Etchemins Regional County Municipality in Quebec, Canada. It is part of the Chaudière-Appalaches region and the population is 3,596 as of 2021. It is named after Reverend Prosper-Marcel Meunier, first priest of the parish. It is sometimes known as Saint-Prosper-de-Dorchester.

== Notable people ==
- Fabien Roy, Canadian politician
