= Sainte-Marguerite, Québec =

Sainte-Marguerite
- Parish municipality
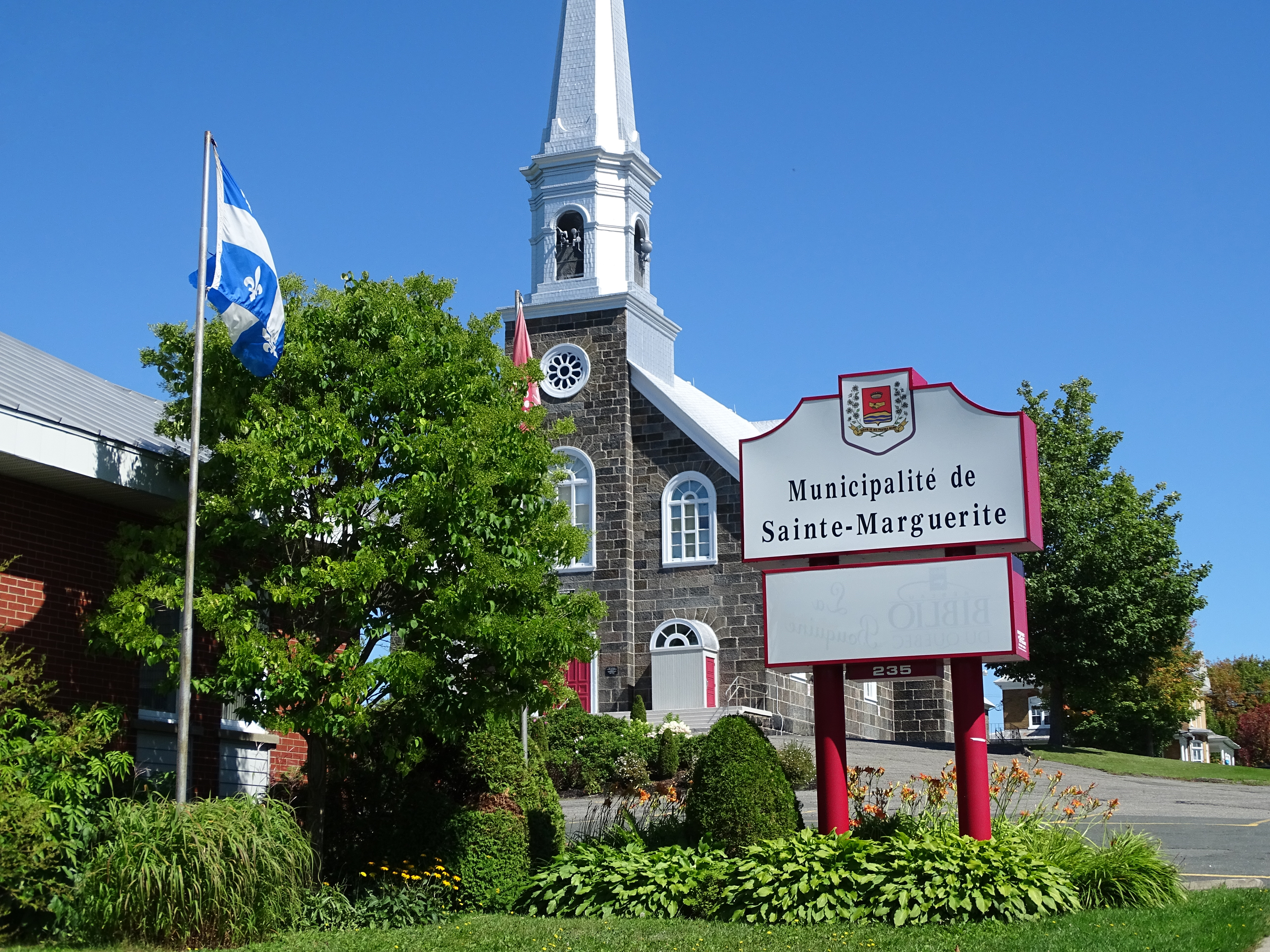
- Church and municipal building.

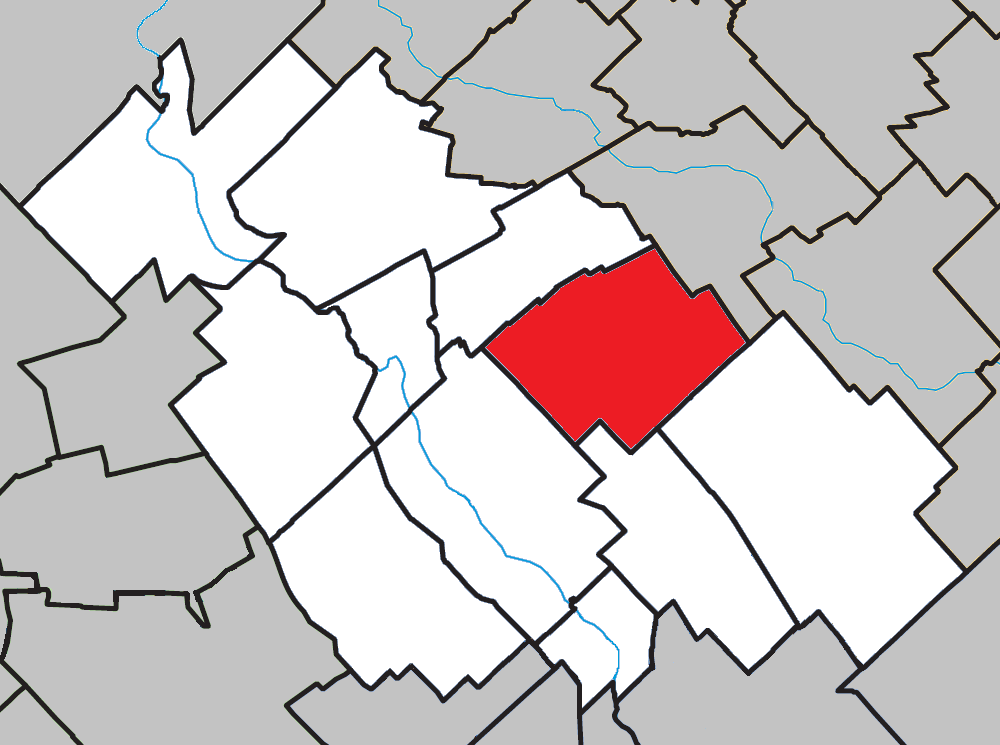
- Location within La Nouvelle-Beauce RCM.

- Location in southern Quebec.
- Coordinates: 46°31′N 70°56′W
- Country: Canada
- Province: Quebec
- Region: Chaudière-Appalaches
- RCM: La Nouvelle-Beauce
- Constituted: July 1, 1855

Government
  - Mayor: Claude Perreault
  - Federal riding: Beauce
  - Prov. riding: Beauce-Nord

Area
  - Total: 83.10 km^{2} (32.09 sq mi)
  - Land: 83.05 km^{2} (32.07 sq mi)

Population (2021)
  - Total: 1,175
  - Density: 14.1/km^{2} (37/sq mi)
  - Pop 2016-2021: ▲9.0%
  - Dwellings: 531
- Time zone: UTC−5 (EST)
  - Summer (DST): UTC−4 (EDT)
- Postal code(s): G0S 2X0
- Area codes: 418 and 581
- Highways: R-216; R-275
- Website: www.sainte-marguerite.ca

Sainte-Marguerite (French pronunciation: [sɛ̃t maʁɡərit]) is a parish municipality in La Nouvelle-Beauce Regional County Municipality in the Chaudière-Appalaches region of Quebec, Canada. Its population is 1,175 as of the Canada 2021 Census. It is named after Marguerite Marcoux, who gave part of the land she owned in 1830 for the construction of a church.

== Demographics ==
In the 2021 Census of Population conducted by Statistics Canada, Sainte-Marguerite had a population of 1,175 living in 491 of its 531 total private dwellings, a change of 9% from its 2016 population of 1,078. With a land area of 83.05 km^{2} (32.07 sq mi), it had a population density of 14.1/km^{2} (36.6/sq mi) in 2021.
