= 2023 in Norway =

- Centuries: 19th; 20th; 21st
- Decades: 2000s; 2010s; 2020s
- See also: List of years in Norway

Events in the year 2023 in Norway.

== Incumbents ==
- Monarch – Harald V
- President of the Storting – Masud Gharahkhani (Labour).
- Prime Minister – Jonas Gahr Støre (Labour).

== Events ==
- 23 February–3 March – Protests take place in Oslo against the government over a Supreme Court ruling in 2021 that found that windmills built in Fosen, Trøndelag, violated indigenous human rights. Both energy minister Terje Aasland and prime minister Jonas Gahr Støre later went on to apologise for the violations.
- 31 March – Five people are killed by avalanches in Northern Norway.
- 17–20 April – The Norwegian Confederation of Trade Unions and Confederation of Vocational Unions withdraws from settlement negotiations with the Confederation of Norwegian Enterprise and the state broker. The withdrawal was caused by the latter Unions' demands for a wage increase for all members and a settlement that exceeds the assumed price increase; which wasn't meant. This led to a strike in the midst of the negotiations. The Confederation of Trade Unions and the Confederation of Norwegian Enterprise reached an agreement on 20 April. Despite this, the Confederation of Vocational Unions initially stated that they would continue to strike, but later the same day seized it's strikes and accepted the agreed settlement.
- 7 August – The extreme weather Hans causes floods and landslides in parts of Southern Norway, Sweden, Finland and Lithuania.
- 9 August – Storm Hans: After several days of heavy rain in Norway, a dam breaks into the Glomma river in Braskereidfoss. Locals are evacuated.
- 10 August – After several days of heavy rains in Norway, the town of Hamar floods the speed skating rink at the Vikingskipet arena in order to relieve the flooding in other parts of the town.
- 4 September – Norway's two biggest cities, Oslo and Bergen, paid electricity customers to use power following a wet summer which filled the reservoirs used to provide hydroelectricity, causing wholesale prices to reach –€1.42 per megawatt hour.
- 11 September – 2023 Norwegian local elections
- 15 December – Anne Borg steps down as NTNU rector, having previously criticized two of its employees and later withdrawn her criticism.

=== Sports ===
- 29 November–17 December – Norway hosts the 2023 World Women's Handball Championship together with Sweden and Denmark.
- Thomas Kolåsæter won a gold medal at the International Quizzing Championships, in the pairs category together with Victoria Groce.

== Anniversaries ==
- 14 June – 100 years since the birth of painter Jakob Weidemann.

== Deaths ==
=== January ===
- 6 January – Mona Lyngar, writer (born 1944).
- 9 January – Magnar Mangersnes, organist and conductor (born 1938).
- 11 January – Haakon Pedersen, singer (born 1959).
- 13 January –
  - Odd Bergh, athlete (born 1937).
  - Laila Mikkelsen, film director and producer (born 1940).
- 16 January – Bjarne Hansen, footballer (born 1929).
- 24 January – Ole Didrik Lærum, oncologist and rector (born 1940).
- 28 January – Odd Børre, singer (born 1939).
- 28 January – Anne Haug, politician (born 1921).
- 31 January – Jorunn Hageler, politician (born 1946).

=== February ===
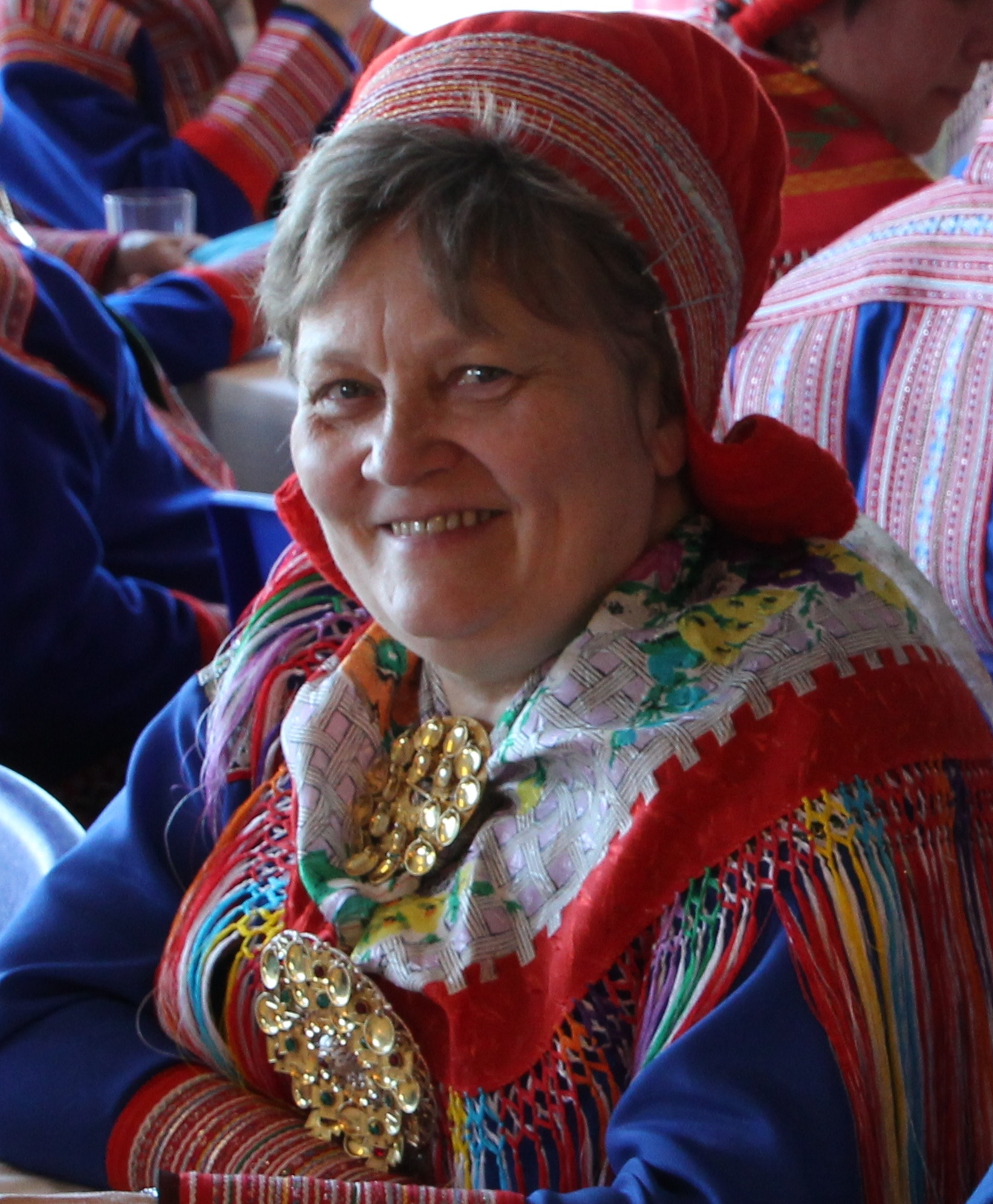
Ellen Inga O. Hætta

- 7 February – Rie Bistrup, journalist (born 19361).
- 11 February – Odd Eriksen, politician (born 1955).
- 12 February – Arne Treholt, politician and convicted spy.
- 12 February – Annie Blakstad, politician (born 1935).
- 16 February – Marie Borge Refsum, politician (born 1927).
- 17 February – Arne Tumyr, journalist (born 1933).
- 22 February – Ellen Inga O. Hætta, politician (born 1953).
- 24 February – Edith Roger, dancer, choreographer and stage director (born 1922).

=== March ===
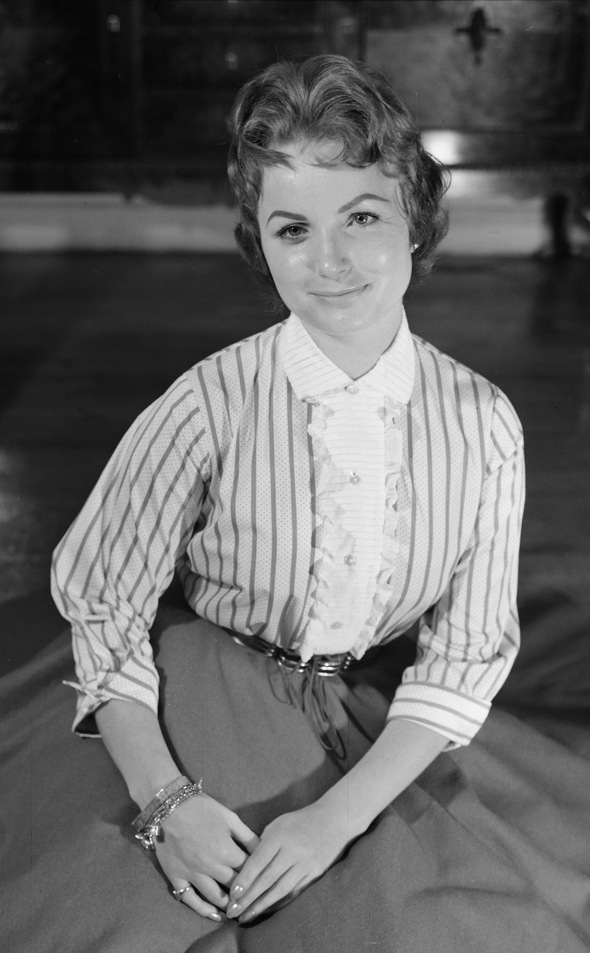
Anita Thallaug

- 2 March – Per Kristoffersen, footballer (born 1937).
- 8 March – Sverre Olaf Lie, pediatrician (born 1938).
- 9 March – Tanja Heiberg Storm, diplomat (born 1946).
- 15 March – Odd Hoftun, engineer and missionary (born 1927).
- 18 March – Sverre Valen, conductor (born 1925).
- 20 March – Anita Thallaug, singer and actress (born 1938).
- 22 March – Tony Knapp, footballer (born 1936).
- 22 March – Rigmor Kofoed-Larsen, politician (born 1944).

=== April ===
- 8 April – Peder Borgen, theologist (born 1928).
- 14 April – Egil Abrahamsen, ships engineer (born 1923).
- 17 April – Bente Træen, sexologist (born 1958).
- 20 April – Ivar Kristianslund, preacher (born 1934).
- 26 April – Frode Fonnum, neuroscientist (born 1937).

=== May ===
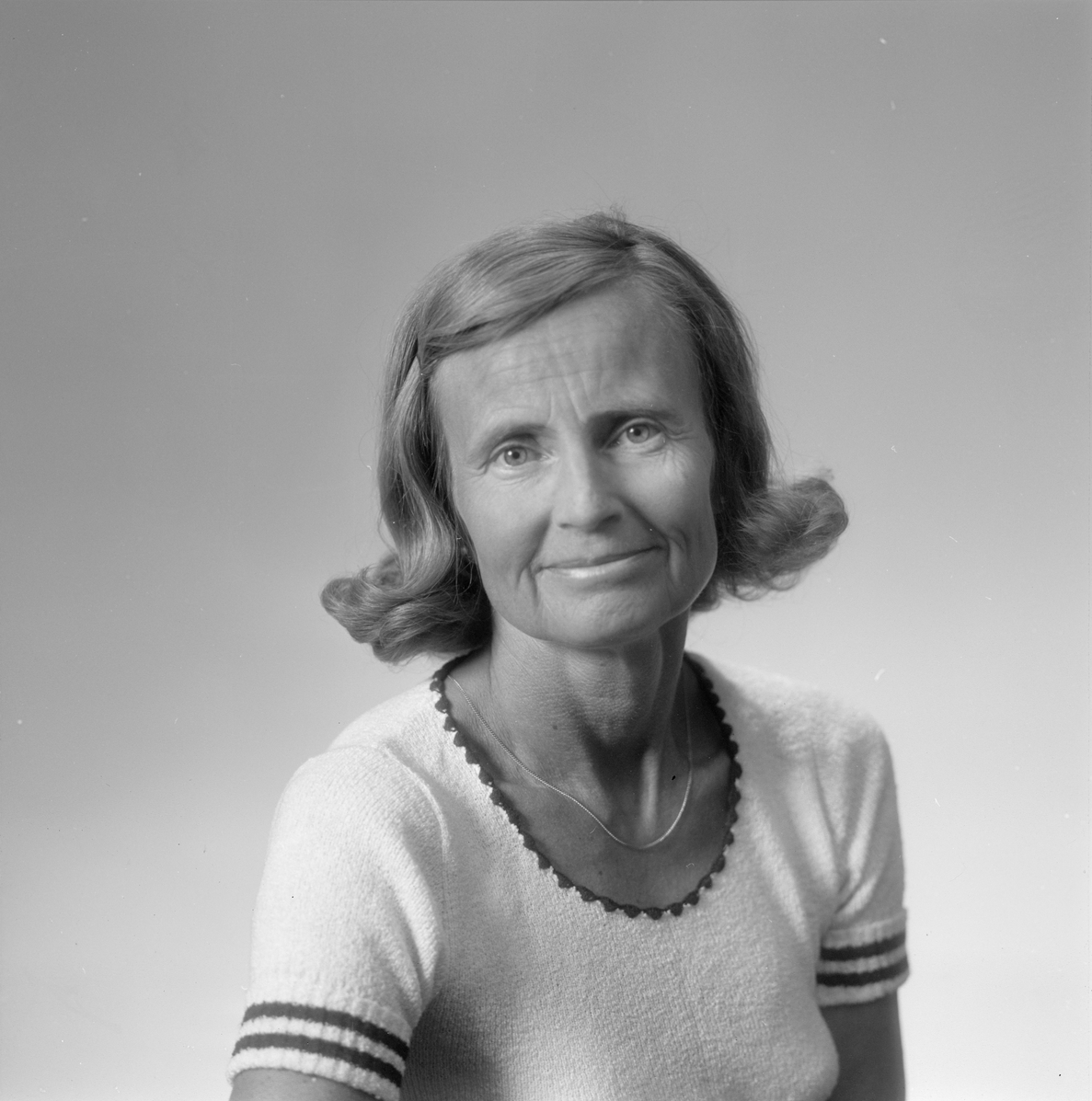
Aase Foss Abrahamsen

- 7 May – Aase Foss Abrahamsen, writer (born 1930).
- 9 May – Terje Rafdal, wheelchair curler (born 1965).
- 10 May – Arne Strand, journalist and newspaper editor (born 1944).
- 11 May – Karl Sverre Klevstad, politician (born 1926).
- 17 May – Erna Hagensen, trade unionist (born 1957).
- 20 May – Sven Nyhus, musician, composer and musicologist (born 1932).
- 22 May – Inger Nafstad, veterinarian (born 1934).
- 24 May – Rolf Skår, computer engineer and entrepreneur (born 1941).
- 28 May – Kjell Aartun, theologian and linguist (born 1925).

=== June ===
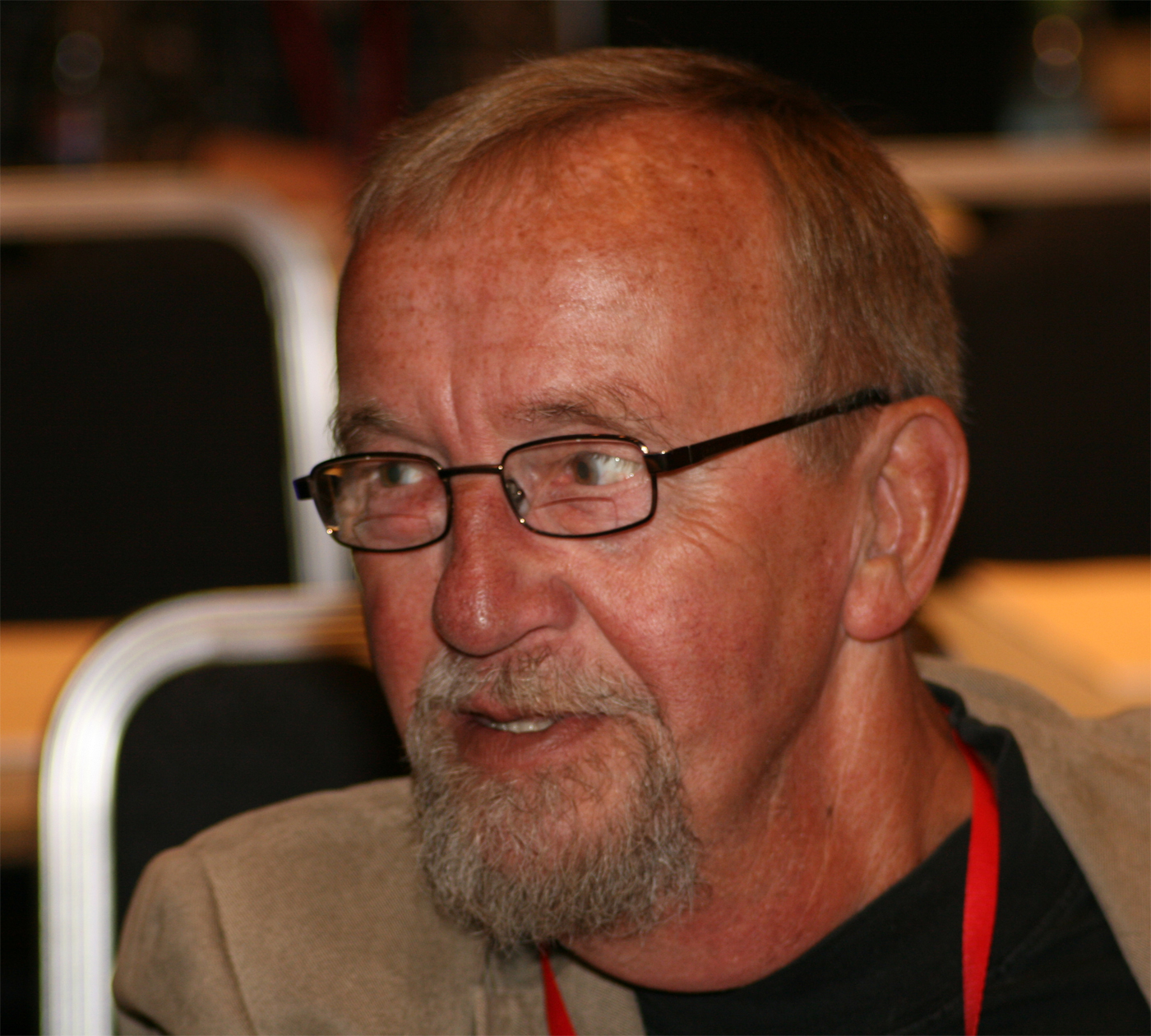
Yngve Hågensen

- 3 June – Totto Osvold, radio presenter (born 1941).
- 4 June – Olav Øverland, news anchor (born 1931).
- 5 June – Aud Blattmann, politician (born 1937).
- 7 June – Aud-Inger Aure, politician (born 1942).
- 13 June – Rolf Seljelid, physician (born 1934).
- 14 June – Kjell Rasmussen, diplomat (born 1927).
- 17 June – Yngve Hågensen, trade unionist (born 1938).
- 22 June – Liv Hatle, cardiologist (born 1936, died in Spain).
- 29 June – Bea Ballintijn, swimmer (born 1923).
- 30 June – Ruth Anker Høyer, judge (born 1945).

=== July ===
- 6 July – Asbjørn Bjørnset, politician (born 1938).
- 10 July – Esther Kostøl, trade unionist (born 1936).
- 14 July – Georg Hille, clergyman (born 1923).
- 22 July – Knut Riisnæs, jazz musician (born 1945).
- 23 July – Rolf Rustad, handball player and television editor (born 1935).
- 27 July – Rune Richardsen, footballer (born 1962).
- 29 July – Sigrid Blömeke, educationalist (born 1965).
- 30 July – Kristian B. Dysthe, mathematician (born 1937).

=== August ===
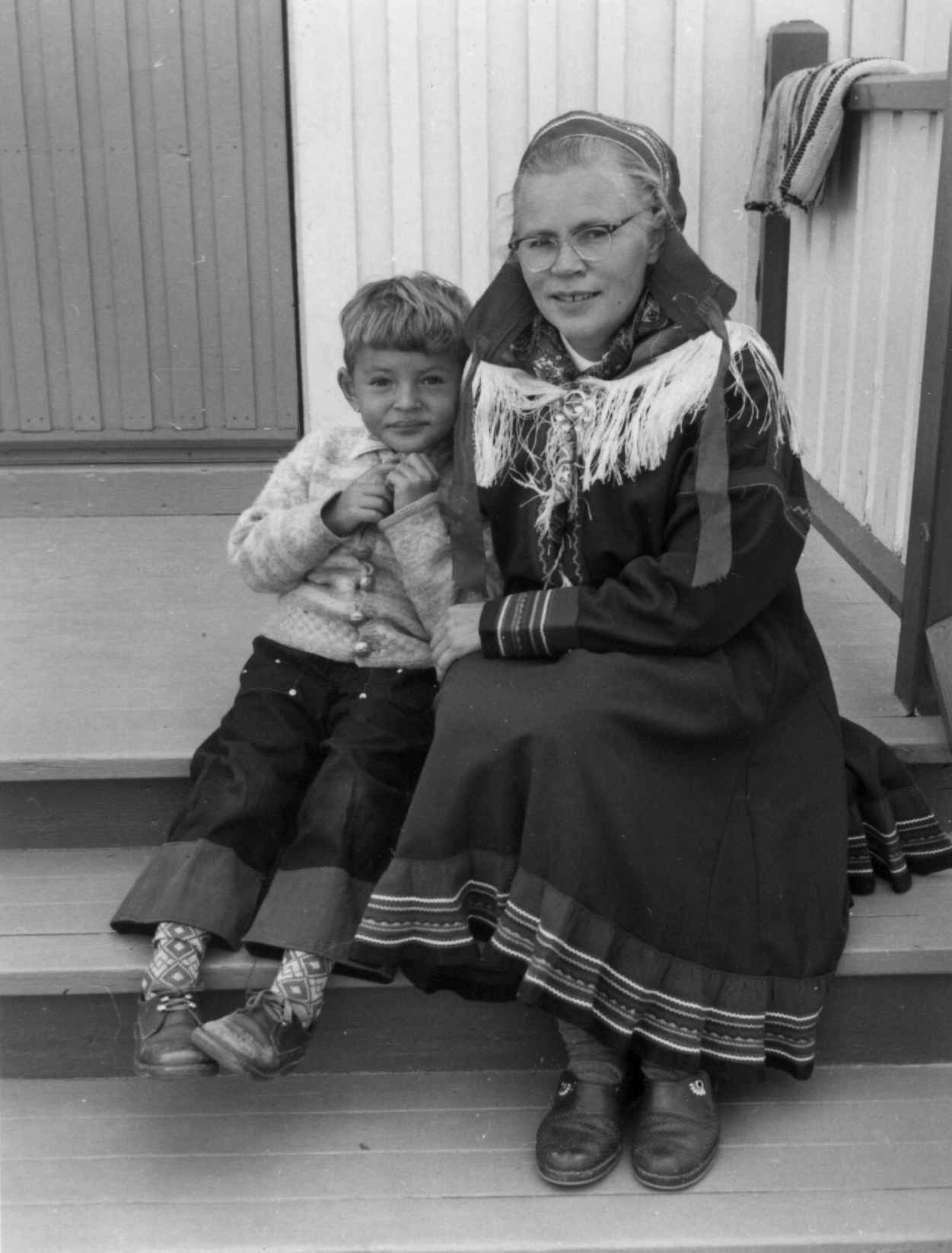
Edel Hætta Eriksen

- 1 August – Inger Pedersen, politician (born 1936).
- 5 August – Ivar Østberg, politician (born 1942).
- 13 August – Edel Hætta Eriksen, educator and politician (born 1921).
- 16 August – Ernst Wroldsen, politician (born 1954).
- 18 August – Kristin Moe, politician and civil servant (born 1954).
- 28 August – Sigve Tjøtta, mathematician (born 1930).

=== September ===
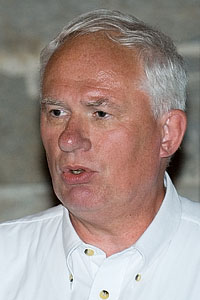
Geir Lundestad

- 1 September – Olav Eikeland, philosopher (born 1955).
- 2 September – Arnfinn Larsen, competition rower (born 1930).
- 10 September – Hjalmar Torp, archaeologist (born 1924).
- 14 September – Herman Høst, physician (born 1926).
- 14 September – Ola Listhaug, political scientist (born 1949).
- 18 September – Johanne Huitfeldt, art historian (born 1932).
- 19 September
  - Egil Johansen, footballer (born 1962).
  - Johannes Moe, engineer and research administrator (born 1926).
- 21 September – Ruth Ryste, politician (born 1932).
- 22 September – Geir Lundestad, historian and director of the Norwegian Nobel Institute (born 1945).
- 22 September – Grethe W. Bjørlo, politician (born 1932).
- 28 September
  - Stephen Ackles, musician (born 1966).
  - Sissel Lange-Nielsen, writer (born 1931).
- 29 September – Jan L. Stub, politician (born 1943).

=== October ===
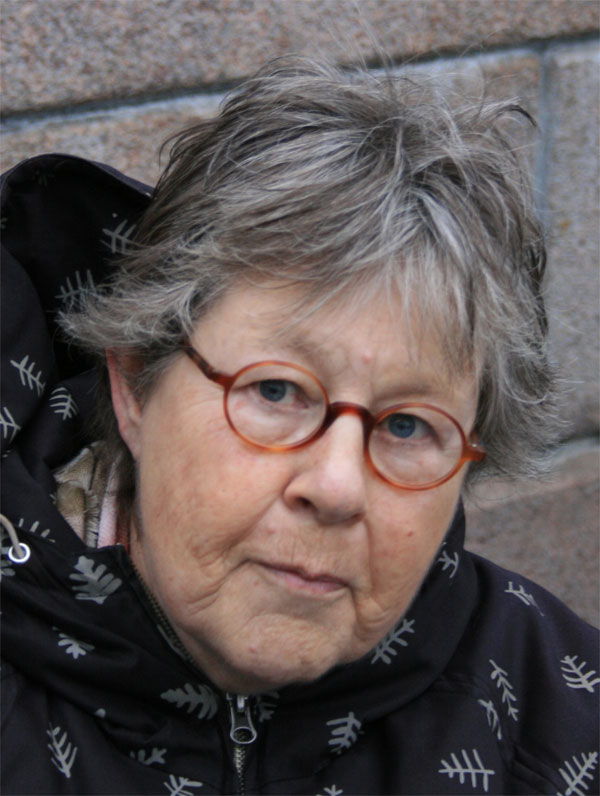
Wenche Blomberg

- 4 October – Harald Tusberg, television personality (born 1935).
- 5 October – Thor Nilsen, competition rower (born 1931).
- 9 October – Ottar Befring, officer and politician (born 1939).
- 12 October
  - Per Egil Hegge, journalist and editor (born 1940).
  - Jon Hustad, journalist (born 1968).
- 13 October – Arne Haaland, chemist (born 1936).
- 15 October – Torstein Seiersten, speed skater (born 1931).
- 19 October – Carl Morten Iversen, musician (born 1948).
- 27 October – Wenche Blomberg, writer (born 1943).
- 29 October – Siri Frost Sterri, politician (born 1944).

=== November ===
- 1 November – Jan Kristiansen, speed skater (born 1934).
- 5 November – Ole N. Hoemsnes, journalist (born 1927).
- 5 November – Olaf Eliassen, politician (born 1949).
- 15 November – Aage Hansen, motorcycle speedway rider (born 1935).
- 15 November – Hans Herbjørnsrud, writer (born 1938).
- 18 November – Olav Sønderland, police officer (born 1942).
- 19 November – Marvin Arnesen, footballer (born 1963).
- 19 November – Arnfinn Ellingsen, politician (born 1946).
- 22 November – Per Risvik, politician (born 1937).
- 23 November – Bernt Eggen, author and editor (born 1944).
- 25 November – Yngvar Numme, singer and performer (born 1944).

=== December ===
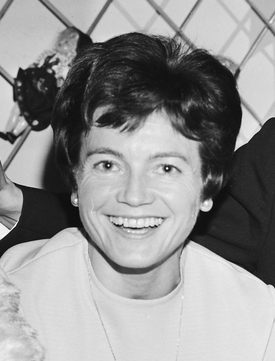
Ingrid Wigernæs

- 2 December – Ingrid Wigernæs, cross-country skier (born 1928).
- 4 December
  - Grete Knudsen, politician (born 1940).
  - Kjell Eliassen, diplomat (born 1929).
- 6 December
  - Tore Aleksandersen, volleyball coach (born 1968).
  - Arve Johnsen, industrial executive (born 1934).
- 12 December – Ole Paus, singer and songwriter (born 1947).
- 12 December – Jakob Margido Esp, drag artist (born 1943, died in Spain).
- 12 December – Magne Malmanger, art historian (born 1932).
- 13 December – Per Thomas Andersen, literary historian (born 1954).
- 15 December – Berit Bettum, politician (born 1939).
- 24 December – Bjørn Skogstad Aamo, economist and politician (born 1946).
- 26 December – Elsa Lystad, actress (born 1930).
- 26 December – Torstein Bieler, musician (born 1959).
