= Hegg =

Hegg is a surname. Notable people with the surname include:

- Eric A. Hegg (1867–1948), Swedish-American photographer
- Eric L. Hegg, American biochemist
- Jan Wessel Hegg (born 1938), Norwegian diplomat
- Jon-Hermann Hegg (born 1999), Norwegian sport shooter
- Steve Hegg (born 1963), American cyclist
- Tom Hegg, American writer
- Warren Hegg (born 1968), English cricketer

== See also ==
- Hegg, Wisconsin, unincorporated community
- Heggs, a surname
