= Greece–Norway relations =

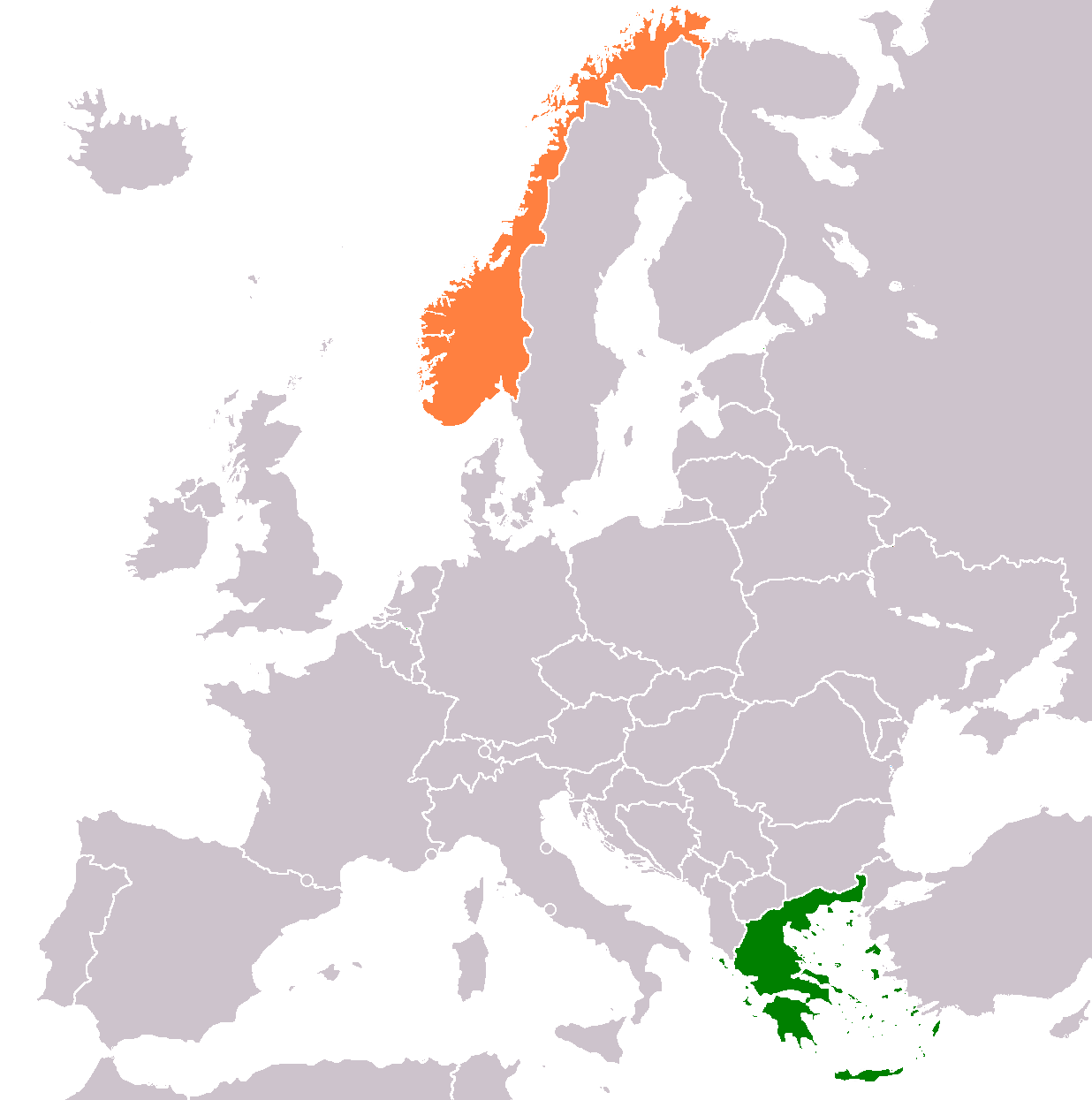
- Greece: Norway

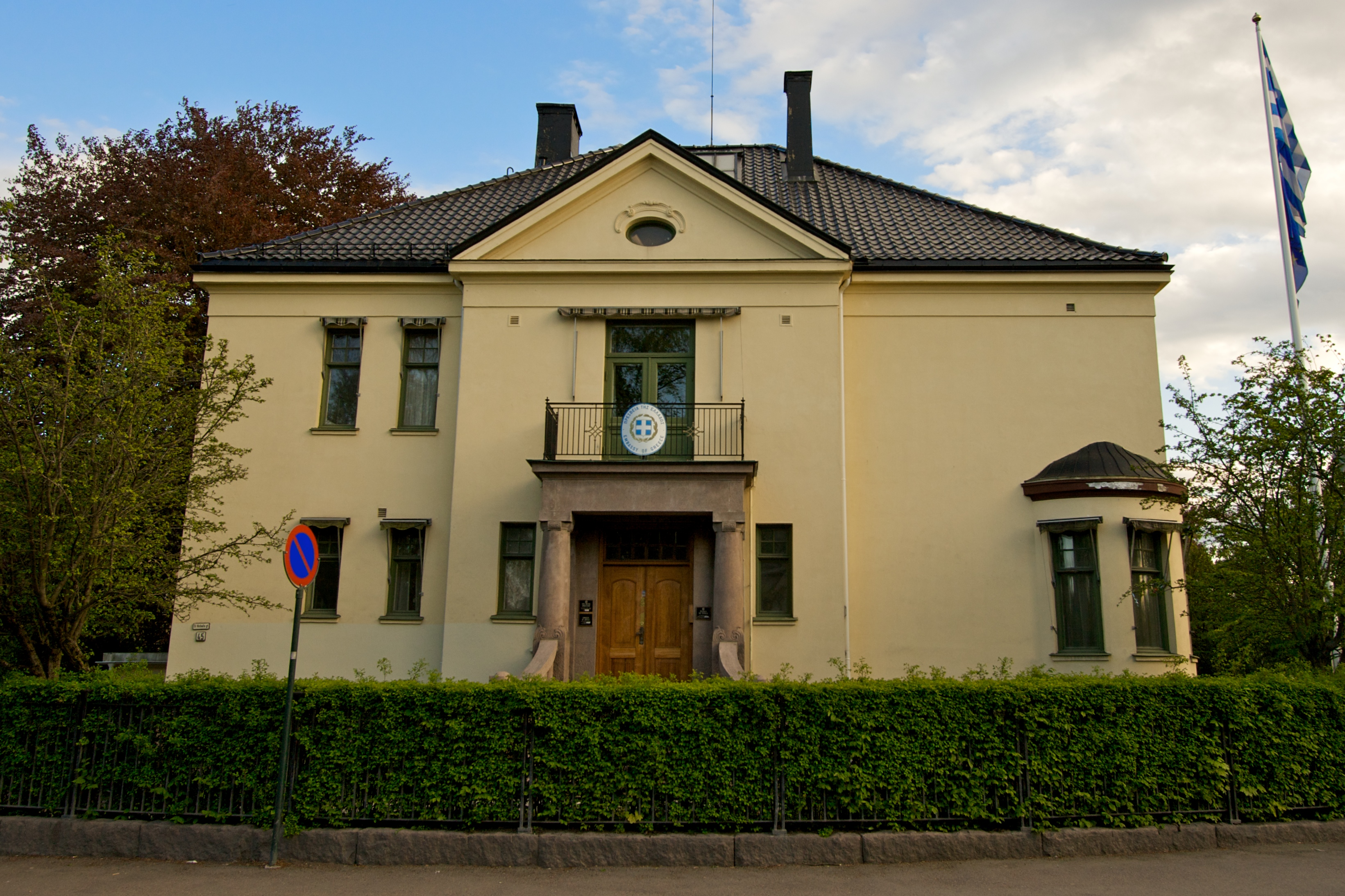
Embassy of Greece in Norway

Greece–Norway relations are foreign relations between Greece and Norway. The Greek Embassy in Oslo opened in 1980 and the Norwegian Embassy in Athens opened in 1974.

Greece's embassy in Oslo (since 1980) and an honorary consulate in Bergen represents Greece diplomatically in Norway. Norway has an embassy in Athens, and eight honorary consulates in Corfu, Crete (Chania and Iraklion), Kos, Patras, Piraeus, Rhodes and Thessaloniki. Both countries are members of NATO.

== History ==
In 1925, Greece signed the Svalbard Treaty, which recognizes the sovereignty of Norway over the archipelago of Svalbard in the Arctic Ocean, and grants signatories equal rights to engage in commercial activities and scientific research on the archipelago.

In 1967, Norway and three other countries brought the Greek Case against the Greek junta regime for human rights violations.

== Agreements ==
The two countries have signed the Treaty on Social Security (1980), a Treaty on Cultural Agreement (1976), and an Agreement on the Avoidance of Double Taxation (1988).

== Tourism ==
Greece, which ranks very high on the list of Norwegian tourist preferences, is amongst the top contenders, welcoming about 22% of the tourist population, which is estimated at some 250,000 people throughout the year. The tourist traffic flows from Norway to Greece in recent years have been increasing and Greece is a favorite destination for Norwegians. According to the Greek Statistical Service the number of Norwegians who visited Greece in 2002 came to 181,383 and in 2003 to 230,232. The island of Antiparos has often been described as the Norwegian island because here is more Norwegian tourists than any other tourists without Greeks.

== Economic relations ==
Through the European Economic Area Agreement (EEA), Norway is a part of EU's Internal Market, and in addition has incorporated EU legislation to ensure that the "Four Freedoms" governing the EU/EEA Internal Market (i.e. free movement of goods, persons, capital, services), are being observed.

As part of the EEA Agreement, Norway with the two other EFTA States have established the EEA Financial Mechanisms in order to contribute to the reduction of economic and social disparities within the European Economic Area

Since 2001, Greek exports to Norway have increased in pharmaceuticals, cotton, clothing, non-ferrous metals, plastics, steel products, and fresh fruit and in 2003 amounted to some NOK 430 million (€52, 800, 000 approximately). Norway exports fishery products, maritime equipment, aluminium alloys, and granite, which in 2003 amounted to about NOK 970 million. Norwegian exports to Greece amount to approximately NOK 1,2 billion per year. Norway enjoys a large surplus of trade as the imports from Greece remain at just over NOK 400 million per year. Although trade between Greece and Norway has shown a slight decrease in the last three years, efforts are being made to boost trade and investment. The processes and projects associated with the implementation and strengthening of the EEA Mechanisms should bring more interaction between Greece and Norway, especially when it comes to the business sector.

The sectors that are of particular interest to Norwegian exporters are Seafood, Environmental Technology and Alternative Energy as well as Shipping and Ship-Building. There has been a long shipping tradition between Greece and Norway and ships are sold and bought between the two countries frequently. Norwegian companies sell catamarans and other vessels as well as technological equipment to their Greek counterparts. Norwegian maritime exporters participate at POSEIDONIA Exhibition held in Greece and further development of relations with the Greek shipping industry in order to increase Norwegian shipping exports is desirable.

The value of direct Norwegian investments in Greece came to NOK 1,006 million at the end of 2002 – an important increase compared with previous years (2001: 605, 2000: 864, 1998: NOK 352 million). In general, Norway promotes its expertise and strength in Building and Construction, Consumer Goods, ICT, Maritime Industry, Oil and gas, Process Industry, Environmental Technology, Seafood, and Services.

== Ambassadors ==
The Norwegian ambassadors to Greece:

- Kåre Dæhlen (1974–1975)
- Inge Reidarssøn Rindal (1975–1981)
- Kjell Rasmussen (1981–1985)
- Tancred Ibsen, Jr. (1986–1989)
- Nils Oscar Dietz (1990–1994)
- Bjørn Barth (1994–1996)
- Rolf Trolle Andersen (1996–1998)
- Jan Wessel Hegg (1998–2001)
- Finn Kristen Fostervoll (2001–2006)
- Sverre Stub (2006–2011)
- Sjur Larsen (2011–2015)
- Jørn E. Gjelstad (2015–2019)
- Frode Overland Andersen (2019–)

== Immigration ==
The Greek community in Norway consists of 1,671 individuals in 2009, up from 1,572 in 2008. The majority are established in Oslo and Bergen more or less permanently. An overwhelming majority have created family ties, by marrying Norwegian nationals. Hordaland has the highest number of Greek pupils in the country, 8 of 11.

== Culture ==
The Norwegian Institute at Athens opened in 1989, and is one of 17 foreign archaeological institutes in Athens.

=== The Greek Orthodox Church in Norway ===
The congregation was founded in 1965 with main purpose to serve the Greek-speaking Greek Orthodox in Norway. Church fall under Metropolita Pavlos Menevissoglou of Sweden and Scandinavia, based in Stockholm. Parish priest Archimandrite Evmenios Likakis and others. There is one Greek Orthodox church in Norway (in Oslo). There is also a small congregation in Bergen with 98 members, St. Michael's Orthodox Church.

== Resident diplomatic missions ==
- Greece has an embassy in Oslo.
- Norway has an embassy in Athens.

== See also ==
- Foreign relations of Greece
- Foreign relations of Norway
