= Anne Borg =

Anne Borg may refer to:

- Anne Borg (dancer) (1936–2016), Norwegian ballet dancer
- Anne Borg (physicist) (born 1958), Norwegian physicist

== See also ==
- Veda Ann Borg, American actress
