= Eric Hegg =

Eric Hegg may refer to:

- Eric A. Hegg (1867–1947), Swedish-American photographer
- Eric L. Hegg, American biochemist
