= Nafstad =

Nafstad is a Norwegian surname. Notable people with the surname include:

- Inger Nafstad (1934–2023), Norwegian veterinarian and toxicologist
- Ole Nafstad (born 1946), Norwegian rower

== See also ==
- Anne Nafstad Lyftingsmo
