= Heggs =

Heggs is a surname. Notable people with the surname include:

- Alvin Heggs (born 1967), American basketball player
- Carl Heggs (born 1970), English footballer and manager
- Rosalind Heggs (born 1952), English cricketer

== See also ==
- Hegg
