= Larss and Duclos =

Canadian photographic studio

Larss and Duclos was a photographic studio partnership between Per Edvard Larss and Joseph E. N. Duclos (1863-1917) in Dawson City, Yukon Territory during the Klondike Gold Rush era of the late 19th and early 20th centuries.

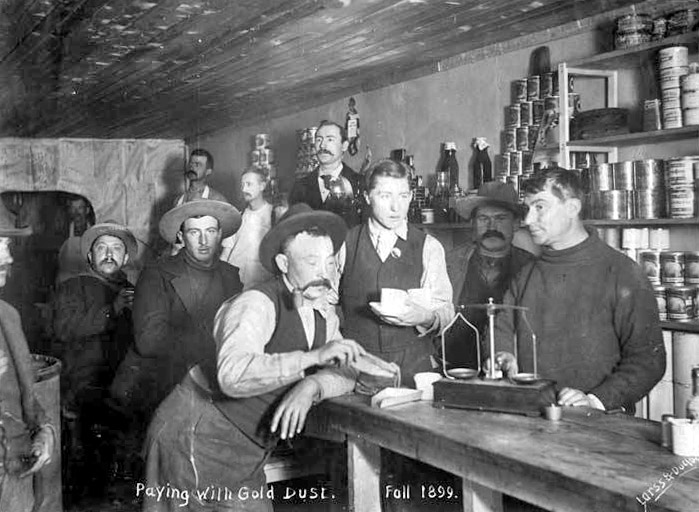
Paying with gold dust in a Dawson City grocery store, 1899

Duclos was born in Quebec and moved to Maine where he learned photography. He moved to Dawson with his wife Emily in 1898 via St. Michael, Alaska and the Yukon River. He mined on Lovett Gulch until he joined the studio. Duclos specialized in portraits while Larss photographed gold rush scenes and scenery.

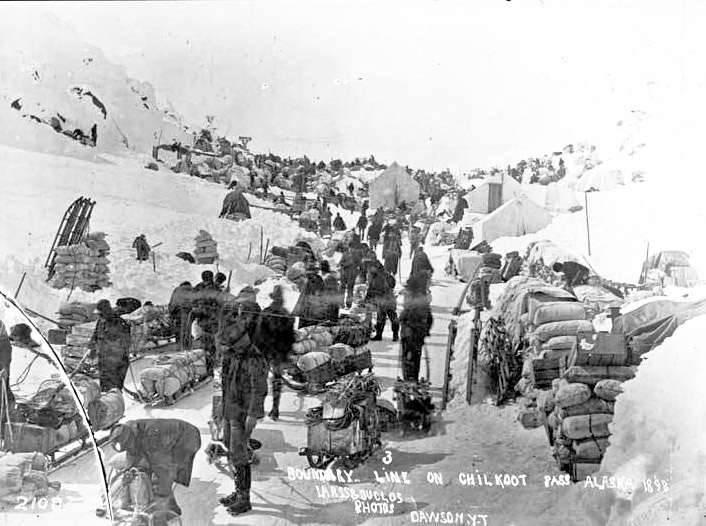
The border pass on the Chilkoot Trail, 1898

Larss and Duclos took over the studio of Eric A. Hegg, who arrived in Skagway in October 1897 after a short stop in Dyea. He immediately opened a studio and was joined a year later by his brother and a friend of the two brothers, Peter Andersson, along with Per Edvard Larss in the following spring, who also was a Swedish-American photographer. In 1899, after a year in Yukon, Hegg returned to Skagway and left his studio in Dawson to Larss and Duclos. Duclos was from Quebec.

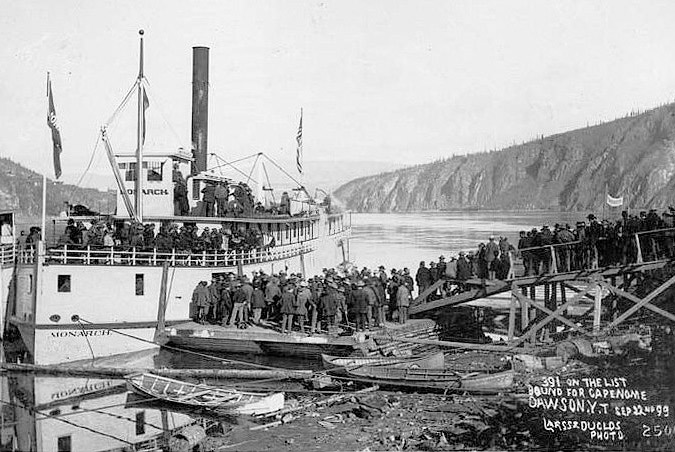
People boarding a steamboat in Dawson, Yukon Territory heading for Cape Nome, September 1899

The pair witnessed the Chilkoot Trail and the Klondike gold rush capturing iconic photographs that are used to illustrate the era.

The partnership dissolved in 1904 when Larss left the area for Denver and Nevada, selling out to his partner. Duclos continued in the studio business until 1914.

== Collections ==
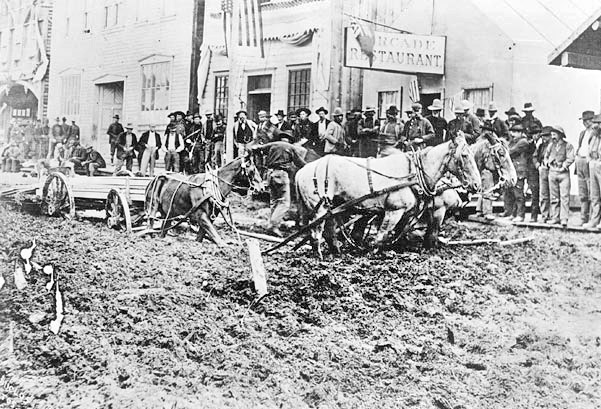
Horses pulling a wagon through a muddy Front Street in Dawson City, 1898

The pair's work is collected by various museums and archives in Canada, Alaska, and Washington State, many of them making their photographs available online.

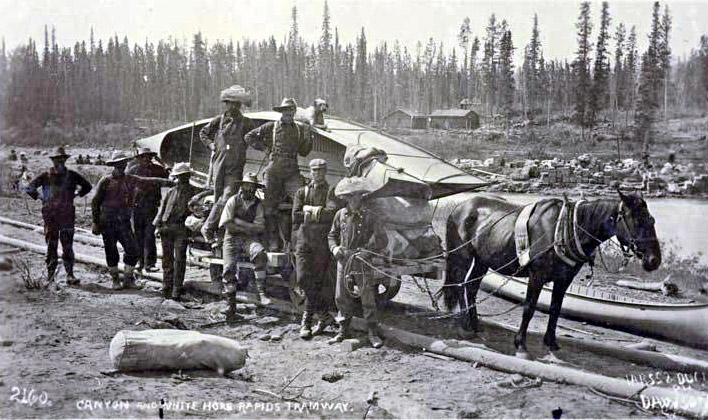
Canyon and Whitehorse Rapids Tramway, 1898

These include the Royal Museum of British Columbia. University of Washington Libraries, City of Vancouver Archives, Vancouver Public Library special collections, the Yukon Archives, Alaska State Archives, Dawson City Museum, McCord and others.

== See also ==
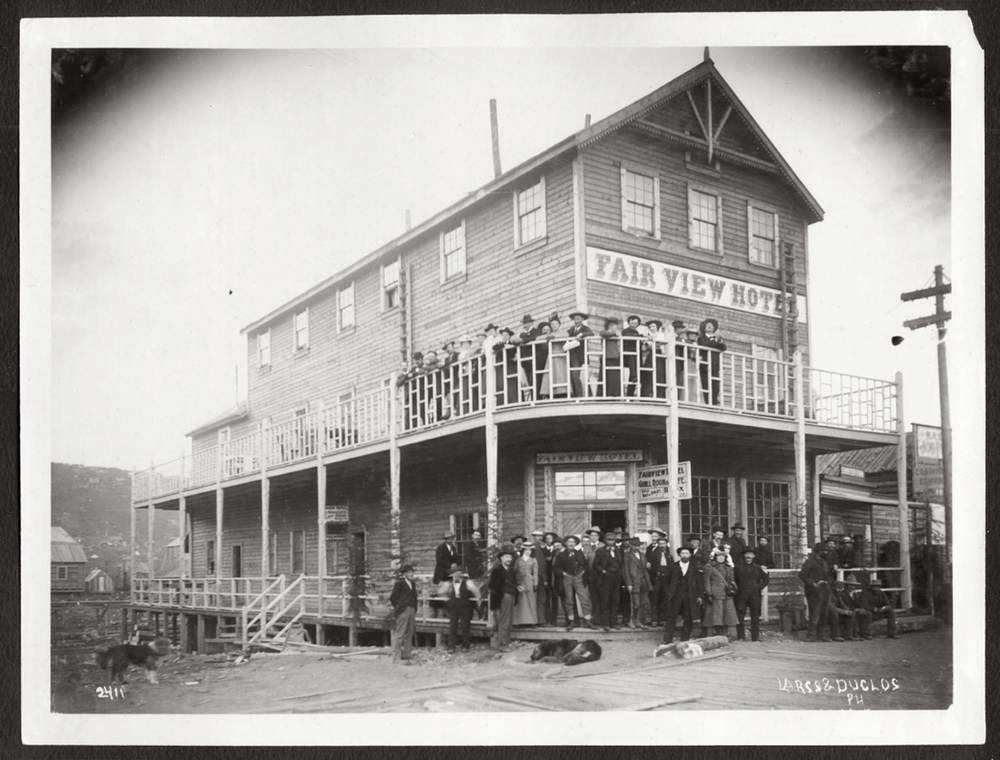
Fair View Hotel in Dawson, ca. 1899

- Arctic Club
- The Gold Rush, a Charlie Chaplin film satirizing the gold rush era
