= Anne Haug (politician) =

Norwegian politician (1921–2023)

Anne Haug (10 October 1921 – 28 January 2023) was a Norwegian politician for the Conservative Party.

She was born in Sigdal Municipality. Her upbringing on a farm with six siblings made her seek a life outside of farming, and she took education as a nurse. She married the chief physician Leiv Haug, settling in Namsos Municipality in 1960.

Anne Haug became involved in local politics and was elected to the municipal council for Namsos Municipality in 1967. In 1975 she was elected as the first woman to serve in Nord-Trøndelag county council. Haug also served as a deputy representative to the Parliament of Norway from Nord-Trøndelag during the term 1973–1977 and 1977–1981. In total she met during 4 days of parliamentary session.

Her political tenure was especially marked by endeavours in health policy, securing an agreement to uphold Namsos Hospital in addition to the larger hospital in the more populous southern part of Nord-Trøndelag. She was also instrumental in the establishment of Namsos senior center and Namdal inter-municipal nursing home. She was noted as a social conservative, telling journalists to "not speak of gender equality with me", espousing that females should be strengthened on an individual level. She was also skeptical towards a growing welfare state in the 1970s.

She was a board member of the Norwegian State Educational Loan Fund from 1982 to 1987. Haug died in January 2023, aged 102.
