= Johanne Huitfeldt =

Norwegian art historian and curator (1932–2023)

Johanne Huitfeldt (29 January 1932 – 18 September 2023) was a Norwegian art historian and curator.

== Career ==
She hailed from Spjeldnes in Lindås Municipality. Shortly after taking her examen artium, she was employed at Norwegian Museum of Decorative Arts and Design, and stayed here as a curator for four decades. During her tenure, the museum got a permanent exhibition of East Asian crafts in 1983. After previously doing undergraduate studies in archaeology and art history at the University of Oslo, she took the cand.philol. degree at the Stockholm University. Her master's thesis was about the Munthe collection of East Asian design objects. For her long tenure at the Museum of Decorative Arts and Design, in 2002 she was awarded the King's Medal of Merit in silver.

Huitfeldt edited a popular book series on antiquities, published by C. Huitfeldt since 1973. She also released several books of her own, mainly presenting exhibitions on her museum in the coffee table book format.

In 1999 she created an endowment of 1 million kr in order to establish Chinese art history as a teaching subject at the University of Oslo. Lectures would be held in the autumn semester by herself and guest lecturers, including Roderick Whitfield.

=== Reception ===
Huitfeldt's 1990 book General Munthe: Eventyrer og kunstsamler i det gamle Kina covered the subject for her master's thesis. The book reviewer in Bergens Tidende was "grateful" for the "festive introduction to the Munthe collection" and the "congenial" description of Johan Munthe. The book was also tidy, logical and "extraordinarily useful" for people who visited the exhibition of this collection. Most of the objects were stowed away in storage, however.

In 1993 she followed up with Ostindisk porselen i Norge, documenting how "Ostindian" porcelain was imported to Denmark and Norway, mainly in the 18th century. In reviewing the book, Hamar Arbeiderblad gave Ostindisk porselen i Norge a dice throw of 5, declaring that the book offered "an unusually exciting voyage through beautiful things to a time long gone". As such, the book would find appeal outside of the inner circle of art specialists. Wrote Tønsbergs Blad, "It is truly a book to 'get cozy' with, and is hereby given our warmest recommendations". Moss Avis hoped for more books by Huitfeldt in the future to develop "our sparse literature on industrial art.

The 1997 book Blått som havet documented Chinese porcelain, painted in cobalt blue, that inspired Norwegian porcelain manufacturers such as Porsgrund. In Norway, a rich supply of cobalt was found in Modum. The book of the same name contained "interesting perspectives", wrote Aftenposten. Huitfeldt pointed out that the figures and symbols in Chinese porcelain had religious and philosophical meanings that were lost in translation. In a short review, Bergens Tidende called it a "both useful and beautiful work".

2002's Drømmen om Kina received a dice throw of 5 in Dagsavisen. The book, and the exhibition of the same name, were about Chinese-inspired design around Norway, among others painted ceilings, tapestries and gazebos, mainly stemming from the 17th and 18th centuries.

Her last book Bergtatt av kinesisk kunst came out in 2021, and her last exhibition was held at Linderud Manor in the summer of 2023. She died one month later, aged 91.

== Bibliography ==
- 2021: Bergtatt av kinesisk kunst. C. Huitfeldt.
- 2002: Drømmen om Kina. Kinesererier fra europeiske slott til norsk folkekunst. Andresen & Butenschøn.
- 2000: Porselenet fra Kina. Cesam Media.
- 1997: Blått som havet. Keramisk blåmaleri fra Peking til Porsgrund. C. Huitfeldt.
- 1993: Ostindisk porselen i Norge. C. Huitfeldt.
- 1990: General Munthe: Eventyrer og kunstsamler i det gamle Kina. C. Huitfeldt.
- 1984: Tekanner. C. Huitfeldt.
