= Kristian B. Dysthe =

Norwegian mathematician (1937–2023)

Kristian Barstad Dysthe (16 September 1937 – 30 July 2023) was a Norwegian mathematician.

== Biography ==
Dysthe took the cand.real. degree at the University of Bergen in 1962, and the dr.philos. degree in 1972. He became professor in applied mathematics at the University of Tromsø in 1972, and at the University of Bergen from 1992 to retirement in 2007. He has been a visiting scholar at the University of Cambridge, the Scripps Institution of Oceanography and the Stanford University. He was a member of the Norwegian Academy of Science and Letters. Dysthe died on 30 July 2023, at the age of 85.
