= Ruth Anker Høyer =

Judge and women's rights leader (1945–2023)

- Born: 19 January 1945
- Died: 30 June 2023 (aged 78)
- Occupation: Judge

Ruth Anker Høyer (19 January 1945 – 30 June 2023) was a Danish-born Norwegian judge and women's rights leader. She was a president of the Norwegian Association of Female Lawyers and was President of the Oslo Bar Association and a member of the presidium of the Norwegian Bar Association.

== Career ==
She studied law at the University of Copenhagen and graduated in 1970. She moved to Norway following her marriage to the Norwegian judge Jon Bonnevie Høyer, a grandson of the women's rights leader Margarete Bonnevie.

She worked in the National Insurance Administration, the Council for Gender Equality and the Consumer Council, and later practised as a lawyer in Oslo, from 1985 with her own law firm and specializing in family law. In 1994 she was appointed by the King-in-Council as a judge on the Oslo District Court, Norway's largest court, where she became head of one of the departments. She was one of the most high-profile female judges in Norway since the 1990s. After her retirement, she worked as an extraordinary judge on the Borgarting Court of Appeal.

She was President of the Norwegian Association of Female Lawyers, President of the Oslo Bar Association, a member of the presidium of the Norwegian Bar Association and a member of the national board of the Norwegian Association for Women's Rights. She also served as a member of several government-appointed committees, including the Royal Commission on Competition in the Legal Profession (2001–2002), appointed by the first Stoltenberg government.

She last resided at Fornebu. She died in June 2023.

== Bibliography ==
- Ruth Høyer (1976): Ekteskap og forsørgelse. Likestillingsrådet.
