= Olaf Eliassen =

Norwegian politician (1949–2023)

Member of the Sámi Parliament of Norway
- In office 2001–2013

Personal details
- Born: 3 September 1949 Porsáŋggu Municipality, Norway
- Died: 5 November 2023 (aged 74)
- Party: Sp; Árja
- Occupation: Farmer

Olaf Eliassen (3 September 1949 – 5 November 2023) was a Norwegian politician. A member of the Centre Party and later Árja, he served in the Sámi Parliament of Norway from 2001 to 2013.

Eliassen died on 5 November 2023, at the age of 74.
