= Jorunn Hageler =

Norwegian politician (1946–2023)

Jorunn Synnøve Hageler, née Innvik, (8 October 1946 – 31 January 2023) was a Norwegian politician for the Socialist Left Party.

Hageler was born in Sortland as a daughter of industry worker Kåre Innvik and cleaner Signe Nikolaisen. She attended school in Glomfjord from 1953 to 1962, when she went to Eidsvoll to study at upper secondary school, where she graduated in 1965. Hageler studied at Hamar Teacher College from 1966 to 1968, and studied Norwegian and Religion history in Oslo from 1969 to 1970. She started working as a teacher in Vadsø Lower Secondary school from 1971 to 1976, and then moved to Steinkjer Municipality where she worked from 1976 to 2000. She had taken extra part-time education in pedagogy in Trondheim (1977–78) and Christianity (1978).

She was elected to the municipal council of Steinkjer Municipality in 1979, and re-elected in 1983, sitting until 1987. The last two years, she was on the executive board. From 1980 to 1983, she also sat as a deputy in the county council in Nord-Trøndelag, for the Committee for Culture. During the 1980s, she led the Gro Group and Kristofer Book Café, and was on the board of the Socialist Left Party in Steinkjer. She chaired the local party chapter from 1988 to 1991 and was county leader from 1991 to 1993, when she also sat on the national board. She was elected to the Norwegian Parliament in the 1993 election, representing Nord-Trøndelag. Hageler sat in the Standing Committee for Family Affairs, Cultural Affairs and Administration. She also sat on the Committee for Elections. She sat in the delegations to the United Nations General Assembly and was deputy for the delegations to the Nordic Council.

Hageler was not re-elected in the 1997 election. From 1998 to 2000, she took a part-time studies at Lillehammer University College in information technology. From 1999 to 2000, she sat on the Committee for Cinema Policy. From 2000 to 2004, she worked for the Organization for Security and Co-operation in Europe in Bosnia and Herzegovina, after which she retired.
