= Annie Blakstad =

Norwegian politician (1935–2023)

Annie Stand Blakstad
- Born: 8 September 1935
- Died: 12 February 2023 (aged 87)
- Occupation: Politician
- Political party: Conservative Party (Norway)

Annie Stang Blakstad (8 September 1935 – 12 February 2023) was a Norwegian politician for the Conservative Party.

== Biography ==
=== Life ===
Blakstad was born in Oslo on September 8, 1935, and grew up there, as well as in Eidskog Municipality. She married Gudolv Blakstad, and the couple settled as landowners at Vøyen farm in Nes Municipality in Akershus county. They were both from wealthy families, and Crown Prince Harald was a guest at their wedding in Haslum Church.

=== Death ===
Blakstad died in February 2023 at Kongsvinger Hospital.

== Career ==
In Nes, Blakstad chaired Nes Women's Council (a branch of the Norwegian National Women's Council) for twelve years. She became involved in local politics and was elected to the municipal council of Nes Municipality in 1971. From 1975 to 1983 she served two terms in Akershus county council. She also served as a deputy representative to the Parliament of Norway from Akershus during the term 1977–1981. In total, she met during 23 days of parliamentary session.

Blakstad was the first female chairperson of the NLVF research council. Other positions within agriculture and forestry include board membership in the Norwegian Institute of Land Inventory from 1990 to 1993. Leading Nes Art Association for 13 years, she was also a deputy board member of the National Gallery of Norway (1986–1993) and Statens kulturminneråd (1983–1987).
