= Rolf Seljelid =

Norwegian physician

Rolf Seljelid (1934 – 13 June 2023) was a Norwegian physician.

Hailing from Levanger Municipality, Seljelid took the cand.med. degree at the University of Bergen in 1959 and the dr.med. degree at the Karolinska Institute in 1966. He was a docent at the Karolinska Institute, and also a guest researcher at the Rockefeller Institute for Medical Research, before becoming a chief physician at the Radium Hospital. In 1972 he was appointed as a professor of pathology at the newly founded University of Tromsø. He was the dean of the Faculty of Medicine from 1975 to 1977. He was a fellow of the Norwegian Academy of Science and Letters.

Seljelid has been credited for instituting the idea that Norway should cultivate young elite researchers to a larger degree. His inspiration came from the strenuous Norwegian efforts to cultivate young elite sportspeople.

He was a long-term consultant for Biotec Pharmacon, later renamed Arctic Zymes Technologies. He was also a newspaper columnist in Nordlys. After holding a series of causeries in NRK radio in 1983–84, they were issued in the book Men noen stener kan fly and published by Universitetsforlaget.

Following his retirement in 2004, he mainly resided at Ursvik in Nesodden Municipality. He died at the age of 89 and was buried at Nesodden.
