= Bea Ballintijn =

Norwegian swimmer (1923–2023)

Personal information
- Birth name: Berendina Ballintijn
- National team: Norway
- Born: 9 May 1923; Utrecht, Netherlands
- Died: 29 June 2023 (aged 100)

Sport
- Sport: Swimming Aquatics
- Event: 1948 Summer Olympics
- Strokes: Backstroke
- Club: Oslo Kappsvommingsklubb

Berendina Ballintijn (9 May 1923 – 29 June 2023) was a Norwegian backstroke swimmer who competed in the 1948 Summer Olympics. Ballintijn turned 100 in May 2023, and died one month later, on 29 June 2023.
