= Tom Hegg =

American author and actor

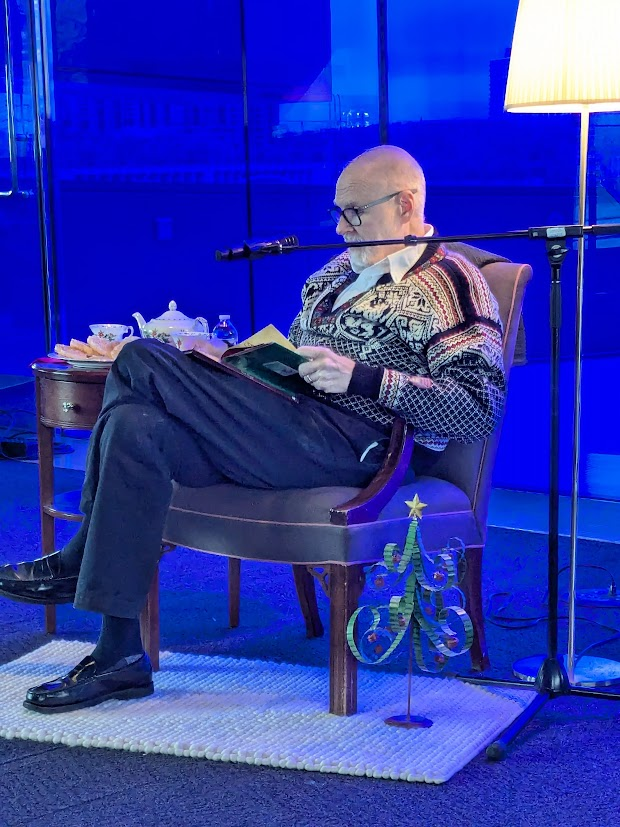
Hegg reading A Cup of Christmas Tea on the "Endless Bridge" of the Guthrie Theater in 2024.

Tom Hegg is an American author, teacher and theatrical professional who performed for many seasons as a member of the Tyrone Guthrie Theatre in Minneapolis, Minnesota. He is best known for selling 1.5 million copies of his first book, A Cup of Christmas Tea, illustrated by Warren Hanson.

== Biography ==
Tom Hegg taught drama at Breck School in Golden Valley, Minnesota, from the early 1980s until 2016. Hegg received the honor of being named a Master Teacher. Many of his students have gone on to successful careers in the dramatic arts; probably the most famous of them is Marisa Coughlan. Erik Stolhanske, a member of the Broken Lizard Comedy group, was also a student, and starred alongside Coughlan. Charlie Korsmo also was a student of Hegg's, but this was after most of his films. Bobby McFerrin's son was enrolled at Breck and performed in at least one major Breck musical production directed by Hegg when McFerrin served as a Guest Conductor of the Minnesota Orchestra.

Tom Hegg retired from teaching in 2017. He lives with wife Peggy Hegg in Eden Prairie, Minnesota.

== Works ==
Hegg wrote A Cup of Christmas Tea in 1981, when his pastor asked him to write something for his church's 125th anniversary. Drawing on childhood memories, he composed a straightforward, sentimental poem. The book was illustrated by Warren Hanson. The first edition, published in 1982, sold 1.5 million copies.

Hegg and Hanson's working relationship continued with nine more illustrated books including three books featuring a colorful bear named Peef. Hegg has also collaborated on The Handsome Prince with illustrator Kevin Cannon.

Hegg's subsequent books have included Mark of the Maker, which focuses on Joseph, father of Jesus; Up to the Lake, a collection of poems focused around a family's trip to their vacation home, the "Peef" series of books about the adventures of a teddy bear, and To Nourish Any Flower: The Request Collection, which is a collection of poems he wrote and presented to family, friends, and students over the course of several years.

His book Little Dickens: A Droll and Most Extraordinary Christmas merges characters from several of Dickens' works, set to a new story in verse.
