= Grethe W. Bjørlo =

Norwegian politician

Grethe Westergaard Bjørlo (9 May 1932 – 22 September 2023) was a Norwegian politician for the Labour Party.

Born in Denmark, her family moved to Ålesund when she was 12 years old. She married Bjørn Bjørlo and had two children. She started her career in the 1960s as a schoolteacher, and taught at Skarbøvik lower secondary school from 1967.

Her political career started in 1963 when she was elected to Ålesund city council. She was also elected as a deputy representative to the Parliament of Norway from Møre og Romsdal, serving during the term 1969–1973.

In 1979 she finished her fourth term in Ålesund city council, and was instead elected to Møre og Romsdal county council. Here, she served five terms until 1999. From 1992 through 1995 she sat as county mayor. She moreover served a second term as a deputy representative to the Parliament of Norway during the term 1997–2001. In total she met during 12 days of parliamentary session. Ultimately, she returned to Ålesund city council where she served two terms from 1999 to 2007. Upon leaving, she had been a councilwoman on the local and regional level for 44 continuous years. Outside of politics, Bjørlo was a member of the Norwegian Association of Local and Regional Authorities' executive committee among others.

Political offices
Preceded by Lars Ramstad	County mayor of Møre og Romsdal; 1992–1995	Succeeded by Ole Øverland
