= Inger Nafstad =

Norwegian-Saami veterinarian

Inger Nafstad, née Danneborg (17 April 1934 – 22 May 2023) was a Norwegian-Saami veterinarian and toxicologist.

== Personal life ==
She was born in Hemsedal Municipality as a daughter of South Sámi-Swedish reindeer herder Odd Danneborg and Anne, née Grøthe. She grew up in Grøndalen with eight siblings and two half-siblings before attending school in Hemsedal Municipality and Voss Municipality.

She married Per Nafstad in 1958. They had two children.

== Career ==
After finishing her secondary education in 1954, she took the examen philosophicum at the University of Bergen in 1955, but moved to Oslo where she graduated from the Norwegian School of Veterinary Science with the cand.med.vet. degree in 1961. She was employed as a research assistant at the Norwegian School of Veterinary Science from 1961 and prosector from 1967.

In 1970 she took the dr.med.vet. degree with the doctoral thesis Studies of Experimental Vitamin E Deficiency in Pigs. She thereby became the first woman in Norway with a doctorate in veterinary medicine. Her doctoral adviser was Rolf Svenkerud and her opponents Sven Rubarth and Torstein Hovig.

Nafstad was promoted from prosector to docent in 1974. After a spell as professor of pharmacology and toxicology at the University of Nairobi from 1978 to 1980, she returned to the Norwegian School of Veterinary Science where she was promoted to professor in 1985. In 1997 she received an honorary degree at the Norwegian College of Agriculture. She was a fellow of the Norwegian Academy of Science and Letters.

Nafstad was also a central board member of the Norwegian Veterinary Association, executive committee member of NLVF as well as several other boards and committees. She was active in Soroptimist International.
