= Kjell Rasmussen =

Norwegian diplomat (1927–2023)

Kjell Rasmussen (5 October 1927 – 14 June 2023) was a Norwegian diplomat.

== Life and career ==
Kjell Rasmussen was born in Trondhjem and was a mag.art. (PhD equivalent) by education. He started working for the Norwegian Ministry of Foreign Affairs in 1956. He served as the Norwegian ambassador to Greece from 1981 to 1986, and doubled as ambassador to Libya from 1984. He was the general inspector of the Norwegian foreign service from 1986 to 1989 and the Norwegian ambassador to Finland from 1989 to 1994.

Rasmussen died in Asker on 14 June 2023, at the age of 95.
