= Anne Borg (physicist) =

Norwegian professor of physics

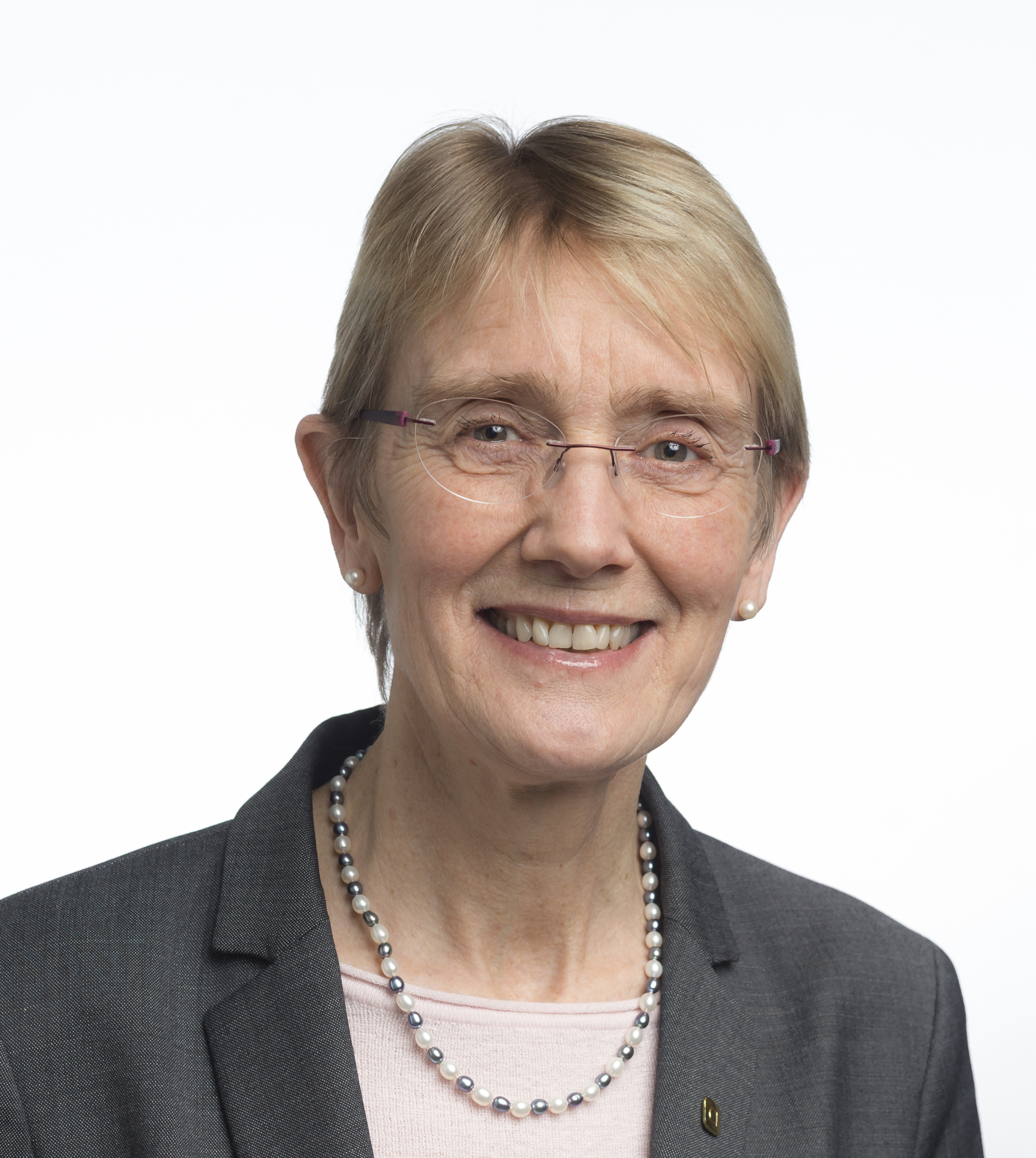
- Anne Borg in 2017
- Born: September 27, 1958 (age 67); Drammen
- Occupations: Rector of the Norwegian University of Science and Technology (NTNU), professor of physics at NTNU
- Honours: Honorary doctor of Lund University, Sweden

Anne Borg (born September 27, 1958) is a Norwegian professor of physics and was rector (2019–2023) at the Norwegian University of Science and Technology in Trondheim. She was prorector of education at NTNU from August 1, 2017, to August 20, 2019. She was appointed acting rector of NTNU on August 21, 2019, later being officially employed as rector on December 13 the same year.

Her areas of research are surface and materials physics, scanning probe microscopy, photoelectron spectroscopy and density functional theory.

== Education and professional career ==
Borg was born in Drammen. She has an Msc (sivilingeniør) in applied physics from the Norwegian Institute of Technology (NTH), Trondheim, (1982), and in 1987 she received her PhD in physics at NTNU, with the thesis Infrared spectroscopy for studies of molecular vibrations at surfaces : construction and testing of a wavelength modulation infrared spectrometer.

After having finished her PhD, she worked as a post doctor at Stanford University, Stanford Synchrotron Radiation Laboratory in 1988–1989, and held various research positions at NTH, NTNU and SINTEF.

In 1998 she was appointed professor at the Department of Physics, NTNU.

She has been a strong voice in Norway for the development of synchrotron light research, especially towards, and in cooperation with, the MAX-lab in Lund. She was also a member of the MaS-lab board between 2006 and 2010, and of the MAX IV Laboratory Program Advisory Committee (PAC in the period 2011–2014 She is currently (2018) chairing the Scientific Advisory Committee (SAC) at MAX IV Laboratory.

== Publications (selection) ==
- List of publications by Anne Borg (physicist) in BIBSYS (Norway)
- List of publications by Anne Borg in CRIStin (The Norwegian Scientific Index)

== Memberships and honours ==
She is elected member of The Royal Norwegian Society of Sciences and Letters, and of the Norwegian Academy of Technological Sciences (NTVA).

She was vice president of the Norwegian Physical Society in 2002–2003, and president of the society in 2004–2007.

In 2018 she was awarded an honorary doctorate at Lund University in Sweden.
