= Eric A. Hegg =

Swedish-American photographer (1867–1947)

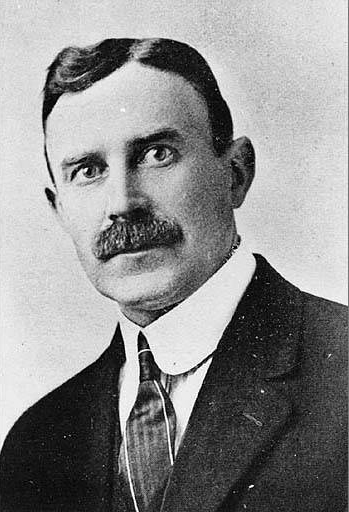
- Hegg circa 1910 to 1920
- Born: Erik Jonsson; September 17, 1867; Bollnäs, Sweden
- Died: December 13, 1947 (aged 80); Bellingham, Washington, U.S.
- Other name: Eric A. Hägg

Eric A. Hegg (September 17, 1867 – December 13, 1947) was a Swedish-American photographer who portrayed the people in Skagway, Bennett and Dawson City during the Klondike Gold Rush from 1897 to 1901. Hegg himself participated in prospecting expeditions with his brother and fellow Swedes while documenting the daily life and hardships of the gold diggers.

The most iconic photograph taken by Hegg is of the Chilkoot Pass where miners and prospectors are climbing the ice stairs upwards to the top and the awaiting Canada–US border. He also captured the scenery through which the White Pass and Yukon Route was awesomely situated. Hegg has been featured in books and films in Sweden depicting his life as an example of The American Dream since he was able to leave his humble situation in Sweden behind and become a self-made man and photographer.

== Life and career ==
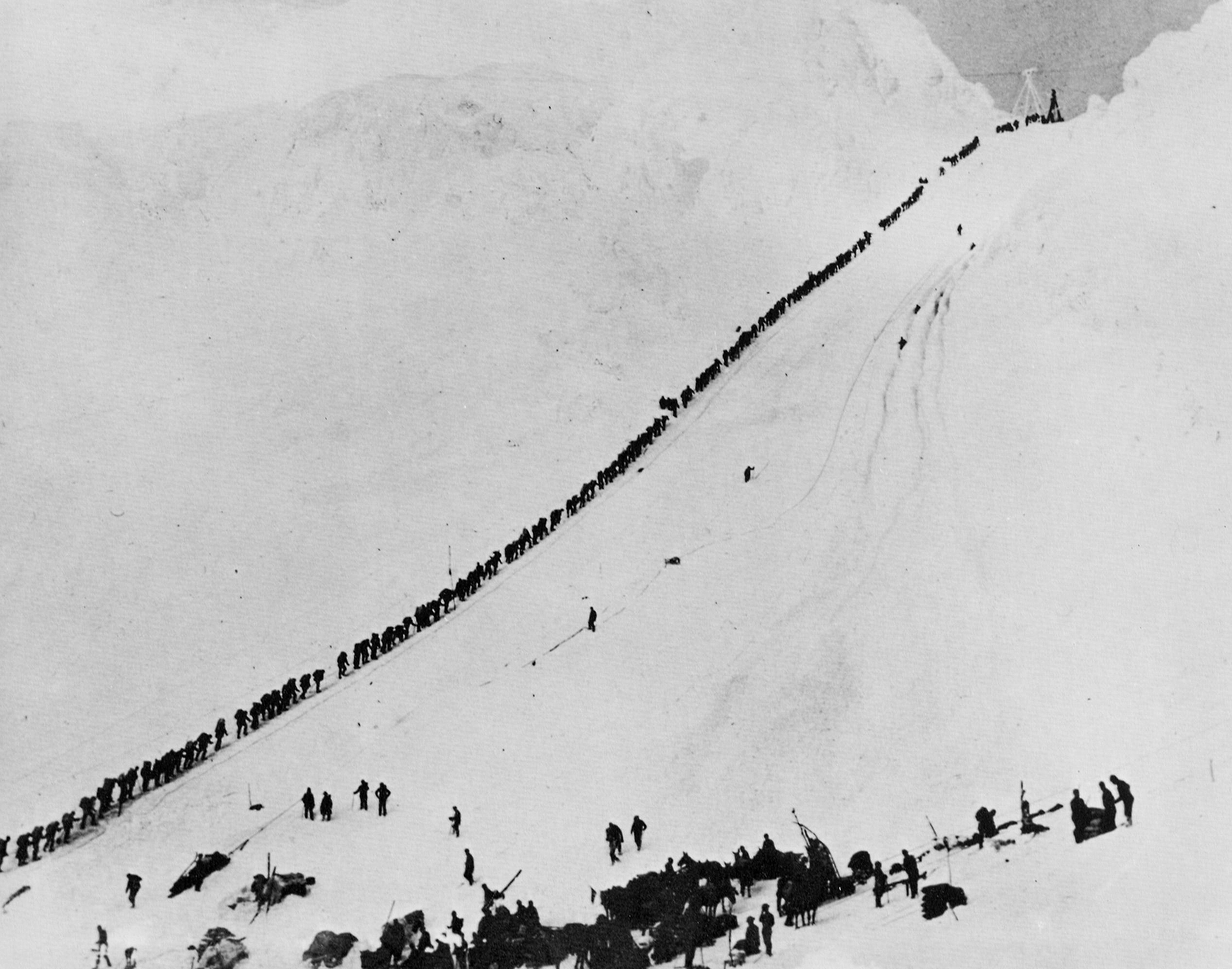
Chilkoot Trail by Eric A. Hegg, 1898. Miners and prospectors at The Scales climbing the mountainside using the steps cut in the ice

=== Early life ===
Hegg was born as Erik Jonsson in 1867 in Bollnäs socken, Hälsingland, Sweden, as the second eldest son to the crofter Jon Persson and his wife Brita Ersdotter in a family of eight (four sons and two daughters). Due to repeated displacement to smaller outfields deeper into the forest land, the whole family left for United States in April 1881. At the arrival in New York City the family gave up their Swedish surnames and adopted the family name Hegg (derived from Heggesta, the name of their Swedish area of origin). The family settled in the Swedish settlements at the southern shore of Lake Superior in Wisconsin and the fourteen-year-old Eric Hegg took up the profession as a photographer's disciple in Cloquet, Minnesota and later opened his own studio in Washburn, Wisconsin.

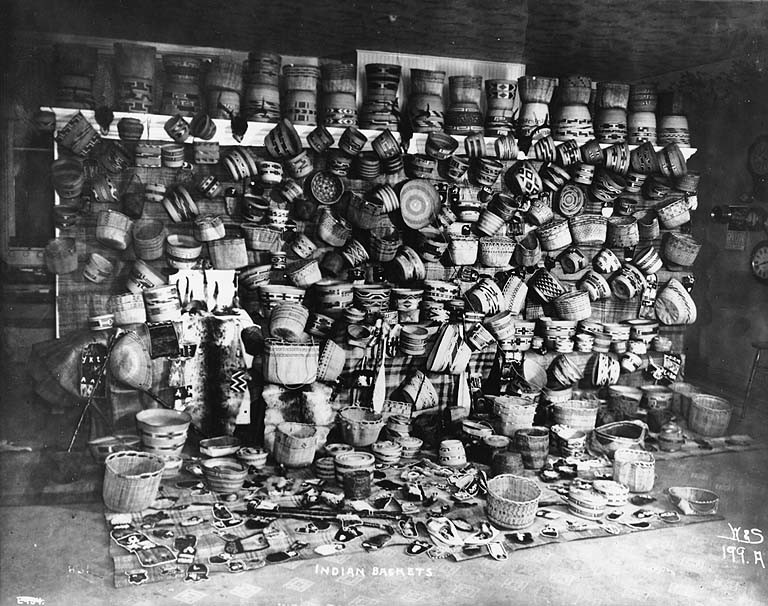
Tlingit and Aleut baskets and beadwork ca. 1898 (Webber & Stevens reprint)

In 1888, Eric Hegg settled in the Swedish community outside Bellingham, Washington and together with his brother Peter he opened a new studio. After some years depicting foresters and farmers in the region the city got gold fever after another Swedish-American man returned rich from the Klondike Gold Rush. This sparked a wave of migration of young men to Alaska and Northwestern Canada. The Hegg brothers followed in their trail to open up new grounds for their photographic business.

=== Klondike Gold Rush ===
In October 1897 Hegg arrived in Skagway after a short stop in Dyea. He immediately opened a studio in the town. He was joined a year later by his brother and a friend of the two brothers, Peter Andersson. The following spring another Swedish-American photographer, Per Edvard Larss, came and joined the business.

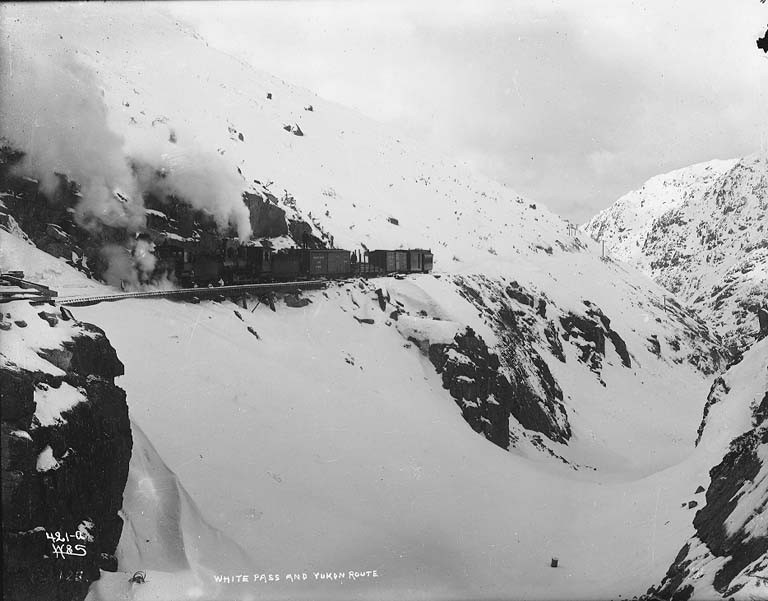
White Pass & Yukon Route ca. 1899

The arrivals led to a series of expeditions along The Chilkoot Trail and further north and west to Dawson and Yukon via Bennett taking numerous pictures along the way. Hegg built a darkroom on his boat he used when travelling along the river Klondike. The Hegg brothers together with their companions opened studios in Dawson and sold portraits to the frontier men and they also claimed land and participated in the mining.

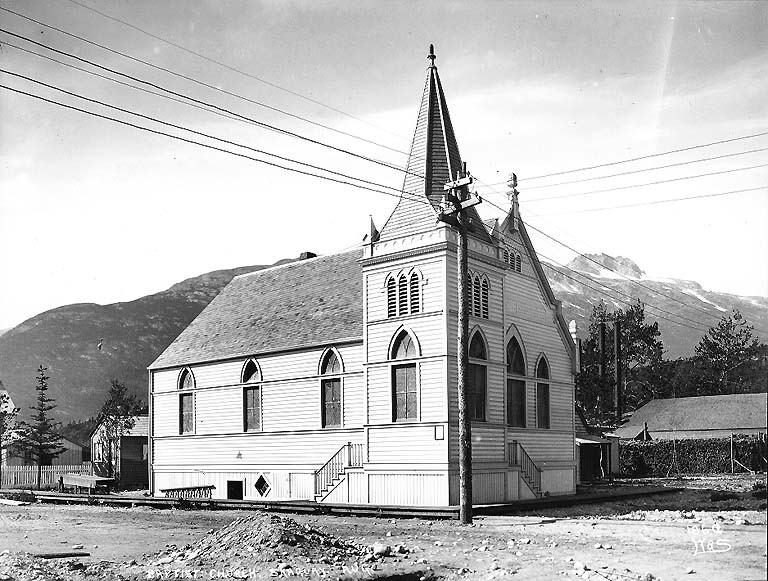
First Baptist Church in Skagway ca. 1899

In 1899, after a year in Yukon, Hegg returned to Skagway leaving his studio in Dawson to his business companion Larss and another famous Klondike photographer, Joseph E.N. Duclos (Larss & Duclos). Hegg travelled to New York the same year to show his pictures at a gallery, while his brother returned to Bellingham to manage their old studio. When returning to Alaska, Eric Hegg travelled to Nome visiting other Swedes working in the area and took pictures of the social life and the town. Among the customers were the "Three Lucky Swedes" who were first in Nome to become rich by mining. Their portraits were taken by Hegg and he opened his largest studio so far.

His nomadic lifestyle bore its toll and his relation with his wife Ella became strained. In 1902 his marriage was finalized by a bitter divorce and the studio in Skagway went to his wife who sold it and along with all the negatives. Since the stamp was removed by the buyers it is difficult to identify many of the late Alaska pictures as Hegg's. Before leaving Alaska for a short time in Hawaii, Hegg lived in Nome and then in Cordova, where he worked for Guggenheim's Copper River and Northwestern Railway until 1918.

== Death ==
Hegg returned to Bellingham, Washington to move in with his son and once again he joined his brother to work in their old studio. But the partnership did not last for long. While his brother took up farming, Eric Hegg kept on the business until 1946. He died in San Diego, CA on December 13, 1947.

== Legacy ==
His work has been collected by the daughter of the friend from Skagway, Peter Andersson, and later donated to Archive of University of Washington.

The 1957 National Film Board of Canada documentary City of Gold made extensive use of photographs of the Gold Rush by Hegg, from his University of Washington archives. Dawson City: Frozen Time also uses his images.

== Photo gallery ==
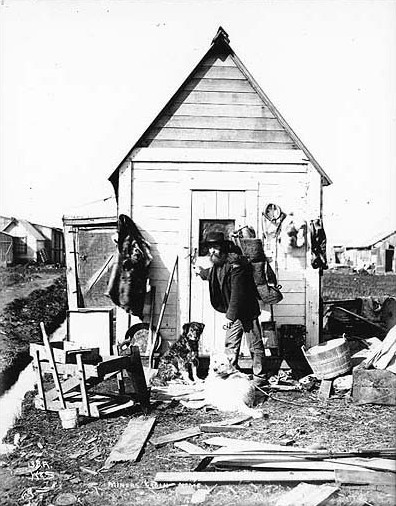
Miner and his dogs ca. 1900

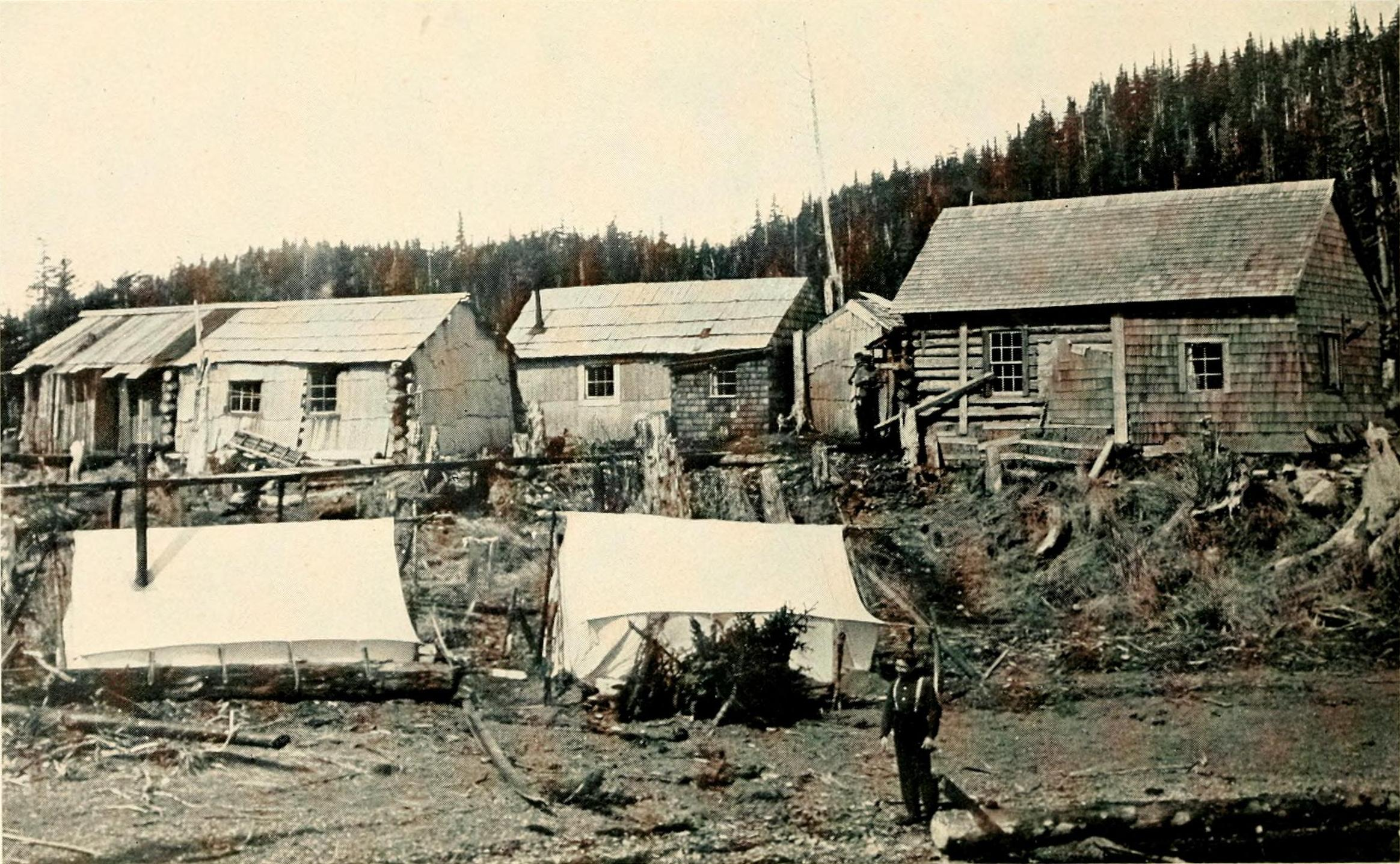
"Indian houses" in Cordova

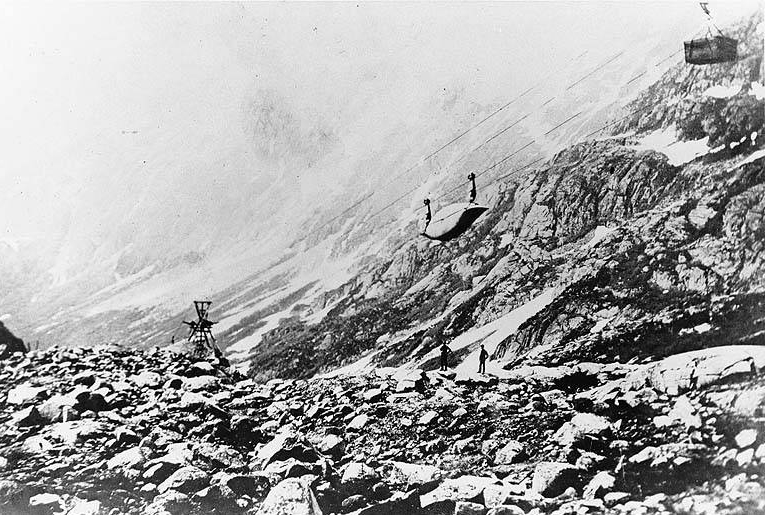
Chilkoot Pass Tramway

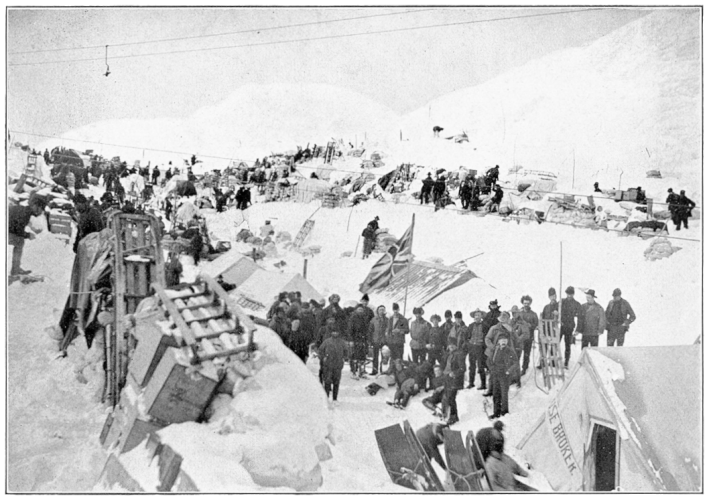
Summit of Chilkoot Pass

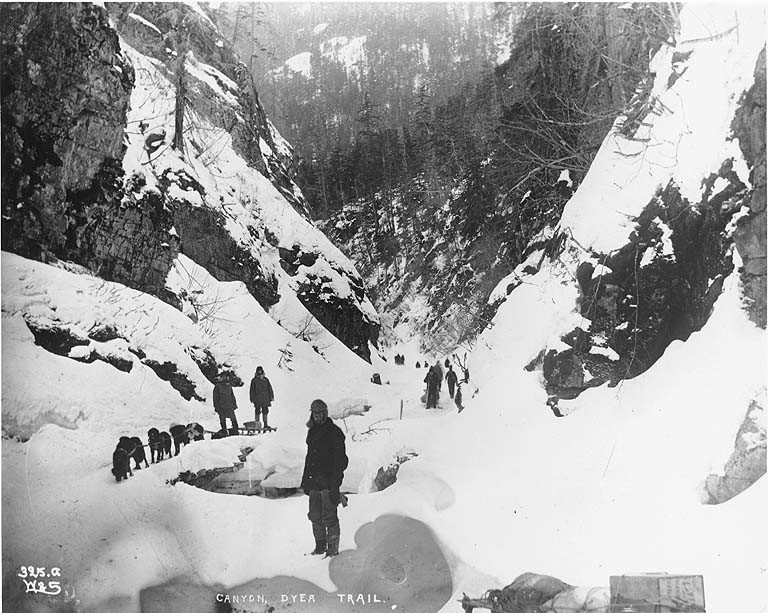
Klondikers with dogsled and supplies

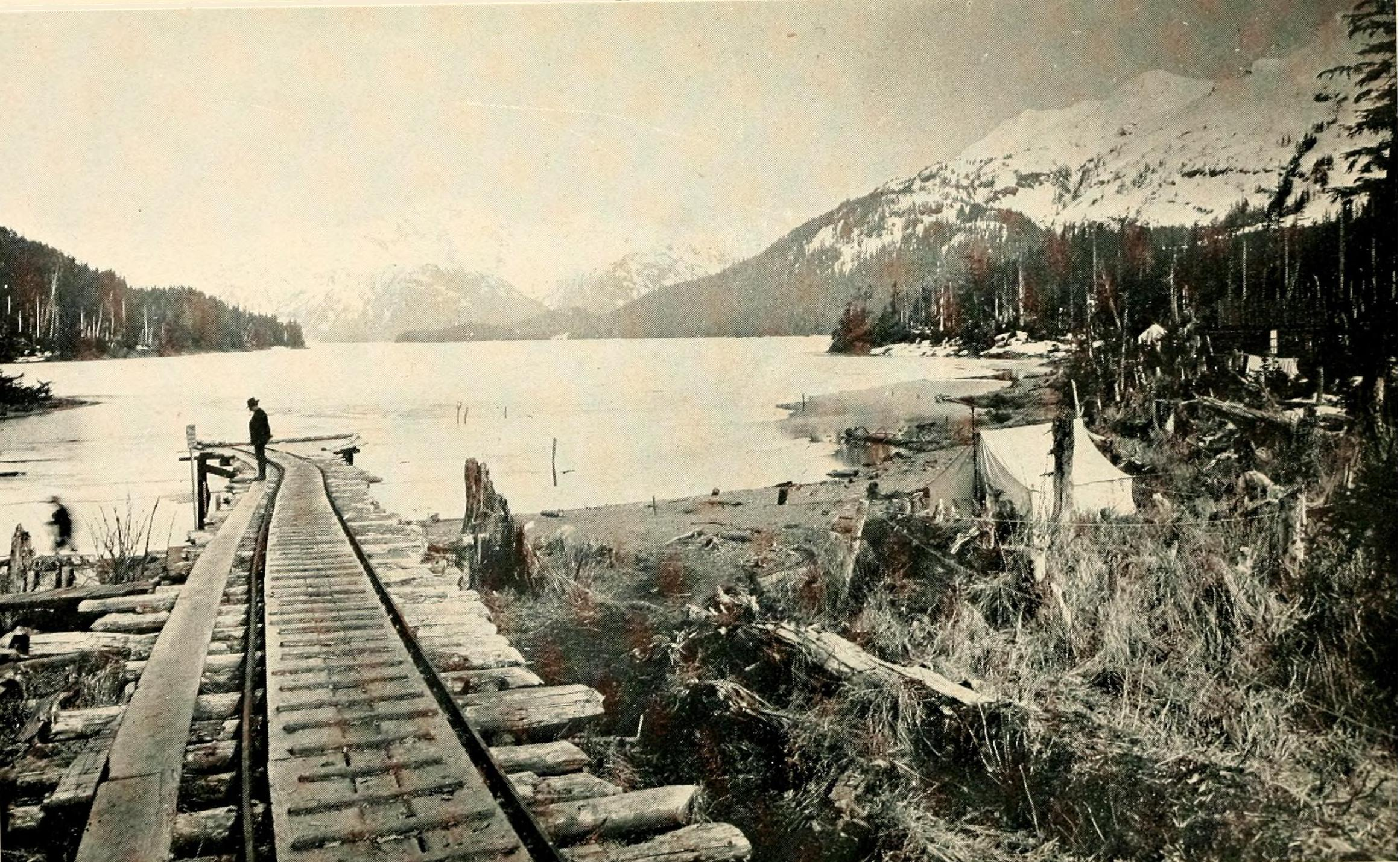
Railroad construction at Eyak Lake, Alaska

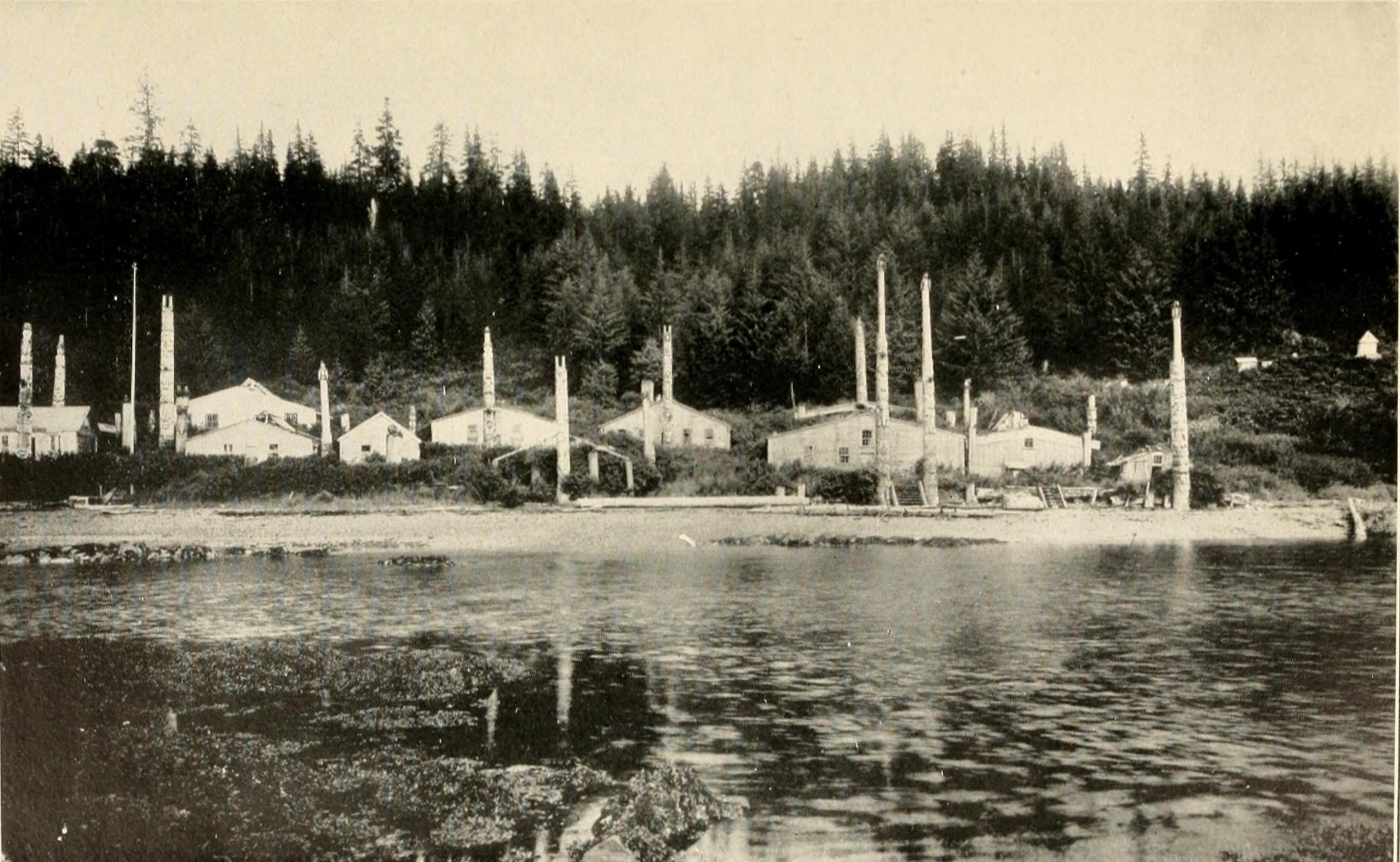
Haida village in Alaska

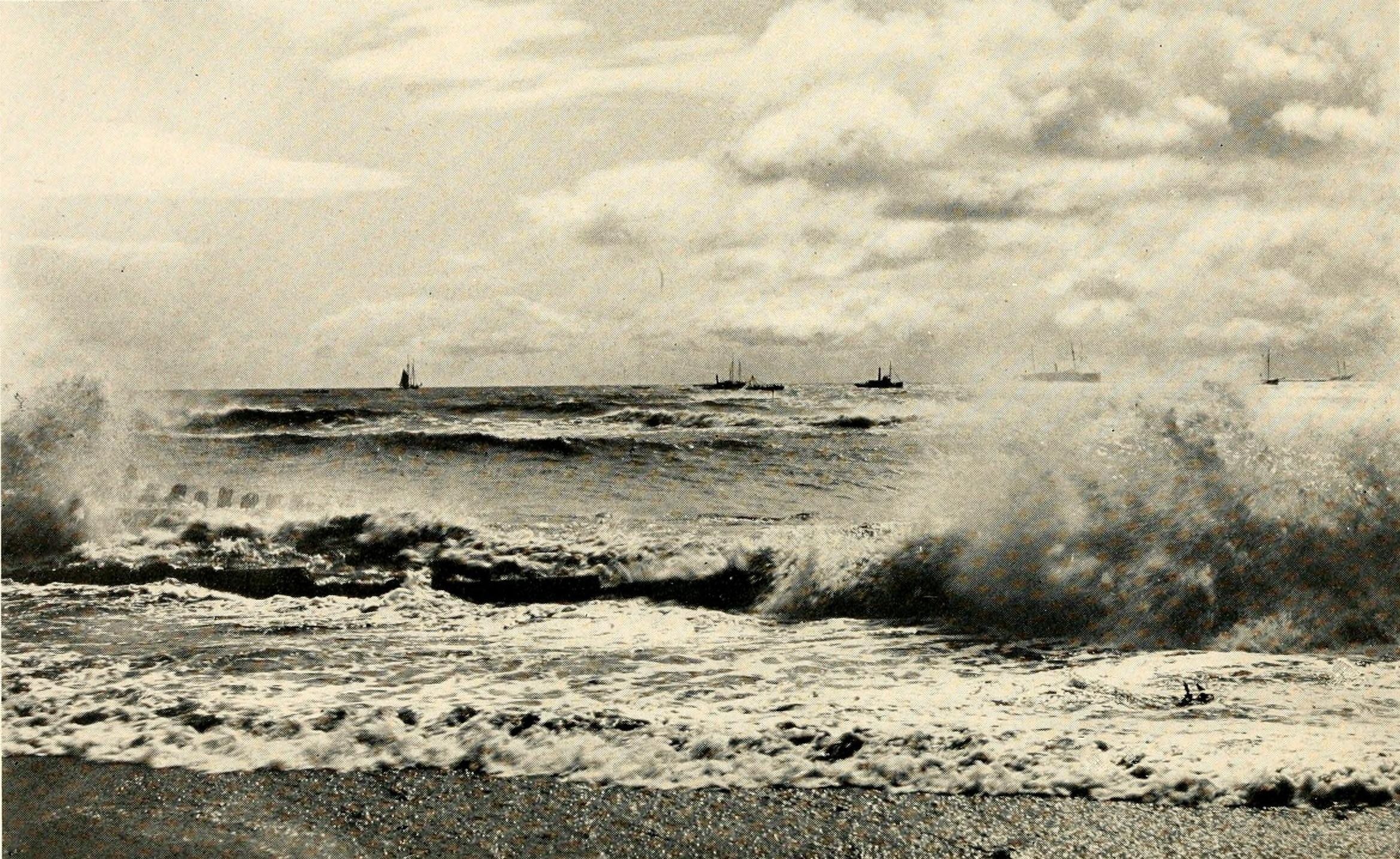
Beach at Nome, Alaska

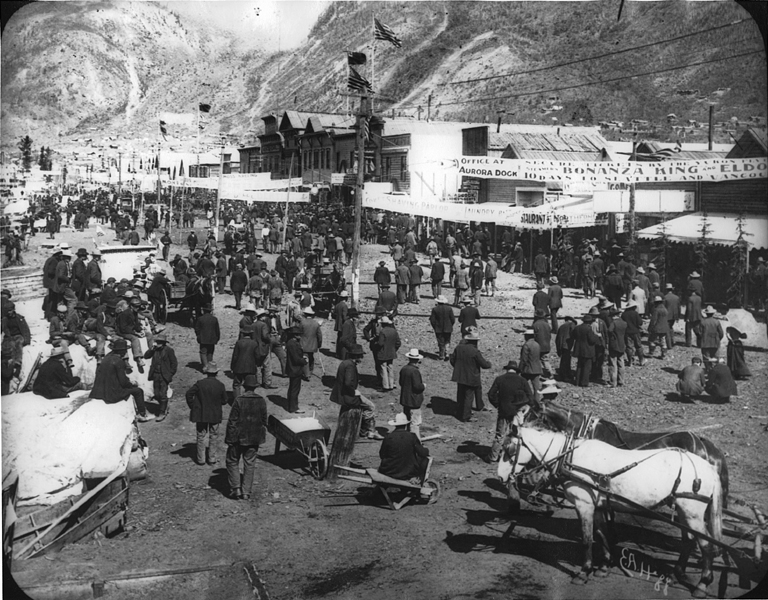
Dawson City, Yukon

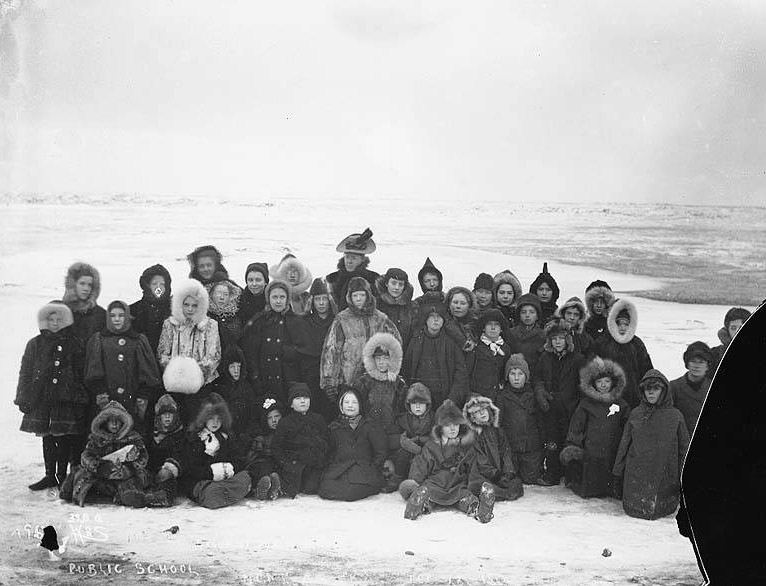
School children in Nome, Alaska

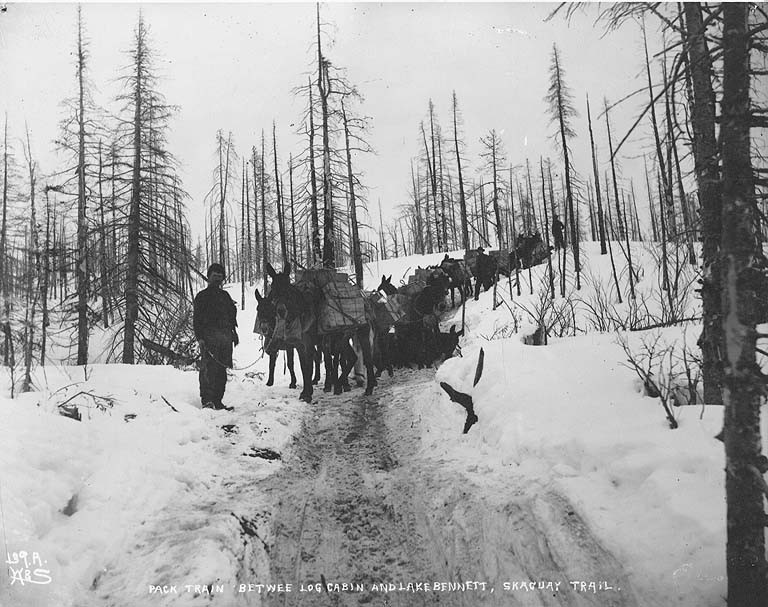
Pack train on the White Pass Trail between Log Cabin and Bennett Lake, British Columbia, ca 1898
