= Jan Wessel Hegg =

Norwegian diplomat

Jan Wessel Hegg (born 1 September 1938) is a retired Norwegian diplomat and ambassador.

He holds a Siviløkonom (literally "civil economist") degree from the Norwegian School of Economics. He served as embassy counsellor in Italy before becoming subdirector in the Ministry of Foreign Affairs in 1988. In 1992 he was promoted to head of department. He was then posted as Norway's ambassador to Greece in 1994, Indonesia in 1998 and Latvia in 2004. He retired in 2004.

Hegg resides at Øvrevoll. He is a distant relative of Peter Wessel.
