= Deaths in May 2023 =

The following is a list of notable deaths in May 2023.

Entries for each day are listed alphabetically by surname. A typical entry lists information in the following sequence:

- Name, age, country of citizenship at birth, subsequent country of citizenship (if applicable), reason for notability, cause of death (if known), and reference.

== May 2023 ==
=== 1 ===
- Per Åhlin, 91, Swedish animator (Out of an Old Man's Head, Dunderklumpen!, The Journey to Melonia).
- Lotta Bouvin-Sundberg, 63, Swedish journalist and news presenter (SVT Rapport), cancer.
- Dick Burwell, 83, American baseball player (Chicago Cubs).
- M. Chandran, 76, Indian politician, Kerala MLA (2006–2016).
- Felipe Colares, 29, Brazilian mixed martial artist, traffic collision.
- Moustafa Darwish, 43, Egyptian actor.
- Calvin Davis, 51, American hurdler, Olympic bronze medalist (1996).
- Andrew Delaplaine, 73, American novelist and screenwriter (Meeting Spencer), stomach cancer.
- John Dunmore, 99, French-born New Zealand academic, historian and author.
- Llambi Gegprifti, 81, Albanian politician, mayor of Tirana (1986–1987, 1989–1990).
- Paul Giambarba, 94, American graphic designer and cartoonist (This Week).
- Gordon Lightfoot, 84, Canadian Hall of Fame singer-songwriter ("Sundown", "The Wreck of the Edmund Fitzgerald", "If You Could Read My Mind").
- Jordan Neely, 30, American subway passenger, compression of the neck.
- G. R. Perera, 83, Sri Lankan actor (Welikathara, Gini Avi Saha Gini Keli, Aswesuma).
- Pugh Rogefeldt, 76, Swedish musician, complications from corticobasal degeneration.
- Eileen Saki, 79, Japanese-American actress (M*A*S*H, Splash, Policewomen), cancer.
- Marshall S. Smith, 85, American educator.
- Everett M. Snortland, 86, American politician, member of the Montana House of Representatives (1970–1971).
- Brendan Walsh, 50, Irish hurler (Killeagh, Cork).
- Duncan Wright, 82, Australian footballer (Collingwood).

=== 2 ===
- Khader Adnan, 45, Palestinian activist, hunger strike.
- Eugeniusz Bedeniczuk, 62, Polish Olympic triple jumper (1992).
- Matahi Brothers, 62, French Polynesian businessman.
- Barbara Bryne, 94, British-American actress (The Bostonians, Amadeus, Two Evil Eyes).
- Gabrielle Carey, 64, Australian author (Puberty Blues).
- Alice Coleman, 99, British geographer.
- Charles Engola, 64, Ugandan politician, MP (2016–2021), shot.
- Heidy Forster, 92, Swiss-German actress (Hinter den sieben Gleisen, The Roaring Fifties, The Foster Boy).
- Arun Manilal Gandhi, 89, Indian-American author and political activist.
- Christian Larièpe, 63, French footballer (FC Montceau Bourgogne) and sporting director (Lausanne Sport, Saint-Étienne), malaria.
- Mzwandile Masala, 85, South African politician, MNA (1997–2004), ambassador to Zambia (2004–2007).
- Sid Ali Mazif, 79, Algerian film director.
- Albert Narath, 90, German-born American chemist.
- Frank Phillips, 90, Australian golfer.
- Mike Pinner, 89, English footballer (Aston Villa, Leyton Orient, Sheffield Wednesday).
- Ruth Porta, 66, Spanish politician, senator (2007–2011).
- Michael Roskin, 84, American political scientist.
- Souli Sabah, 91, Greek singer and actress.
- Guido Sacconi, 74, Italian politician, MEP (1999–2009).
- Damir Šolman, 74, Croatian basketball player, Olympic silver medallist (1968, 1976).
- Achmad Sujudi, 82, Indonesian physician, minister of health (1999–2004).
- Giovanni Urbinati, 76, Italian ceramist and sculptor.
- Valentin Yudashkin, 59, Russian fashion designer, kidney cancer.

=== 3 ===
- Asia Abdelmajid, 80, Sudanese actress and teacher, shot.
- Lance Blanks, 56, American basketball player (Detroit Pistons, Minnesota Timberwolves) and general manager (Phoenix Suns), suicide.
- Bear F. Braumoeller, 55, American political scientist.
- Dean Corren, 67, American politician, member of the Vermont House of Representatives (1993–2001), heart attack.
- Alessandro D'Alatri, 68, Italian film director (Red American, No Skin, The Fever), screenwriter and actor.
- Gustaf Douglas, 85, Swedish aristocrat and investment executive, founder of Investment AB Latour and member of the IVA.
- John Edmunds, 94, British television presenter (ABC Weekend TV, Associated-Rediffusion) and academic.
- Allan Gyngell, 75, Australian public servant and diplomat.
- Kabir Hossain, 84, Bangladeshi politician, MP (1991–2006).
- Razie Jachya, 92, Indonesian politician, governor of Bengkulu (1989–1994).
- Josef Jařab, 85, Czech academic, rector of Palacký University Olomouc (1990–1997) and senator (1996–1998, 2000–2006).
- Howard Krongard, 82, American Hall of Fame lacrosse player, attorney, and government official, inspector general of the Department of State (2005–2008), cancer.
- Ronald Rene Lagueux, 91, American jurist, judge of the U.S. District Court for Rhode Island (since 1986).
- Bernard Lapasset, 75, French rugby union administrator, chairman of the International Rugby Board (2008–2016), Alzheimer's disease.
- Josef Lenz, 88, German luger.
- Linda Lewis, 72, English singer-songwriter ("Rock-a-Doodle-Doo").
- Manobala, 69, Indian film director (December 31) and actor (Gopurangal Saivathillai, James Pandu), liver failure.
- Vicky Neale, 39, British mathematician (Closing the Gap: The Quest to Understand Prime Numbers), cancer.
- Michael O'Halloran, 86, Irish politician and trade unionist, Lord Mayor of Dublin (1984–1985).
- Francisco Paesa, 87, Spanish spy, banker and businessman.
- Roland Pattillo, 89, American physician.
- Carl Reissigl, 98, Austrian politician, member (1979–1994) and president (1989–1994) of the Landtag of Tyrol.
- Don Short, 90, British writer and journalist, heart failure.
- Franc Škerlj, 81, Slovenian Olympic cyclist (1968).
- Tony Staley, 83, Australian politician, MP (1970–1980), minister for the Capital Territory (1976–1977) and post and telecommunications (1977–1980).
- Jasmin Stavros, 68, Croatian pop musician.
- Muhammad Taufik, 66, Indonesian politician, member (since 2009) and deputy speaker (2014–2022) of the Jakarta Regional People's Representative Council, lung cancer.
- Gail Tremblay, 77, American writer and artist.
- Nikica Valentić, 72, Croatian politician, prime minister (1993–1995).
- Neil Wheelwright, 90, American college football coach.

=== 4 ===
- Sir John Aird, 4th Baronet, 83, British aristocrat and businessman.
- Joop van den Berg, 81, Dutch politician, MP (1988–1994).
- Robert Carswell, Baron Carswell, 88, Northern Irish jurist, lord chief justice (1997–2004).
- Bruce Childs, 88, Australian politician, senator (1981–1997).
- Henri Coulonges, 86, French writer.
- John C. Cushman III, 82, American real estate executive (Cushman & Wakefield), national president of the Boy Scouts (2004–2006).
- Rafael Guillén, 90, Spanish poet, stroke.
- Stewart Harris, 74, American songwriter ("Lonely Nights", "Hurricane", "Rose in Paradise").
- Iain Johnstone, 80, English author, broadcaster and television producer.
- Frank Keefe, 85, American swimming coach.
- Petr Klíma, 58, Czech ice hockey player (Detroit Red Wings, Edmonton Oilers, Tampa Bay Lightning), Stanley Cup champion (1990).
- Hans-Jörg Krüger, 81, German Olympic basketball player (1972).
- Rob Laakso, 44, American musician (Kurt Vile and the Violators, Swirlies), cholangiocarcinoma.
- Karaikudi Mani, 77, Indian mridangam player.
- Bill Mondt, 88, American college football player (Colorado Buffaloes) and coach (New Mexico Lobos).
- Achmad Mubarok, 77, Indonesian academic and politician, MP (1999–2009).
- Rifat Rastoder, 72, Montenegrin politician, writer, and journalist, acting president (2003).
- Chris Reynolds, 63, Welsh comics author (Mauretania Comics).
- Tom Spencer, 75, British politician, MEP (1979–1984, 1989–1999), progressive supranuclear palsy.
- Michael Squire, 77, British architect.
- Georgi Stoykovski, 81, Bulgarian Olympic triple jumper (1964, 1968).
- Diane Stratas, 90, Canadian politician, MP (1979–1980).
- Terry Vaughn, 50, American soccer referee, complications from Huntington's disease.
- Robert E. Wade, 89, Canadian politician, mayor of Hamilton (2000–2003).

=== 5 ===
- Martti Aiha, 70, Finnish sculptor.
- Valeriy Baranov, 66, Ukrainian politician, MP (2007–2012), governor of Zaporizhzhia Oblast (2014).
- Gloria Belle, 83, American bluegrass vocalist and musician.
- Fortunato Benavides, 76, American jurist, judge of the U.S. Court of Appeals for the Fifth Circuit (since 1994).
- Ilse Buding, 83, Romanian-born German tennis player.
- Richard E. Carver, 85, American politician, SAF/FM (1984–1987), mayor of Peoria, Illinois (1973–1984) and president of the USCM (1979–1980).
- Michel Cordes, 77, French actor (The Horseman on the Roof, Didier, A Question of Taste), author and stage director, suicide by gunshot.
- Samuel T. Durrance, 79, American astronaut (STS-35, STS-67), complications from a fall.
- Gary Finch, 79, American politician, member of the New York State Assembly (1999–2021).
- George Fouché, 57, South African racecar driver, complications from a fall.
- Haidar Haidar, 87, Syrian novelist (The Desolate Time, A Feast for the Seaweeds, The Mirrors of Fire).
- Arsenio Iglesias, 92, Spanish football player (Deportivo de La Coruña, Granada) and manager (Zaragoza).
- Marc Jeuniau, 95, Belgian sports journalist.
- Terry Lewis, 95, Australian convicted corrupt police officer, commissioner of the Queensland Police Force (1976–1987).
- Christopher William Long, 85, British diplomat, ambassador to Switzerland (1988–1992), Egypt (1992–1995) and Hungary (1995–1998).
- Jesús Mancha, 81, Spanish politician, senator (1996–2000), deputy (2000–2008).
- Fozi el-Mardi, 69–70, Sudanese football player, coach, and administrator.
- Bruce McCall, 87, Canadian author and illustrator (The New Yorker, Zany Afternoons), complications from Parkinson's disease.
- Brian McKenna, 77, Canadian filmmaker and producer (The Fifth Estate, The Valour and the Horror).
- Ray Newman, 77, American baseball player (Milwaukee Brewers, Chicago Cubs).
- Hany Moustafa, 75, Egyptian footballer (Al Ahly, national team) and manager (national team).
- Pauline Newstone, 79, Canadian actress (Dragon Ball Z, Beast Wars: Transformers, Adventures of Sonic the Hedgehog).
- Carlos Padilla, 78, Filipino politician, three-time member of the House of Representatives, governor of Nueva Vizcaya (since 2016), heart attack.
- Mary Price, 79, English lawn bowler.
- Siiri Rantanen, 98, Finnish cross-country skier, Olympic champion (1956).
- Gerald Rose, 87, British illustrator.
- Robert C. Shinn Jr., 85, American politician, member of the New Jersey General Assembly (1985–1994) and commissioner of the NJDEP (1994–2002).
- Amy Silverstein, 59, American writer, cancer.
- Philippe Sollers, 86, French writer and literary critic, founder of Tel Quel and L'Infini, subject of Writer Sollers.
- Chris Strachwitz, 91, American record company founder and executive (Arhoolie Records).
- Beverly Torok-Storb, 75, American physician.
- Sophia Vari, 82–83, Greek painter and sculptor.
- Ján Vilikovský, 85, Slovak translator and diplomat, ambassador to the United Kingdom (1992–1996).
- Brian Warner, 83, British-South African astronomer.
- Jack Wilkins, 78, American jazz guitarist.
- Ian Witten, 76, English-born New Zealand computer scientist.

=== 6 ===
- Pietro Barucci, 100, Italian architect and urban planner.
- Ivan Bizjak, 67, Slovenian mathematician and politician, minister of the interior (1993–1994) and of justice (2000–2004).
- Vida Blue, 73, American baseball player (Oakland Athletics, San Francisco Giants, Kansas City Royals), three-time World Series champion (1972, 1973, 1974).
- Anthony Cartwright, 82, New Zealand cricketer (Otago, North Otago).
- Habib Chaab, 49, Iranian-Swedish political activist, founder of the ASMLA, execution by hanging.
- Jim Copeland, 84, Canadian football player (Saskatchewan Roughriders, Toronto Argonauts, Montreal Alouettes).
- Sam Gross, 89, American cartoonist (The New Yorker).
- Norman Hill, 87, English cricketer (Nottinghamshire).
- Hadley Hinds, 76, Barbadian Olympic sprinter (1968).
- Tom Hornbein, 92, American mountaineer.
- Derek Keating, 67, Irish politician, TD (2011–2016).
- Ulrich F. Kocks, 93, German-born American physicist.
- Frank Kozik, 61, American artist and graphic designer.
- Marc Lalonde, 93, Canadian politician, MP (1972–1984), minister of finance (1982–1984) and justice (1978–1979).
- Néstor Matamala, 82, Chilean football manager (Motagua, Real España, Olimpia).
- Eugeniusz Matyjas, 71, Polish politician, voivode of Leszno Voivodeship (1990–1994).
- Newton N. Minow, 97, American attorney, chairman of the Federal Communications Commission (1961–1963), heart attack.
- Paulus Moa, 82, Indonesian bureaucrat and politician, regent of Sikka (1998–2003).
- Raimo Partanen, 82, Finnish Olympic skier (1964).
- Hanna Fenichel Pitkin, 91, German-born American political theorist.
- Gary Prado Salmón, 84, Bolivian military officer and diplomat, ambassador to Mexico (2000–2002).
- Menahem Pressler, 99, German-born Israeli-American pianist (Beaux Arts Trio).
- Erika Raue, 85, German Olympic javelin thrower (1956).
- Petruška Šustrová, 75, Czech dissident (Charter 77), journalist, and translator.
- Gianluca Tonetti, 56, Italian road racing cyclist, heart attack.
- Nabeesa Ummal, 92, Indian politician, Kerala MLA (1987–1991).
- Joe Young, 89, Irish Gaelic footballer and hurler (Galway).

=== 7 ===
- David Albiston, 78, Australian footballer (Hawthorn).
- Jerry Armstrong, 86, American Olympic boxer (1960), complications from Alzheimer's disease.
- Ingrid Arvidsson, 103, Swedish poet, author, and diplomat.
- Balarama, 67, Indian elephant.
- Byrna Barclay, 82, Canadian writer and editor.
- Albert Borgmann, 85, German-born American philosopher.
- Gail Bromley, 72–73, English botanist.
- Grace Bumbry, 86, American operatic mezzo-soprano (Bayreuth Festival), complications from a stroke.
- Soňa Červená, 97, Czech operatic mezzo-soprano (Oper Frankfurt, San Francisco Opera).
- Ralph Cotterill, 91, Australian actor (A Country Practice, E Street, Ultraman: Towards the Future).
- Lindsay Crocker, 64, New Zealand cricketer (Northern Districts) and sports administrator.
- Viktor Djalilov, 71, Uzbek football player and manager (Politotdel, Navbahor, Pakhtakor Tashkent). (death announced on this date)
- Jay P. Dolan, 87, American historian and priest.
- Vladimir Dybo, 92, Russian linguist, member of the Russian Academy of Sciences.
- Ray Fortin, 82, Canadian ice hockey player (St. Louis Blues).
- Aase Foss Abrahamsen, 92, Norwegian writer.
- Larry Foster, 85, American baseball player (Detroit Tigers).
- Hassan Idrissi, 46, Belgian politician, Walloon deputy (2018–2019), suicide.
- Don January, 93, American golfer (PGA Tour, Senior PGA Tour), PGA Championship winner (1967).
- Deacon Jones, 89, American baseball player (Chicago White Sox) and coach (Houston Astros, San Diego Padres).
- Seán Keane, 76, Irish fiddler (The Chieftains).
- James Kerr, 82, American Olympic fencer (1984).
- Jan Klein, 87, Czech-American immunologist.
- Larry Mahan, 79, American Hall of Fame rodeo cowboy, subject of The Great American Cowboy.
- Patrick J. McGrath, 77, Irish Roman Catholic prelate, auxiliary bishop of San Francisco (1989–1998), coadjutor bishop (1998–1999) and bishop (1999–2019) of San José in California.
- Yaseen Akhtar Misbahi, 69, Indian Islamic scholar.
- Saint Obi, 57, Nigerian actor and film producer.
- Palmirinha Onofre, 91, Brazilian television chef and presenter.
- Filippo Ottoni, 84, Italian film director, screenwriter (Detective School Dropouts, A Bay of Blood, Jonah Who Lived in the Whale) and dubbing director.
- John Roland, 81, American news presenter (WNEW-TV, NBC News), complications from a stroke.
- Fred Siegel, 78, American historian and conservative writer.
- Boris Sket, 86, Slovenian zoologist and speleobiologist.
- Vic Stasiuk, 93, Canadian ice hockey player (Boston Bruins, Detroit Red Wings) and coach (Philadelphia Flyers), Stanley Cup champion (1952, 1954, 1955).
- Ronald Steel, 92, American author and biographer (Walter Lippmann).
- Alexandros Varitimiadis, 28, Greek basketball player (PAOK, Filippos Verias, Aries Trikala), cancer.
- Bobby Wilson, 57, American football player (Washington Redskins).
- Myron Worobec, 78, Austrian-born American soccer player (national team).
- Peter Zeindler, 89, Swiss journalist, writer, and playwright.

=== 8 ===
- Tinagaran Baskeran, 32, Malaysian footballer (Penang, Petaling Jaya City), bone cancer.
- K. Patricia Cross, 97, American education scholar.
- Kemal Derviş, 74, Turkish economist and politician, minister of economic affairs (2001–2002) and administrator of the UNDP (2005–2009).
- Sergey Dreyden, 81, Russian actor (About Love, Window to Paris, Russian Ark).
- Wilfried Erdmann, 83, German sailor and author.
- Sidney Fraleigh, 92, Canadian politician, MP (1979–1980, 1984–1988).
- Vern Holtgrave, 80, American baseball player (Detroit Tigers).
- Joe Kapp, 85, American Hall of Fame football player (BC Lions, Minnesota Vikings), coach (California Golden Bears) and executive.
- Rita Lee, 75, Brazilian singer (Os Mutantes), lung cancer.
- Vishwanath Mahadeshwar, 63, Indian politician, mayor of Mumbai (2017–2019).
- Samaresh Majumdar, 79, Indian writer, complications from COPD.
- Erzsi Máthé, 95, Hungarian actress (Before the Bat's Flight Is Done, Two Confessions).
- Neil Matthews, 56, English footballer (Halifax Town, Lincoln City, Stockport County), cancer.
- Jorge Niosi, Argentine-born Canadian academic.
- Benito Pavoni, 86, Italian politician, deputy (1987–1992).
- Robert L. Peters, 68, Canadian graphic designer.
- Stanton Samenow, 81, American psychologist and writer.
- Jerzy Szteliga, 69, Polish politician, MP (1993–2005).
- Pema Tseden, 53, Chinese film director (The Silent Holy Stones, Old Dog, Tharlo), heart attack.
- Iranian blasphemers, hanged:
  - Yousef Mehrdad
  - Sadrollah Fazeli Zare

=== 9 ===
- Heather Armstrong, 47, American blogger, suicide by gunshot.
- John Bland, 77, South African golfer.
- Antonio Carbajal, 93, Mexican football player (León, national team) and manager (Atlético Morelia).
- Denny Crum, 86, American Hall of Fame basketball coach (Louisville Cardinals).
- Edward Cullen, 90, American Roman Catholic prelate, auxiliary bishop of Philadelphia (1994–1998) and bishop of Allentown (1998–2009).
- Josef Ehmer, 74, Austrian historian.
- Blanche Gates, 105, Canadian Anglican liturgist.
- Nurul Islam, 94, Bangladeshi economist.
- Ludwig Koenen, 92, German-born American papyrologist and classical philologist.
- Anna Kolbrún Árnadóttir, 53, Icelandic politician, member of the Althing (2017–2021).
- Liudmila Kovnatskaya, 82, Russian musicologist.
- Jerome B. Lammers, 85, American politician.
- Sir Richard Lawson, 95, British general, commander-in-chief of AFNORTH (1982–1986).
- Wilferd Madelung, 92, German-British author and scholar of Islamic history.
- Mohan Maharishi, 83, Indian theatre director and playwright.
- Eric McCormack, 85, Scottish-born Canadian author.
- David Miranda, 37, Brazilian politician, deputy (2019–2023), gastrointestinal infection.
- Moon Fun Chin, 110, Taiwanese-American supercentenarian, last surviving CNAC pilot.
- Jon Povey, 80, English drummer and keyboardist (Pretty Things).
- Terje Rafdal, 58, Norwegian Paralympic wheelchair curler (2014).
- Joaquin Romaguera, 90, American tenor (The Most Important Man) and actor.
- Allan Sobocinski, 91, Brazilian Olympic sport shooter (1948).
- Arman Soldin, 32, Bosnian-born French journalist (Agence France-Presse), rocket explosion.
- Carl F. Ullrich, 94, American rowing coach and academic administrator.
- Günter Wewel, 88, German operatic bass (Dortmund Opera) and television presenter.
- Tadayoshi Yokota, 75, Japanese volleyball player, Olympic champion (1972).
- Jacklyn Zeman, 70, American actress (General Hospital, One Life to Live, The Bay), cancer.

=== 10 ===
- Utz Aichinger, 84, German Olympic field hockey player (1960, 1968).
- Carlos Jesús Patricio Baladrón Valdés, 78, Cuban Roman Catholic prelate, auxiliary bishop of San Cristóbal de la Habana (1992–1998) and bishop of Guantánamo-Baracoa (1998–2006).
- Hugo Burge, 51, British businessman.
- Massimo Cavezzali, 73, Italian comic book artist.
- Rosemary Crossley, 78, Australian author.
- Vandana Das, 22, Indian surgeon, stabbed.
- Mike Feldman, 95, Canadian politician, Toronto city councillor (1998–2010) and deputy mayor of Toronto (2003–2006).
- Ed Flanagan, 79, American football player (Detroit Lions, San Diego Chargers).
- Virginia von Fürstenberg, 48, Italian artist, poet and fashion designer, fall.
- Ian Hacking, 87, Canadian philosopher and author (The Taming of Chance, Rewriting the Soul, Mad Travelers).
- Rolf Harris, 93, Australian entertainer (Rolf's Cartoon Club, Animal Hospital), singer ("Tie Me Kangaroo Down, Sport"), and convicted sex offender, neck cancer.
- Donald Kirkland, 61, American lieutenant general.
- Gioacchino Lanza Tomasi, 89, Italian musicologist.
- Loonkito, 19, Kenyan lion, speared.
- Jan Lundin, 80, Swedish Olympic swimmer (1964).
- Russ Nicholson, British illustrator (The Warlock of Firetop Mountain).
- Colette Nucci, 73, French actress and director, cancer.
- Enrico Oldoini, 77, Italian film director (Don Matteo, Vacanze di Natale '90, Anni 90) and screenwriter, complications from amyotrophic lateral sclerosis.
- Thelston Payne, 66, Barbadian cricketer (West Indies, national team), pancreatic cancer.
- Metello Savino, 59, Italian Olympic swimmer (1984).
- Arne Strand, 79, Norwegian journalist (Dagsavisen), cancer.
- Sun Jiulin, 85, Chinese engineer, member of the Chinese Academy of Engineering.
- Martin Wiehle, 96, German historian.
- Albert Zwaveling, 95, Dutch surgeon.

=== 11 ===
- András Adorján, 73, Hungarian chess grandmaster and author.
- Kenneth Anger, 96, American filmmaker (Fireworks, Lucifer Rising) and writer (Hollywood Babylon).
- Ana Paula Borgo, 29, Brazilian volleyball player (Volley Bergamo, national team), stomach cancer.
- Nedeljko Bulatović, 84, Serbian footballer (NEC, Tongeren, Fortuna Sittard).
- Hodding Carter III, 88, American journalist and spokesman, U.S. State Department spokesperson (1977–1980).
- Leon Comber, 101, British military officer and author.
- Stanley Engerman, 87, American economist and historian (Time on the Cross: The Economics of American Negro Slavery), myelodysplastic syndrome.
- Joe A. Garcia, 70, American indigenous political activist and musician, president of the National Congress of American Indians (2006–2009).
- Guido Gorgatti, 103, Italian-born Argentine actor (Bárbara atómica, An American in Buenos Aires, Would You Marry Me?).
- Lloyd Inman Hendricks, 81, American politician, member of the South Carolina House of Representatives (1977–1987).
- Beverley Holloway, 91, New Zealand entomologist.
- Karl Sverre Klevstad, 96, Norwegian politician, mayor of Vestvågøy Municipality (1987–1991).
- Marcel Lagorce, 90, French classical trumpeter.
- Long Boi, British Mallard-Indian Runner duck cross. (death announced on this date)
- Teina Maraeura, 72, French Polynesian politician, deputy (1986–2013, 2018–2023) and mayor of Rangiroa (1986–2021).
- Sue Maroroa, 32, New Zealand-English chess player, complications following childbirth.
- Futoshi Nakanishi, 90, Japanese baseball player and manager (Nishitetsu Lions, Nippon Ham-Fighters, Hanshin Tigers), heart failure.
- Barry Newman, 92, American actor (Vanishing Point, The Salzburg Connection, Petrocelli).
- Shaun Pickering, 61, Welsh Olympic shot putter (1996).
- Andy Provan, 79, Scottish footballer (York City, Torquay United, Chester), complications from Alzheimer's disease.
- Jean-Paul Savoie, 76, Canadian social worker and politician, New Brunswick MLA (1987–1999).
- Michael Waterfield, 81, British biochemist.
- Kyrillos William, 76, Egyptian Coptic Catholic hierarch, bishop of Asyut (1990–2021).
- Martha Zelt, 92, American printmaker.

=== 12 ===
- Thembinkosi Apleni, 49, South African politician, delegate to the National Council of Provinces (since 2019).
- Alfonso Buonocore, 90, Italian Olympic swimmer (1952) and water polo player (1956).
- Leroy Cooper, 62, Jamaican-born British photographer. (body discovered on this date)
- Jonathan Crenshaw, 51, American artist, esophageal varices.
- Owen Davidson, 79, Australian Hall of Fame tennis player.
- Don Denkinger, 86, American baseball umpire (Major League Baseball).
- Shaden Gardood, Sudanese singer, mortar fire.
- Ísak Harðarson, 66, Icelandic poet and translator.
- Gerry Hart, 75, Canadian ice hockey player (Detroit Red Wings, New York Islanders, St. Louis Blues).
- Michael J. Juneau, 60, American jurist, judge of the U.S. District Court for Western Louisiana (since 2018).
- Hirut Bekele, 80, Ethiopian singer.
- Aleksandr Karakin, 32, Russian footballer (Khimki), traffic collision.
- Ralph Lee, 87, American puppeteer and special effects artist.
- Bernard Membe, 69, Tanzanian diplomat and politician, MP (2000–2005) and minister of foreign affairs (2006–2015).
- Judy Messer, 89, Australian conservationist.
- Francis Monkman, 73, English musician (Curved Air, Sky, Matching Mole), songwriter and composer, cancer.
- Jacques Mouilleron, 82, French footballer (Angers, Red Star, Caen).
- Joe Mpisi, 56, South African politician, Gauteng MPL (since 2014).
- Michael Norell, 85, American actor (Emergency!) and television writer (The Love Boat, Nash Bridges).
- David Pollock, 81, British humanist.
- Jethabhai Rathod, 86, Indian politician, Gujarat MLA (1967–1971).
- Bruce Robertson, 71, New Zealand rugby union player (Counties, national team).
- Christine Savage, 91, American politician, member of the Maine Senate (2000–2008).
- Fanta Singhateh, 93, Gambian socialite, first lady (1966–1970).
- David Stripp, 88, English cricketer (Sussex).
- Ruth Carol Taylor, 91, American flight attendant.
- Umar Apong, 83, Bruneian nobleman and police officer, commissioner of the Royal Brunei Police Force (1984–1991). (death announced on this date)

=== 13 ===
- Tayeb Belaiz, 74, Algerian jurist, minister of justice (2004–2012).
- Giotto Bizzarrini, 96, Italian automobile engineer.
- Harry Bentley Bradley, 83, American car and toy car designer.
- Peter Brooke, Baron Brooke of Sutton Mandeville, 89, British politician, secretary of state for Northern Ireland (1989–1992) and national heritage (1992–1994), MP (1977–2001).
- Yaqoob Atif Bulbula, 76, Pakistani singer and actor.
- John Flood, 90, English footballer (Southampton, Bournemouth, Headington United).
- Bob Garibaldi, 81, American baseball player (San Francisco Giants).
- Johan Gullichsen, 86, Finnish Olympic sailor (1964).
- Tommy Hays, 93, American guitarist.
- Bill Kelly, 75, American college football coach (West Texas A&M Buffaloes, Eastern New Mexico Greyhounds), pneumonia.
- Rahmatollah Khosravi, 72, Iranian politician, MP (1988–1992).
- Sibylle Lewitscharoff, 69, German writer.
- Phil Nuytten, 81, Canadian entrepreneur.
- Weldon Olson, 90, American ice hockey player, Olympic champion (1960).
- Mary Parker, 92, English-born Australian actress and television presenter.
- Douglas Rowe, 85, American actor (Appointment with Fear, Critters 2: The Main Course, The Incident).
- Eduard Sagalaev, 76, Russian media executive, founder of TV-6 and chairman of the VGTRK (1996–1997).
- Ram G. Takwale, 90, Indian academic administrator, vice-chancellor of YCMOU (1989–1994) and IGNOU (1995–1998).
- Keiko Tanaka-Ikeda, 89, Japanese gymnast, Olympic bronze medallist (1964), brain cancer.
- Jürgen Trumpf, 91, German diplomat and politician, secretary-general of the European Council (1994–1999).
- Carl Yankowski, 74, American businessman (Palm, Inc., Ambient Devices).

=== 14 ===
- József Ács, 92, Hungarian sculptor.
- Billy Wayne Bailey, 65, American politician, member of the West Virginia Senate (1991–2008).
- Doyle Brunson, 89, American Hall of Fame poker player, WSOP champion (1976, 1977).
- Guerrino Riccardo Brusati, 78, Italian Roman Catholic prelate, bishop of Caetité (2003–2015) and Janaúba (2015–2019).
- Loris Chobanian, 90, Armenian-American composer.
- Cornelius, 87, Greek Orthodox prelate.
- Garðar Cortes, 82, Icelandic operatic tenor singer and opera director, founder of The Icelandic Opera.
- Joe Gayton, 66, American screenwriter (Bulletproof, Faster) and television producer (Hell on Wheels), prostate cancer.
- John Giblin, 71, Scottish bass player, sepsis.
- Ingrid Haebler, 93, Austrian pianist.
- Christian Hansen Jr., 91, American politician, member of the Vermont House of Representatives (1981–1982), U.S. Marshal for Vermont (1969–1977, 1982–1984).
- Karl Hesse, 86, German Roman Catholic prelate, auxiliary bishop (1978–1980) and archbishop (1990–2011) of Rabaul, bishop of Kavieng (1980–1990).
- Dame Rosie Horton, 83, New Zealand philanthropist.
- Omar A. Jallow, 76, Gambian politician, leader of the People's Progressive Party (2002–2018), minister of agriculture (2017–2018).
- Billy Masetlha, 68, South African intelligence officer, director of the National Intelligence Agency (2004–2005).
- Gloria Molina, 74, American politician, member of the California State Assembly (1982–1987) and the Los Angeles County Board of Supervisors (1991–2014).
- Ferran Olivella, 86, Spanish footballer (CD Condal, Barcelona, national team).
- Craig Puki, 66, American football player (San Francisco 49ers, St. Louis Cardinals).
- Regīna Razuma, 71, Latvian actress (The Arrows of Robin Hood, Aquanauts, Unfinished Supper).
- John Refoua, 58, American film editor (Avatar, Olympus Has Fallen, Southpaw), complications from bile duct cancer.
- Lamin Swann, 45, American politician, member of the Kentucky House of Representatives (since 2023).
- John Teague, 78, American politician, member of the Alabama House of Representatives (1974–1976) and Alabama Senate (1976–1986), cancer.
- Albert Vecten, 97, French politician, senator (1983–2001).
- Marco Warren, 29, Bermudan footballer (PHC Zebras, national team), traffic collision.
- Samantha Weinstein, 28, Canadian actress (Carrie, D.N. Ace, The Rocker), ovarian cancer.
- Walter Murray Wonham, 88, Canadian mathematician.

=== 15 ===
- Stanley Appel, 89, British television producer (Top of the Pops) and director.
- Bruce Bould, 73, English actor (The Fall and Rise of Reginald Perrin).
- Madjiguène Cissé, 71, Senegalese activist.
- Essambo Ewane, 70, Cameroonian Olympic judoka (1980, 1984).
- Giuseppe Fallarini, 89, Italian racing cyclist.
- Sharon Farrell, 82, American actress (The Stunt Man, It's Alive, Hawaii Five-O).
- Farooque, 74, Bangladeshi actor (Sujon Sokhi, Lathial) and politician, MP (since 2018).
- Belmar Gunderson, 88, American tennis player.
- Billy Guyton, 33, New Zealand rugby union player (Tasman Mako, Blues).
- Hassan Hallak, 77, Lebanese historian.
- Shoaib Hashmi, 87, Pakistani playwright, complications from a stroke.
- Fahd Al-Hayyan, 52, Saudi Arabian actor (Ghashamsham, Tash ma Tash).
- Deborra Hope, 67, Canadian journalist and news anchor (Global BC), complications from Alzheimer's disease.
- Zbigniew Kaczmarek, 76, Polish weightlifter, Olympic bronze medalist (1972).
- Eugene Kozlovsky, 76, Russian writer, screenwriter (Schizophrenia), theatre and film director.
- Robert Lucas Jr., 85, American economist (Lucas critique), Nobel Prize laureate (1995).
- Marty Lynch, 59, Northern Irish Gaelic footballer (John Mitchel, Newry Bosco) and association footballer (Monaghan United), complications from motor neurone disease.
- Chow Tewa Mein, 80, Indian politician, Arunachal Pradesh MLA (since 2014).
- Paris Moayedi, 84, Iranian-British businessman. (death announced on this date)
- Ron Northcott, 87, Canadian Hall of Fame curler.
- Valentin Pozaić, 77, Croatian Roman Catholic prelate, auxiliary bishop of Zagreb (2005–2017).
- Bernt Rosengren, 85, Swedish jazz tenor saxophonist.
- Peter Scott, 92, Australian footballer (Hawthorn).
- Jitka Svobodová, 81, Czech painter, sculptor and academic.
- Anyimchukwu Ude, 81, Nigerian politician, senator (2007–2011).
- Marko Zalaznik, 28, Slovenian footballer (Radomlje, Olimpija Ljubljana).

=== 16 ===
- Akwaboah Snr., Ghanaian singer-songwriter.
- Iñaki Alkiza, 89, Spanish politician and footballer (Hernani, Real Sociedad), mayor of San Sebastián (1979).
- Lynne Allsup, 74, American Olympic swimmer (1964).
- Rodrigo Barnes, 73, American football player (Dallas Cowboys, New England Patriots, Oakland Raiders).
- Frédéric Bastien, 53, Canadian historian and journalist, cardiac arrest.
- Barry Dwolatzky, 71, South African software engineer.
- Mark Gietzen, 69, American anti-abortion and political activist, plane crash.
- Norm Green, 90, American long-distance runner.
- Marlene Hagge, 89, American Hall of Fame golfer, co-founder of the LPGA, complications from a fall.
- Ron Hargrave, 93, American ukulele player and actor (Dance with Me, Henry).
- Ulf Högberg, 77, Swedish Olympic runner (1972, 1976).
- Ian Jarvie, 85, British-born Canadian philosopher.
- Uwe Kitzinger, 95, English economist and political adviser, heart attack.
- Dorothy Knowles, 96, Canadian visual artist.
- Richard Landis, 77, American singer-songwriter, record producer, and music executive.
- Sunday Mbang, 86, Nigerian Methodist prelate.
- Maria Mies, 92, German sociologist.
- Mike the Juggler, 67, New Zealand busker, house fire.
- Dame Patricia Morgan-Webb, 79, British educator and academic.
- Cyril Agodi Onwumechili, 91, Nigerian physicist and academic administrator (University of Ife), member of the Nigerian Academy of Science.
- Reiji Oyama, 96, Japanese pastor, founder of The Biblical Church.
- Pale Male, 32–33, American red-tailed hawk.
- Daniel Paul, 79, French politician, deputy (1997–2012).
- Bill Perkins, 74, American politician, member of the New York State Senate (2007–2017) and City Council (1998–2005, 2017–2021).
- P. K. R. Pillai, 92, Indian film producer (Chithram, Thathamme Poocha Poocha, Ezhu Muthal Onpathu Vare).
- Per Røntved, 74, Danish footballer (Brønshøj Boldklub, Werder Bremen, national team).
- Nelsinho Rosa, 85, Brazilian football player (Flamengo) and manager (Fluminense, Vasco da Gama).
- Inger Sandberg, 92, Swedish children's author (The Little Ghost Godfrey, Lilla Anna och Långa farbrorn).
- Nikolay Shaklein, 79, Russian politician, senator (2009–2011), governor of Kirov Oblast (2004–2009) and deputy prosecutor general (1991–1993).
- Andy Smart, 63, English comedian (The Comedy Store Players), actor and writer.
- Lester Sterling, 87, Jamaican saxophonist (The Skatalites, Byron Lee and the Dragonaires).
- Hari Shankar Tiwari, 89, Indian gangster and politician, Uttar Pradesh MLA (1985–2007), kidney failure.

=== 17 ===
- Ray Austin, 90, British stuntman (The Avengers) and director (Zorro, Magnum, P.I.).
- Livia Bitton-Jackson, 92, Czechoslovak-born American-Israeli author and Holocaust survivor.
- Creative Force, 5, Irish-bred British Thoroughbred racehorse, winner of the British Champions Sprint Stakes (2021).
- Alicia Dussán de Reichel, 102, Colombian anthropologist.
- David Gardner, 82, English cricketer (Wiltshire).
- Graham Gipson, 90, Australian sprinter, Olympic silver medalist (1956).
- "Superstar" Billy Graham, 79, American Hall of Fame professional wrestler (WWWF), multiple organ failure.
- James Hartle, 83, American physicist, complications from Alzheimer's disease.
- S. P. Hinduja, 87, Indian-born British businessman (Hinduja Group) and philanthropist, complications from Lewy body dementia.
- Dvora Kedar, 98, Israeli actress (Lemon Popsicle, Going Steady, Operation Thunderbolt).
- Liu Feng-shueh, 97, Taiwanese choreographer.
- Jean Madelain, 99, French politician, senator (1980–1998) and mayor of Fougères (1965–1971).
- Jovo Mišeljić, 55, Bosnian footballer (Radnički Niš, Aris Limassol, Leotar).
- Chiara Moretti, 67, Italian actress (Seeking Asylum).
- Johnny Morgan, 76, American politician, member of the Mississippi Senate (1983–1991), plane crash.
- Telésforo Pedraza Ortega, 77, Colombian diplomat and politician, deputy (2002–2004, 2005–2006, 2008–2018).
- Jean-Louis Pesch, 94, French cartoonist (Sylvain et Sylvette).
- Marion Rothman, 94, American film editor.
- Sir Brian Smith, 89, English physical chemist.
- Eddie Southern, 85, American hurdler, Olympic silver medallist (1956).
- Charles Stenholm, 84, American politician, member of the U.S. House of Representatives (1979–2005).
- Marge Summit, 87, American LGBT rights activist.
- Kacper Tekieli, 38, Polish alpinist, avalanche.
- Jorrit Tornquist, 85, Austrian-Italian visual artist, color consultant, and theorist.
- Dinmukhammed Ulysbayev, 24, Kazakh road racing cyclist, heart failure.
- Algy Ward, 63, English heavy metal bassist (Tank, The Damned, The Saints).
- Norman Wood, 76, Scottish golfer.
- Lee Yoder, 92, American Olympic hurdler (1952).

=== 18 ===
- Helmut Berger, 78, Austrian actor (Ludwig, The Damned, The Godfather Part III).
- Albert Bregman, 86, Canadian psychologist and academic.
- Jim Brown, 87, American Hall of Fame football player (Cleveland Browns), actor (The Dirty Dozen, Mars Attacks!), and civil rights activist.
- Rashid Buttar, 57, American physician and conspiracy theorist.
- Giuseppe Casale, 99, Italian Roman Catholic prelate, archbishop of Foggia-Bovino (1988–1999) and bishop of Vallo della Lucania (1974–1988).
- Marlene Clark, 85, American actress (Sanford and Son, Slaughter, The Beast Must Die) and model.
- Frank A. DeMarco, 102, Italian-born Canadian chemical engineer and academic administrator, co-founder of the University of Windsor.
- Jimmy Dimos, 84, American politician, member of the Louisiana House of Representatives (1976–1999).
- Wolf-Dieter Hauschild, 85, German conductor, choirmaster and composer.
- Roger C. Heath, 80, American politician, member of the New Hampshire House of Representatives (1978–1984) and senate (1984–1992), complications from Parkinson's disease.
- Harald Jährling, 68, German rower, Olympic champion (1976, 1980).
- Rattan Lal Kataria, 71, Indian politician, MP (since 2014) and minister of state for social justice and empowerment (2019–2021), pneumonia.
- Hugh Maguire, 90, American actor (Cheers, Batman v Superman: Dawn of Justice, Doctor Sleep).
- Mao Jiangsen, 89, Chinese virologist, member of the Chinese Academy of Sciences.
- Buddy Melges, 93, American sailor, Olympic champion (1972).
- Hasanuddin Murad, 65, Indonesian politician, MP (1999–2007).
- Masatoshi Nei, 92, Japanese-born American evolutionary biologist.
- Dick Nourse, 83, American television news anchor (KSL-TV).
- Jan Olsson, 79, Swedish footballer (GAIS, VfB Stuttgart, national team).
- Mehmet Özyürek, 73, Turkish record holder, heart attack.
- Jasaral Quanyşälin, 74, Kazakh politician and journalist, member of the Supreme Council of Kazakhstan (1994–1995), stroke.
- Ray Wilkie, 98, Australian meteorologist and television weather presenter (Nine Network).
- Sam Zell, 81, American businessman.

=== 19 ===
- Lena Adler, 81, Swedish Olympic gymnast (1960).
- Sir Martin Amis, 73, British novelist (London Fields, Money, Time's Arrow), oesophageal cancer.
- Subomi Balogun, 89, Nigerian banker, founder of FCMB.
- Marion Berry, 80, American politician, member of the U.S. House of Representatives (1997–2011).
- Cyril Birch, 98, British-American sinologist and translator.
- Brian Booth, 89, Australian cricketer (New South Wales, national team) and Olympic field hockey player (1956).
- Pete Brown, 82, English poet, lyricist ("I Feel Free", "Sunshine of Your Love", "White Room") and singer, cancer.
- Augusto Góngora, 71, Chilean journalist (Televisión Nacional de Chile), subject of The Eternal Memory, complications from Alzheimer's Disease.
- Arturo Grávalos, 25, Spanish road racing cyclist, brain tumor.
- Kevin Ireland, 89, New Zealand poet, cancer.
- Dževad Karahasan, 70, Bosnian writer, essayist and philosopher.
- Gordon Keddie, 78, Scottish-born American pastor and theologian, prostate cancer.
- Tim Keller, 72, American pastor (Redeemer Presbyterian Church) and author (The Reason for God), pancreatic cancer.
- Winfield M. Kelly Jr., 87, American politician, secretary of state of Maryland (1987–1993).
- David Lambert, 89, British trade unionist, president of the National Union of Hosiery and Knitwear Workers (1982–1991).
- Ronald S. W. Lew, 81, American jurist, judge of the U.S. District Court for Central California (since 1987).
- Seán McCormack, 79, Irish Gaelic footballer (Meath).
- Véra Norman, 98, French actress (The Man from Jamaica, A Caprice of Darling Caroline, One Bullet Is Enough).
- Mirko Ramovš, 87, Slovenian ethnochoreologist.
- Bernhard Rohloff, 73, German bicycle engineer, founder of Rohloff, complications from Parkinson's disease.
- Andy Rourke, 59, English bassist (The Smiths), pancreatic cancer.
- Sir Derek Spencer, 87, British politician, solicitor general for England and Wales (1992–1997) and MP (1983–1987, 1992–1997).
- Ella Stack, 94, Australian politician, mayor (1975–1979) and lord mayor (1979–1980) of Darwin.
- Sergei Vorzhev, 73, Russian painter.

=== 20 ===
- Christian Aaron Boulogne, 60, French photographer, actor (The Inner Scar, The Secret Son, Nathalie...) and writer, drug overdose. (body discovered on this date)
- Mike Carey, 87, British sports presenter (BBC Radio Derby).
- Edna Child, 100, British Olympic diver (1948).
- Noel Clough, 86, Australian track and field athlete.
- Paul Desenne, 63, Venezuelan cellist and composer, heart attack.
- Marv Edwards, 88, Canadian ice hockey player (Pittsburgh Penguins, Toronto Maple Leafs).
- Tony Eggleton, 91, Australian political operative, federal director of the Liberal Party (1975–1990).
- Benjamin Harjo Jr., 77, American painter.
- Rick Hummel, 77, American sportswriter (St. Louis Post-Dispatch) and author.
- Seigo Kitamura, 76, Japanese politician, MP (since 2000).
- Györgyi Lang, 66, Hungarian actress and singer.
- John Loveday, 74, New Zealand rugby union player (Manawatu, national team).
- Terry McDermott, 82, American speed skater, Olympic champion (1964).
- Edmond J. Muniz, 83, American politician, founder of Krewe of Endymion and mayor of Kenner, Louisiana (2006–2010).
- Sven Nyhus, 90, Norwegian folk musician.
- Valentin Petit, 32, French filmmaker, plane crash.
- Jim Powell, 74, British novelist.
- Sante Ranucci, 89, Italian racing cyclist.
- Tom Sawyer, 77, American politician, member of the U.S. House of Representatives (1987–2003) and Ohio Senate (2007–2016), mayor of Akron (1984–1986).
- Brian Shul, 75, American Air Force major and aerial photographer.
- Doris Sikosana, 80–81, South African politician and anti-apartheid activist, MNA (2008–2009). (death announced on this date)
- Veno Taufer, 90, Slovenian poet, translator and playwright.
- Luis Walton, 73, Mexican politician, senator (2006–2012) and municipal president of Acapulco (2012–2015).
- Zohar Zisapel, 74, Israeli entrepreneur, co-founder of RAD Group, cancer.

=== 21 ===
- Alma Adamkienė, 96, Lithuanian philologist and philanthropist, first lady (1998–2003, 2004–2009), stroke.
- Ed Ames, 95, American singer ("My Cup Runneth Over", "Time, Time") and actor (Daniel Boone).
- Margaret Archer, 80, English sociologist.
- Antón Arrufat, 87, Cuban writer and poet, bronchopneumonia.
- C. Donald Bateman, 91, Canadian electrical engineer, inventor of the ground proximity warning system.
- David Brandt, 76, American farmer, traffic collision.
- Brad Crawford, 67, American football player.
- Chungkhokai Doungel, 82, Indian politician.
- Jonty Driver, 83, South African anti-apartheid activist.
- Sir Matthew Farrer, 93, British solicitor.
- C. Boyden Gray, 80, American lawyer and diplomat, White House counsel (1989–1993), ambassador to the EU (2006–2007) and special envoy for Eurasian energy (2008–2009), heart failure.
- Kathryn Jones Harrison, 99, American tribal leader.
- Jim Hubble, 80, Australian cricketer.
- Leon Ichaso, 74, Cuban-American film director (El Super, Sugar Hill, El Cantante), heart attack.
- David M. Jennings, 74, American politician, member (1979–1987) and speaker (1985–1987) of the Minnesota House of Representatives.
- Tze Leung Lai, 77, American statistician.
- George Logan, 78, British actor, composer and screenwriter (Dear Ladies).
- Donald Macleod, 82, Scottish theologian.
- Valentyna Maslovska, 86, Ukrainian Olympic sprinter (1960).
- Claude Noel, 74, Trinidadian boxer, WBA world lightweight champion (1981).
- Lew Palter, 94, American actor (First Monday in October, Titanic, The Flying Nun) and acting teacher, lung cancer.
- Victoriano Sánchez Arminio, 80, Spanish football referee.
- Sam Slom, 81, American politician, member of the Hawaii Senate (1997–2017).
- Thotakura Somaraju, 68, Indian film music composer (Hello Brother), singer-songwriter and record producer.
- Dougie Squires, 91, English choreographer.
- Ray Stevenson, 58, Northern Irish actor (Rome, Thor, Punisher: War Zone).
- Jason Twist, 55, English pool player.

=== 22 ===
- Sarath Babu, 71, Indian actor (Nizhal Nijamagiradhu, Seethakoka Chilaka, Neerajanam), multiple organ failure.
- George E. Bemi, 96, Canadian architect.
- Vágner Benazzi, 68, Brazilian football player and manager (São José, Portuguesa, Nacional).
- Carlos Borcosque Jr., 79, Argentine film director, screenwriter and producer (Santos Vega, Crucero de placer).
- Daniel Brooks, 64, Canadian theater director.
- Michael E. Dreher, 79, Swiss politician, MP (1987–1999).
- Patrick Edgeworth, 90, English screenwriter (BMX Bandits, Raw Deal, Ship to Shore).
- Antoni Flores Ardiaca, 60, Spanish engineer and politician, member of the Parliament of Catalonia (since 2021).
- Ildar Garifullin, 59, Russian Olympic Nordic combined skier (1984).
- Candace Introcaso, 69, American nun and academic administrator, president of La Roche University (since 2004).
- Ismail Kassim, 63, Malaysian politician, Perlis State MLA (2013–2022), MP (2008–2013) and senator (1999–2005), heart attack.
- Peggy Lee Leather, 64, American professional wrestler (WWF, NWA).
- Jeff Machado, 44, Brazilian journalist and actor, asphyxiated. (body discovered on this date)
- Ferus Mustafov, 72, Macedonian saxophonist.
- Chas Newby, 81, British bassist (The Beatles).
- Mosobalaje Oyawoye, 95, Nigerian geologist.
- George J. Pedersen, 87, American government contracting pioneer, co-founder of ManTech International.
- Erick Pohlhammer, 68, Chilean poet, complications from a stroke.
- Aditya Singh Rajput, 32, Indian actor (Cambala Investigation Agency).
- Kethu Viswanatha Reddy, 83, Indian writer.
- Elias Saba, 90, Lebanese politician and economist, minister of finance (1970–1972, 2004–2005) and defense (1970–1972).
- Wahid Satay, 93, Singaporean actor (Pontianak, Puteri Gunong Ledang, Pontianak Harum Sundal Malam), comedian and singer, complications from diabetes.
- Hugh Strachan, 84, Scottish footballer (Motherwell, Kilmarnock, Partick Thistle).
- Wim Udenhout, 85, Surinamese politician, prime minister (1984–1986).
- Vaibhavi Upadhyay, 38, Indian actress, traffic collision.
- John A. Walker, 84, British art critic and historian. (death announced on this date)
- Zheng Zhenyao, 86, Chinese actress (Sparkling Red Star, My Memories of Old Beijing, Shanghai Story).

=== 23 ===
- Javier Álvarez, 67, Mexican composer.
- Andrew Burke, 78–79, Australian poet.
- Magdy Conyd, 83, Egyptian-born Canadian Olympic fencer.
- Neil Dansie, 94, Australian cricketer (South Australia).
- Arno Dübel, 67, German unemployed person.
- John Dunning, 81, American author.
- Fusaichi Pegasus, 26, American Thoroughbred racehorse.
- Guan Xingya, 91, Chinese petroleum engineer, member of the Chinese Academy of Engineering.
- Jean Haudry, 88, French linguist.
- Redd Holt, 91, American jazz drummer (Ramsey Lewis Trio, Young-Holt Unlimited).
- Aida Khasanova, 39, Uzbek fencer and international fencing referee, complications from plastic surgery.
- Novak Kilibarda, 89, Montenegrin politician, professor and literary historian, deputy prime minister (1998–2000).
- Sergei Kulbach, 30, Ukrainian skater, suffocated.
- Jaromír Málek, 79, Czech Egyptologist.
- David Mitogo, 32, Equatorial Guinean footballer (national team). (body discovered on this date)
- Cotton Nash, 80, American basketball (Los Angeles Lakers, Kentucky Colonels) and baseball player (Chicago White Sox).
- Floyd Newman, 91, American saxophonist (The Mar-Keys, The Memphis Horns).
- Nitesh Pandey, 50, Indian actor (Om Shanti Om), heart attack.
- Sheldon Reynolds, 63, American guitarist (Sun, Commodores, Earth, Wind & Fire).
- Pedro N. Rivera, 76, Puerto Rican brigadier general.
- Radullan Sahiron, Filipino Islamic militant. (death announced on this date)
- Alojz Tkáč, 89, Slovak Roman Catholic prelate, bishop (1990–1995) and archbishop (1995–2010) of Košice.
- Robert Zimmer, 75, American mathematician and academic administrator, president of the University of Chicago (2006–2021), brain cancer.

=== 24 ===
- Emerson Allsworth, 96, American lawyer and politician, member of the Florida House of Representatives (1959–1966).
- Cotton Tree, c. 400, Sierra Leonean kapok tree, felled.
- Đặng Văn Thân, 90, Vietnamese politician.
- Hans-Peter Feldmann, 82, German visual artist.
- İlham Gencer, 97, Turkish pianist.
- David Grove, 87, American anthropologist and archaeologist.
- Jack Martin Händler, 75, Slovak conductor and violinist.
- Dano Heriban, 43, Slovak actor (The Man Who Stood in the Way), heart attack.
- Jerry Krause, 87, American Hall of Fame basketball coach (Gonzaga Bulldogs, Eastern Washington Eagles), colon cancer.
- Bill Lee, 94, American jazz musician and film composer (She's Gotta Have It, School Daze, Do the Right Thing).
- George Maharis, 94, American actor (Route 66, Exodus) and singer ("Teach Me Tonight"), hepatitis.
- Norbaiti Isran Noor, 54, Indonesian politician, MP (2014–2015), brain cancer.
- Clare Nowland, 95, Australian aged care resident, complications from Tasering.
- Peter Oliphant, 72, American video game designer (Stonekeep, Lexi-Cross) and actor (The Dick Van Dyke Show).
- Ergun Öztuna, 85, Turkish footballer (Fenerbahçe, Bursaspor, national team).
- Dennis L. Riley, 77, American politician, member of the New Jersey General Assembly (1980–1990).
- Adil Serdar Saçan, 60, Turkish police chief, lung cancer.
- Robert Shelley, 81, American politician, member of the Florida House of Representatives (1983–1990).
- Rolf Skår, 82, Norwegian computer engineer.
- Tina Turner, 83, American-born Swiss Hall of Fame singer ("River Deep – Mountain High", "What's Love Got to Do with It") and actress (Mad Max Beyond Thunderdome), eight-time Grammy winner.

=== 25 ===
- Robert William Bradford, 99, Canadian aviation artist.
- Glenn Farr, 77, American film editor (The Right Stuff, Commando, The Serpent and the Rainbow), Oscar winner (1984), brain tumor.
- Mac Gudgeon, 74, Australian screenwriter (The Delinquents, Wind, Last Ride).
- Riad Haidar, 71, Syrian-born Polish politician and physician, MP (since 2019).
- Frank Handlen, 106, American painter and sculptor.
- Jalna Hanmer, 91, British feminist.
- Ahmad Johar, 65, Kuwaiti actor, writer and television director.
- Ahmad Kamal, 85, Pakistani diplomat, permanent representative to the United Nations (1995–1999).
- Gary Kent, 89, American actor and stuntman (The Savage Seven, Psych-Out, Bubba Ho-Tep).
- Maciej Kujawski, 70, Polish actor (Na Wspólnej).
- Wolfgang Lakenmacher, 79, German Olympic handball player (1972).
- Karen Lumley, 59, British politician, MP (2010–2017).
- C. Steven McGann, 71, American diplomat.
- Joy McKean, 93, Australian country singer and songwriter ("Lights on the Hill", "The Biggest Disappointment"), cancer.
- Jens Jørn Mortensen, 96, Danish Olympic weightlifter (1952).
- Jean-Louis Murat, 71, French singer-songwriter.
- Ning Cai, 75, Chinese mathematician and electrical engineer.
- Alice Palmer, 83, American politician, member of the Illinois Senate (1991–1997).
- Denny Stolz, 89, American college football coach (Michigan State Spartans, Bowling Green Falcons, San Diego State Aztecs).

=== 26 ===
- Steven L. Berk, 74, American physician and writer.
- J. J. Bittenbinder, 80, American police officer and television host (Tough Target).
- Aaron Brink, 48, American mixed martial artist and pornographic actor (Spider-Man XXX: A Porn Parody).
- French Chang-Him, 85, Seychellois Anglican clergyman, bishop of Seychelles (1979–2004), archbishop of the Indian Ocean (1984–1995).
- Roberto Cicciomessere, 76, Italian politician, MEP (1984–1989).
- Kay B. Cobb, 81, American jurist and politician, justice of the Supreme Court of Mississippi (1999–2007) and member of the Mississippi State Senate (1992–1996).
- Andrew Evans, 87, Australian Assemblies of God pastor and politician, member of the South Australian Legislative Council (2002–2008).
- Flemensfirth, 31, American-born British Thoroughbred racehorse, Prix Lupin winner (1995).
- Pedro González Ramos, 88, Puerto Rican doctor and educator.
- Kathryn Harries, 72, British operatic soprano.
- Nils Henriksson, 94, Finnish Olympic cyclist (1952).
- László Hódi, 88, Hungarian-Australian Olympic basketball player (1952, 1964).
- Micky Jagtiani, 70, Indian businessman, founder of Landmark Group.
- Mohammad Jamal, 84, Lebanese singer, composer and actor.
- Kalanisi, 27, Irish Thoroughbred racehorse. (death announced on this date)
- Saul Kent, 83, American life extension activist, co-founder of Biomedical Research & Longevity Society.
- Samuel Kiplimo Kosgei, 37, Kenyan-born American long-distance runner, traffic collision.
- Sheldon Lavin, 89, American businessman.
- Jack Lee, 71, American songwriter ("Hanging on the Telephone", "Come Back and Stay") and musician (The Nerves), colon cancer.
- Lin Wenyue, 89, Taiwanese writer and translator.
- Meco, 83, American musician, arranger and producer ("Star Wars Theme/Cantina Band", Star Wars and Other Galactic Funk).
- Marilyn R. N. Mollicone, 94, American botanist.
- Emily Morgan, 45, British journalist (ITV News), lung cancer.
- Govindray H. Nayak, 89, Indian writer and professor.
- Hans Palmer, 89, American economist.
- Igor Vasilyev, 57, Russian handball player, Olympic champion (1992).
- K. Vasu, 72, Indian film director (Pranam Khareedu, Aarani Mantalu, Thodu Dongalu), screenwriter and producer.
- Lawrence Williams, 76, Welsh cricketer (Glamorgan).
- Reuben Wilson, 88, American jazz organist.

=== 27 ===
- Engin Ardıç, 71, Turkish journalist and columnist.
- Miroslav Belanský, 81, Slovak agronomist, minister of agriculture (1989–1990).
- Hans Bosse, 84, German anthropologist, sociologist, and social psychologist.
- Anita Cornwell, 99, American author and activist.
- Jayantha Dhanapala, 84, Sri Lankan diplomat, member of the constitutional council (2018–2020) and ambassador to the United States (1995–1997).
- Màrius Díaz, 89, Spanish politician, mayor of Badalona (1979–1983) and member of the Parliament of Catalonia (1984–1988).
- Uali Elamanov, 70, Kazakh military officer, commander of the Air Assault Forces (2001–2004).
- Lahouari Godih, 94, Algerian boxer and political activist.
- Jacqueline S. Ismael, 80, American-born Canadian political sociologist.
- Seemin Jamali, 61, Pakistani physician, colon cancer.
- Ilya Kabakov, 89, Russian-American conceptual artist.
- Graham Knuttel, 69, Irish painter and sculptor.
- Héctor Lacognata, 60, Paraguayan diplomat and politician, minister of foreign affairs (2009–2011).
- Jan Mrvík, 84, Czech rower, Olympic bronze medallist (1964).
- Odette Nilès, 100, French Resistance militant.
- Tyrone O'Sullivan, 77, Welsh trade unionist (NUM).
- Robin Page, 80, English journalist, politician and television presenter (One Man and His Dog), pancreatic cancer.
- Mordechai Rechtman, 97, German-born Israeli bassoonist (Israel Philharmonic Orchestra), conductor and teacher (Tel Aviv University).
- Claudia Rosett, 67, American journalist (The Wall Street Journal).
- Modesto Sandoval, 82, Paraguayan footballer (Sportivo Luqueño, Deportivo Galicia, Estudiantes).
- Giulia Tramontano, 29, Italian murder victim, stabbing.
- Stephen Waddams, 80, English-born Canadian legal scholar.
- James G. Watt, 85, American politician, secretary of the interior (1981–1983).
- Whisnu Sakti Buana, 48, Indonesian politician, mayor of Surabaya (2021), heart attack.

=== 28 ===
- Kjell Aartun, 97, Norwegian theologian and linguist.
- Frédéric Barbier, 70, French historian.
- Isa Barzizza, 93, Italian actress (The Two Orphans, Bluebeard's Six Wives, It's Never Too Late).
- Ernest Bertrand Boland, 97, American Roman Catholic prelate, bishop of Multan (1966–1984).
- Sir David Brewer, 83, British businessman and politician, lord mayor of London (2005–2006), lord-lieutenant of Greater London (2008–2015).
- George Cassidy, 86, Northern Irish jazz musician and music teacher.
- Choi Il-nam, 90, South Korean writer.
- Carlos Alberto Prates Correia, 81, Brazilian film director, producer and screenwriter (Castelar e Nelson Dantas no País dos Generais).
- Jean-Claude Cros, 80, French rugby league footballer (national team).
- Alexander W. Dreyfoos Jr., 91, American businessman and philanthropist.
- Antonio Gala, 92, Spanish poet, playwright and writer.
- Owen Gingerich, 93, American astronomer.
- Mike de la Hoz, 84, Cuban baseball player (Cleveland Indians, Atlanta Braves).
- Matti Kilpiö, 83, Finnish philologist.
- Kim Seok-hun, 93, South Korean actor (Farewell to the Duman River, The Genealogy, General's Son).
- Milt Larsen, 92, American actor and magician, creator of the Magic Castle.
- Hein Schreuder, 71, Dutch economist and business executive (DSM).
- Sergey Sirotkin, 71, Russian politician, MP (2003–2008, 2011–2016).
- Mele Siuʻilikutapu, 75, Tongan royal and politician, first female MP (1975–1978).
- Alan Smith, 74, English physiotherapist.
- Karim Tizouiar, 60, Algerian Kabyle singer.
- Mike Young, 63, American baseball player (Baltimore Orioles), heart attack.
- Piet de Zoete, 79, Dutch footballer (ADO Den Haag, national team).
- Harald zur Hausen, 87, German virologist, Nobel Prize laureate (2008).

=== 29 ===
- Thomas Buergenthal, 89, Czechoslovak-born American international lawyer and law school dean, judge of the International Court of Justice (2000–2010).
- Shaw Clifton, 77, Irish minister, general of the Salvation Army (2006–2011).
- Carroll Cooley, 87, American police detective.
- Michel Côté, 72, Canadian actor (Cruising Bar, Life After Love, C.R.A.Z.Y.), bone marrow disease.
- Raymond Dokpesi, 71, Nigerian media executive, founder of AIT, stroke.
- Victor Galeone, 87, American Roman Catholic prelate, bishop of St. Augustine (2001–2011).
- Pierre Gaudot, 95, French racing cyclist.
- Asad Gulzoda, 88, Tajik poet and linguist.
- Claes Insulander, 78, Swedish sailor and organist.
- Vítězslav Mácha, 75, Czech wrestler, Olympic champion (1972).
- Mirosława Masłowska, 79, Polish politician, MP (2005–2007).
- Bernadette Menu, 85, French Egyptologist.
- William O'Neil, 90, American businessman, stockbroker and writer.
- Teppo Rastio, 89, Finnish ice hockey (Lukko, Ilves) and football (national team) player.
- Peter Simonischek, 76, Austrian actor (Love and Fear, Toni Erdmann, Kursk).
- Tove Skutnabb-Kangas, 82, Finnish linguist.
- Etela Studeníková, 77, Slovak archaeologist.
- Jacob Turkel, 88, Israeli jurist, justice of the Supreme Court (1995–2005).
- Robin Wagner, 89, American set designer (The Producers, Jesus Christ Superstar, City of Angels), Tony winner (1978, 1990, 2001).
- Javier Yacuzzi, 43, Argentine footballer (Tigre, Arsenal de Sarandí, Club Tijuana), virus.

=== 30 ===
- John Beasley, 79, American actor (Rudy, Everwood, The General's Daughter).
- Don Bonker, 86, American politician, member of the U.S. House of Representatives (1975–1989), gallbladder cancer.
- Peggy Brock, 75, Australian historian.
- Suresh Dhanorkar, 47, Indian politician, MP (since 2019) and Maharashtra MP (2014–2019), complications from kidney stones.
- Gershon Edelstein, 100, Soviet-born Israeli rabbi.
- Karl-Heinz Ferschl, 78, German footballer (1. FC Nürnberg, Hertha BSC).
- Fiorente, 15, Irish-bred Australian Thoroughbred racehorse, winner of the Melbourne Cup (2013) and Australian Cup (2014).
- Joe Gaines, 86, American baseball player (Cincinnati Reds, Baltimore Orioles, Houston Astros).
- Peter Harbison, 84, Irish archaeologist.
- Mike Hoban, 71, American football player (Chicago Bears).
- Jessie Maple, 76, American cinematographer and film director (Will, Twice as Nice).
- Lou Marcon, 88, Canadian ice hockey player (Detroit Red Wings, Edmonton Flyers, Pittsburgh Hornets).
- Bill McGovern, 60, American football coach (Boston College Eagles, New York Giants, UCLA Bruins), cancer.
- Eusebius McKaiser, 45, South African political analyst and journalist (Mail & Guardian, Sunday Times).
- Nice Nature, 35, Japanese Thoroughbred racehorse, Takamatsunomiya Kinen winner (1994).
- Raisa O'Farrill Bolanos, 51, Cuban volleyball player, Olympic champion (1992, 1996), cancer.
- Mina Pandey, 71, Nepali politician, MP (1991–1999, since 2018).
- Harvey Pitt, 78, American lawyer, chairman of the Securities and Exchange Commission (2001–2003).
- Paolo Portoghesi, 91, Italian architect (Mosque of Rome).
- Peter Pouncey, 85, British-American author and classicist, president of Amherst College (1984–1994).
- Rite Of Passage, 19, British Thoroughbred racehorse. (death announced on this date)
- Gurdial Singh, 99, Indian mountaineer, complications from a broken hip.
- Michael Viney, 90, British-born Irish journalist (The Irish Times).
- Wan Zhexian, 95, Chinese mathematician, member of the Chinese Academy of Sciences.
- Milka Zimková, 71, Slovak actress and screenwriter (She Grazed Horses on Concrete).

=== 31 ===
- Agnes Abuom, 73, Kenyan Anglican theologian.
- Ama Ata Aidoo, 81, Ghanaian author, playwright (The Dilemma of a Ghost, Anowa), and politician, minister of education (1982–1983).
- Vellayani Arjunan, 90, Indian literary scholar.
- Andrew Bellucci, 59, American pizza chef, heart attack.
- Lewis M. Branscomb, 96, American physicist, director of the National Institute of Standards (1969–1972).
- Donald D. Brown, 91, American professor and developmental biologist.
- Sergio Calderón, 77, Mexican-born American actor (Pirates of the Caribbean: At World's End, Men in Black, The Ruins).
- Brian Chisholm, 85, Australian footballer (South Melbourne).
- Harry R. Clements, 94, American engineer and businessman.
- Edward Czernik, 82, Polish Olympic high jumper (1964).
- Patricia Dainton, 93, British actress (Dancing with Crime, The Passionate Stranger, Sixpenny Corner).
- Luca Di Fulvio, 66, Italian writer, actor and playwright, amyotrophic lateral sclerosis.
- Amitai Etzioni, 94, Israeli-American sociologist.
- Ramon Farolan, 88, Philippine general, commanding general of the Philippine Air Force (1988).
- Ved Kumari Ghai, 91, Indian Sanskrit scholar.
- Peter K. Machamer, 80, American philosopher and historian.
- Theodoros Pangalos, 84, Greek politician, deputy prime minister (2009–2012) and minister of foreign affairs (1996–1999).
- Vera Putina, 96, Georgian woman, claimed to be the mother of Vladimir Putin. (death announced on this date)
- Gene Rogers, 93, American politician, member of the North Carolina House of Representatives (1987–2003).
- Katakam Sudarshan, Indian communist militant, heart attack.
- Gabi Tolkowsky, 84, Belgian diamond cutter.
- Kurt Widmer, 82, Swiss baritone and voice teacher (City of Basel Music Academy).
- Stanley Wojcicki, 86, Polish-American physicist, heart failure.
- Viktor Zubarev, 62, Russian politician, MP (since 2007).
