= David Embury =

David Embury may refer to:

- David A. Embury (1886–1960), American lawyer and author of The Fine Art of Mixing Drinks (1948)
- J. David Embury, Canadian scientist and engineer
