= Senator Heath =

Senator Heath may refer to:

- Bill Heath (politician) (born 1959), Georgia State Senate
- Charles H. Heath (1829–1889), Vermont State Senate
- Roger C. Heath (1943–2023), New Hampshire State Senate
- Rollie Heath (born 1937), Colorado State Senate
- William Heath (1737–1814), Massachusetts State Senate
