= Tommy Hayes =

Tommy Hayes may refer to:

- Tommy Hayes (rugby union, born 1973), Cook Island international rugby union player
- Tommy Hayes (rugby union, born 1980), Irish rugby union player
- Tommy Hayes, better known as LustSickPuppy (born 1997), American rapper

== See also ==
- Tommy Hays (born 1929), guitarist, band leader and vocalist
