= Ulrich F. Kocks =

American physicist and materials scientist

Ulrich Fred Kocks known as Fred Kocks, (25 November 1929 – 6 May 2023) was an American physicist and materials scientist.

Kocks was elected a member of the US National Academy of Engineering in 1999 for advancements in the theory of strength, kinetics of plasticity of metals, and texture analysis. Kocks died on 6 May 2023, at the age of 94.

== Early Biography ==
Kocks was born in Germany as Ulrich Fritz Heinrich Kocks in 1929 and graduated from the Department of Theoretical Physics at the University of Göttingen, Germany, in 1954 under Richard Becker. He then emigrated to the U.S. and did graduate studies at Harvard University under the guidance of Bruce Chalmers and earned a Ph.D. in applied physics in 1959. One of his first publications in 1958 on "Polyslip in polycrystals" documents his interest in deformation of materials that remained the focus during his later career.

== Academic work ==
After graduation Fred Kocks joined the faculty at Harvard in the Division of Engineering and Applied Physics until 1965, during which time he took a sabbatical leave at the Technical University of Munich that resulted in publication of his seminal paper on “Statistical Theory of Flow Stress and Work Hardening" in the Philosophical Magazine. With Bruce Chalmers he investigated slip in copper crystals. In 1965 he was invited by Argonne National Laboratory to form a Group for Mechanical Properties where he continued to pursue his interest in the relationship between single crystal behavior and polycrystalline response and had an opportunity to meet researchers from all over the world and start collaborations that lasted for a long time, for example John Jonas from McGill University in Montreal, Canada, e.g., David Embury from McMaster University in Canada e.g., Ali Argon from [MIT] and Michael F. Ashby, then at Harvard and later at Cambridge University. At Argonne Fred Kocks concentrated on solid-solution alloys and dynamic strain aging in particular with major publications on "The relation between polycrystal deformation and single-crystal deformation", “Thermodynamics and kinetics of slip” (1975), "The development of strain-rate gradients" and, “The Kinetics of Non-Uniform Deformation” (1981). After organizing the Gordon Conference in Physical Metallurgy in 1977, he turned to high-temperature deformation and the phenomenon of creep in metals. During his time at Argonne he took several leaves as invited guest professor. Important was a visit to University of Aachen in 1971/1972 with one of the most important materials science departments in Germany under the direction of Professor Kurt Lücke and a junior faculty Heiner Mecking who later directed the Technical University Hamburg-Harburg. There are many publications between Kocks and Mecking, with a first one in 1979 on "The development of strain-rate gradients" and a recent one reviewing the “Physics and Phenomenology of Strain Hardening” (2003). In 1979 Fred Kocks was awarded a Humboldt Fellowship from the German Humboldt Foundation and returned to Aachen. Other invited professorships were to McMaster University in Hamilton in 1978 and McGill University in Montreal in 1982. At McGill he did meet Gilles Canova and Carlos Tomé with whom he established also long-lasting relationships.

In 1983, Kocks moved to Los Alamos National Laboratory and became a founding member of its Center for Materials Science. He concentrated on research on metal plasticity and crystallographic preferred orientation (“texture” in metals, “fabric” in rocks) rather than on administration, maintaining existing collaborations and creating new ones, for example in a 1984 workshop with new faces such as Paul R. Dawson |url=https://www.mae.cornell.edu/faculty-directory/paul-dawson| from the Sibley School of Mechanical and Aerospace Engineering at Cornell University, focusing on finite element methods, Anthony Rollett, known as Tony Rollett, at the time graduate student at Los Alamos and now Professor at Carnegie Mellon University which resulted in the development of the freely distributed software “preferred orientation package Los Alamos (popLA)” in collaboration with John Kallend and Hans-Rudolf Wenk, known as Rudy, at UC Berkeley, a geologist and an expert on texture in rocks (and also a Humboldt Fellow) trying to understand the complexities of 3D orientation distributions. This workshop in Los Alamos was followed up with the 8th International Conference on Textures of Materials (ICOTOM) in Santa Fe, organized by Fred Kocks in Fall 1987, attracting a large audience and focusing on modeling of texture development, quantitative texture measurements and experiments on complex polyphase materials, including rocks. Rocks have become fascinating also for materials science, in part because they are composed of crystals with low symmetry. While much of texture research has focused on fcc and bcc metals, hexagonal metals (such as zirconium and hafnium) as well as monoclinic uranium and transition elements used in semiconductors have attracted interest and lead to a generalization of texture software, both in terms of pole figure analysis and plasticity simulation. This initiative was promoted by Fred Kocks and his colleagues. Based on a better understanding of crystal orientation distributions in deformed materials and new methods to measure them quantitatively Fred Kocks advanced the freely distributed software “Los Alamos polycrystal plasticity (LApp)” in collaboration with Gilles Canova. This approach to polyphase polycrystal plasticity has later been expanded by collaborators at Los Alamos, Carlos Tomé and Ricardo Lebensohn, into the Viscoplastic Self-Consistent method (VPSC). In terms of impact Fred Kocks reached a climax in 1998 with the publication of a comprehensive 676-page book "Texture and Anisotropy. Preferred Orientations in Polycrystals and Their Effect on Materials Properties" by Cambridge University Press and a second edition in 2000, co-authored with Carlos Tomé and Rudy Wenk and several other contributors.

== Honors ==
Honors include the Humboldt Award of the Alexander von Humboldt Foundation of Germany in 1979; Doctor of Technology honoris causa from Tampere University of Technology, Finland, in 1982; Senior Scientist Award from the Japan Society for the Promotion of Science in 1985; Fellow of TMS in 1987; Fellow of American Society for Metals in 1993 and election to the National Academy of Engineering in 1999. He retired from Los Alamos in 1999 and is now Distinguished Professor Affiliate in the Department of Mechanical and Aeronautical Engineering, Jacobs School of Engineering, at the University of California San Diego.
