= Emerson Allsworth =

American politician (1926–2023)

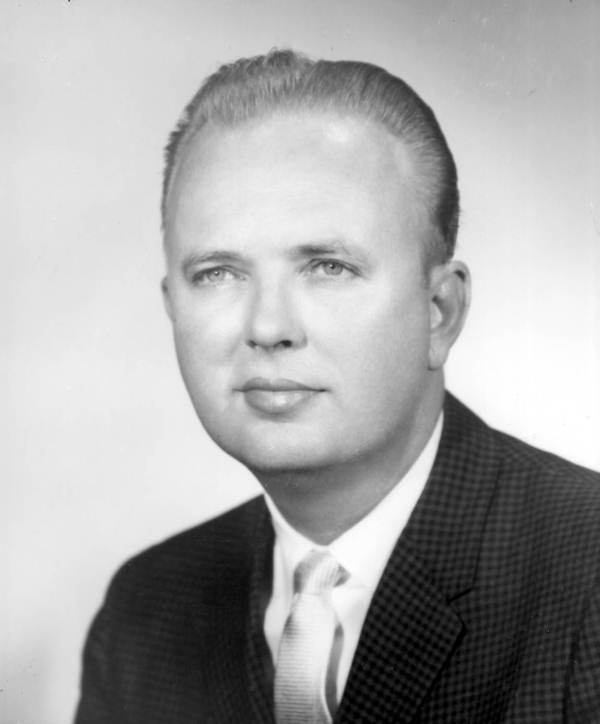
- Official portrait, 1959

Member of the Florida House of Representatives from the Broward County district
- In office 1959–1966

Personal details
- Born: Emerson Lincoln Allsworth; August 24, 1926 Miami, Florida, U.S.
- Died: May 24, 2023 (aged 96) Pompano Beach, Florida, U.S.
- Party: Democratic
- Education: Miami University, University of Miami
- Occupation: Attorney

Emerson Lincoln Allsworth (August 24, 1926 – May 24, 2023) was an American politician and lawyer in the state of Florida. He served in the Florida House of Representatives from 1959 to 1966, representing Broward County.

Allsworth died in Pompano Beach, Florida, on May 24, 2023, at the age of 96.
