= Jacqueline S. Ismael =

American sociologist

- Born: Jacqueline Sidonia Nemitz; September 27, 1942; Chicago, Illinois, U.S.
- Died: May 27, 2023 (age 80)
- Occupation(s): Sociologist, social worker

Jacqueline Sidonia Nemitz Ismael (September 27, 1942 – May 27, 2023) was an American-born Canadian political sociologist on the faculty of the University of Calgary from 1980 to 2019.

== Early life and education ==
Nemitz was born in Chicago, the daughter of Russell P. Nemitz and Lena Mannella Nemitz. She earned a bachelor's degree and a master's degree at the University of Calgary, and completed doctoral studies in sociology from the University of Alberta.

== Career ==
Ismael was a member of the social welfare faculty of the University of Calgary from 1980 to 2019. She established and headed the department's international social work concentration. She also held an adjunct appointment in international relations at Eastern Mediterranean University. She served on the advisory board of Arab Studies Quarterly. In 2003 and 2004, she was part of a movement to create an International University of Baghdad.

== Publications ==
Ismael's work appeared in academic journals including The Middle East Journal, Arab Studies Quarterly, Social Problems, Politics and the Life Sciences, and International Journal of Contemporary Iraqi Studies.

=== Books ===
- Canadian Social Welfare Policy: Federal and Provincial Dimensions (1985, editor)
- The Contemporary Study of the Arab World (1991, co-editor, with Earl L. Sullivan)
- Kuwait: Dependency and Class in a Rentier State (1994)
- Social Policy in the Arab World (1995, with Tareq Y. Ismael)
- Government and Politics in the Contemporary Middle East: Continuity and Change (2010, with Tareq Y. Ismael)
- Iraq in the Twenty-First Century: Regime Change and the Making of a Failed State (2015, with Tareq Y. Ismael)
- Government and Politics: Discontinuity and Turbulence (2023)
- The Unending War in Iraq: Pax Americana (2024, with Tareq Y. Ismael and Leslie T. MacDonald; published posthumously)

=== Articles ===
- "The Arab Americans and The Middle East" (1976, with Tareq Y. Ismael)
- "Dependency and Capital Surplus: The Case of Kuwait" (1979)
- "Social Policy and Social Change: The Case of Iraq" (1980)
- "Social Change in Islamic Society: The Political Thought of Ayatollah Khomeini" (1980, with Tareq Y. Ismael)
- "The Alienation of Palestine in Palestinian Poetry" (1981)
- "Civil Society in the Arab World: Historical Traces, Contemporary Vestiges" (1997, with Tareq Y. Ismael)
- "Globalization and the Arab World in Middle East Politics: Regional Dynamics in Historical Perspective" (1999, with Tareq Y. Ismael)
- "Iraqi women under occupation: from tribalism to neo-feudalism" (2007, with Shereen T. Ismael)
- "Whither Iraq? Beyond Saddam, sanctions and occupation" (2007, with Tareq Y. Ismael)
- "Social Policy in the Arab World: The Search for Social Justice" (2008, with Shereen T. Ismael)
- "Living through war, sanctions, and occupation: The voices of Iraqi women (2009, with Shereen T. Ismael)
- "The sectarian state in Iraq and the new political class" (2010, with Tareq Y. Ismael)
- "The Arab Spring and the Uncivil State" (2013, with Shereen T. Ismael)
- "Children of the occupation: A decade after the invasion" (2013, with Shereen T. Ismael)
- "Iraqi Women in Conditions of War and Occupation" (2014)
- "The Social Contract and the Iraqi State" (2015, with Tareq Y. Ismael)
- "Cowboy Warfare, Biological Diplomacy: Disarming Metaphors as Weapons of Mass Destruction" (2016, with Tareq Y. Ismael)

== Personal life ==
Nemitz married Tareq Y. Ismael, an Iraqi-born political science professor at the University of Calgary. They had two daughters, Shereen and Jenann. She died in 2023, at the age of 80. Flags were lowered on the campus of the University of Calgary to mark her death.
