= Patricia Morgan-Webb =

British educator and academic (1943 – 2023)

Dame Patricia Morgan-Webb, DBE (18 May 1943 – 16 May 2023) was a British educator and academic. She was the head of Clarendon College (1991–1998), and New College (1998–2003), both in Nottingham.

New College, Nottingham was established by merging four smaller colleges. The school achieved two successful national inspections, in 1996 and 2001 respectively, under Morgan-Webb's leadership. The college was awarded, among other awards, the Queen's Anniversary Award for FHE in 2002.

Morgan-Webb served as a member of the UK Qualifications and Curriculum Authority for five years (1997–2002). She was a board member of the East Midlands Regional Economic Development Agency (1998–2004) and the Derbyshire Learning and Skills Council.

== Later life and death ==
After retiring from New College in December 2003, she established an educational consulting firm known as The Morgan Webb Education Ltd.

Morgan-Webb was a governor of Walsall College and a trustee at Citizens Advice South East Staffordshire.

Dame Patricia Morgan-Webb died on 16 May 2023, two days shy of her 80th birthday.

== Honours and awards ==
Morgan-Webb was awarded a damehood for "services to Further Education" in the 2000 Honours List.

Morgan-Webb was Special Professor at the University of Nottingham and was awarded an Honorary Doctorate at the Nottingham Trent University in 2004
