= Colette Nucci =

French actress and theater director

- Born: 16 April 1950; Marseille, France
- Died: 10 May 2023 (aged 73); Bougival, France
- Education: Conservatoire national supérieur d'art dramatique, 1974
- Occupations: Actress, theater director

Colette Nucci (16 April 1950 – 10 May 2023) was a French actress and theatre director. Under her management Parisian theatre Théâtre 13 expanded to a second stage.

== Biography ==
Born in Marseille, Nucci spent part of her youth in Algeria before starting theater classes at Le Mans in 1963.

=== Acting career ===
From 1971 to 1974 she studied at the Conservatoire national supérieur d'art dramatique in Paris, under the supervision of Louis Seigner. In 1972, she performed in La Station Champaudet at the Comédie-Française, which was recorded as a television film on France 3, as well as featuring in two plays staged at the Théâtre des Célestins in Lyon.

After graduating, Nucci moved to moved to Madrid (in 1976), and married Spanish musician and painter José Luís Peñamaria. In 1984, Nucci returned to France and founded a drama school in Bougival, near Paris.

Starting in 1990, Nucci appeared in multiple voice acting roles for French television, most notably in Murphy Brown and ER.

She had a leading role in 1998 French film Les soeurs Hamlet by Abdelkrim Bahloul, also featuring Bérénice Bejo, Gad Elmaleh and Gilles Lellouche.

=== Theater direction ===
In September 1999 Nucci took the direction of Théâtre 13, a theater in the 13th arrondissement of Paris. Under her leadership, Théâtre 13 was noted for having "always supported young artists, burgeoning troupes" and "became a nursery where many talents have grown". The theater also received critical praise after hosting Alexis Michalik's Le Porteur d'Histoire, which received two Molière Awards in 2014.

In 2011, Théâtre 13 opened a second stage, and in 2017 the first stage was refurbished.

In 2021 she was replaced as director by Lucas Bonnifait.

Colette Nucci died of cancer on May 10, 2023.

== On screen and stage ==
=== Theater ===
- 1970: L'Automus by Camillo Baciu, directed by Camillo Baciu
- 1972: La Station Champbaudet by Eugène Marin Labiche, directed by Jean-Laurent Cochet, played at the Comédie-Française in Paris, filmed by Georges Folgoas
- 1973: Le Jeu de l'amour et du hasard (The Game of Love and Chance) by Pierre de Marivaux, directed by Jean Meyer, played at the Théâtre des Célestins in Lyon
- 1973: On purge bébé by Georges Feydeau, directed by Jean Meyer, played at the Théâtre des Célestins in Lyon
- 1974: Le Dindon by Georges Feydeau, played at the Conservatoire national supérieur d'art dramatique
- 1986: Les Fausses Confidences by Pierre de Marivaux
- 1997: Le Paradis sur terre (The Seven Descents of Myrtle) by Tennessee Williams
- 1999: La Mère confidente by Pierre de Marivaux, directed by Delphine Lequenne
- 2001: Treize mains by Carol Shields, directed by Rachel Salik

=== Film ===
- 1998: Les soeurs Hamlet directed by Abdelkrim Bahloul

=== Voice acting ===
==== Television ====
- 1990-1996: Murphy Brown as Doris Dial, for Janet Carroll
- 1993-1994: Melrose Place as Lauren Ethridge, for Kristian Alfonso
- 1994: ER (TV series) as Dr Sarah Langworthy, for Tyra Ferrell
- 1995-2009: ER (TV series) as Nurse Chuny Marquez, for Laura Cerón
- 1996-1997: NYPD Blue as Geri Turner, for Debra Christofferson
- 1997-2000: Spin City as Claudia Sacks-Lassiter, for Faith Prince
- 2017: Unforgotten as Inspector Tessa Dixon, for Lorraine Ashbourne

==== Film ====
- 2014: August: Osage County as Mattie Fae Aiken, for Margo Martindale
