= Jerome B. Lammers =

American politician

Member of the South Dakota House of Representatives for the 10th district
- In office 1977–1992

Speaker of the South Dakota House of Representatives
- In office 1983–1984

Personal details
- Born: May 29, 1937 Madison, South Dakota
- Died: May 9, 2023 (aged 85)
- Party: Republican
- Spouse: Nancy Lee Jones
- Children: two
- Profession: lawyer

Jerome Bryce Lammers (May 29, 1937 – May 9, 2023) was an American politician in the state of South Dakota. He was a member of the South Dakota House of Representatives from 1977 to 1992. Lammers attended the University of South Dakota where he earned Bachelor of Arts and Juris Doctor degrees. He was County Attorney for Lake County from 1964 to 1968, and practiced law in the partnership Lammers, Kleibacker and Casey.

Lammers was Speaker Pro tempore of the House from 1981 to 1982, Speaker of the House from 1983 to 1984, Majority Whip in 1986, and Majority Leader from 1987 to 1992.
