= Eugeniusz Matyjas =

Polish politician (1952–2023)

Voivode of Leszno Voivodeship
- In office 1990–1994
- Preceded by: Józef Poniecki
- Succeeded by: Zbigniew Haupt

Personal details
- Born: Eugeniusz Stanisław Matyjas; 3 May 1952 Kłodzko, Poland
- Died: 6 May 2023 (aged 71)
- Education: University of Wrocław

Eugeniusz Stanisław Matyjas (3 May 1952 – 6 May 2023) was a Polish politician. He served as voivode of Leszno Voivodeship from 1990 to 1994.

Matyjas died on 6 May 2023, at the age of 71.
