= Sun Jiulin =

Chinese engineer (1937–2023)

- 孙九林
- Born: 10 August 1937; Shanghai, China
- Died: 10 May 2023 (aged 85); Beijing, China
- Education: Xi'an Jiaotong University
- Scientific career
- Fields: Resource science
- Workplaces: Institute of Geographic Sciences and Natural Resources Research, CAS

Chinese name
- Simplified Chinese: 孙九林
- Traditional Chinese: 孫九林
Transcriptions
Standard Mandarin
- Hanyu Pinyin: Sūn Jiǔlín

Sun Jiulin (Chinese: 孙九林; 10 August 1937 – 10 May 2023) was a Chinese engineer specializing in resource science, and an academician of the Chinese Academy of Engineering.

== Biography ==
Sun was born in Songjiang County, Shanghai, on 10 August 1937, while his ancestral home is in Yancheng, Jiangsu. In 1959, he entered Xi'an Jiaotong University, where he majored in power system automation.

After graduating in 1964, he was despatched to the Comprehensive Investigation Committee of the Chinese Academy of Sciences. During the Cultural Revolution, he was forced to work in the fields of May Seventh Cadre Schools and returned to the Institute of Geography, Chinese Academy of Sciences in 1972. He was promoted to associate research fellow of the Land and Resources Information Research Office of Comprehensive Examination Association of the Chinese Academy of Sciences in March 1978. In January 1991 he was promoted again to become research fellow. In March 1992, he was appointed deputy director of Agricultural Research Center of National Agricultural Zoning Commission of the Chinese Academy of Sciences, a post he kept until August 1997. Following the merging of the Natural Resources Comprehensive Investigation Committee and the Institute of Geography into a new Institute of Geographic Sciences and Natural Resources Research in September 1999, he was also transferred to the newly workplace. In May 2002, he was recruited as a professor of Henan University.

On 10 May 2023, he died of an illness in Beijing, aged 85.

== Contributions ==
Sun presided over the construction of China's first land and resources database, filling the domestic gap. He took the lead in building a multi variety and large-scale remote sensing production estimation practical system that breaks through multiple key technologies, making pioneering contributions to China's remote sensing production estimation. He also took the lead in hosting and implementing the National Science Data Sharing Project, established the National Earth Systems Science Data Sharing Platform, and promoted the open sharing of scientific data in China.

== Honours and awards ==
- 2001 Member of the Chinese Academy of Engineering (CAE)
- 2014 State Science and Technology Progress Award (Second Class) for the construction, key technologies and application services of the national platform for data sharing in earth systems science
