= Marc Jeuniau =

Belgian sports journalist (1927–2023)

- Born: 26 June 1927; Ixelles, Belgium
- Died: 5 May 2023 (aged 95); Woluwe-Saint-Lambert, Belgium
- Occupation: Journalist

Marc Jeuniau (26 June 1927 – 5 May 2023) was a Belgian sports journalist.

Jeuniau began his career in the written press before becoming one of the pioneers of Belgian live sports reporting on television with the National Institute for Radio Broadcast (INR) and later Radiodiffusion-télévision belge, émissions françaises (RTB).

== Biography ==
Born in Ixelles on 26 June 1927, Jeuniau began his career as a journalist with Le Peuple in 1947. The following year, he covered the Tour de France. In September 1947, he joined the writing team of the weekly Sport-Club while continuing to write for Le Peuple. At the start of the 1950s, he covered Raymond Impanis as a rising talent in cycling and often covered him in his articles.

After Sport-Club ceased its activities, Jeuniau joined the INR in September 1954. In October 1956, he created the program Lundi Sports, which remained on air for a quarter of a century. In April 1957, he made the first-ever live sports report on Belgian television, covering the Paris–Brussels. In 1960, the INR became the RTB. In 1962, he was promoted as head of sporting news for the RTB.

In addition to his career on Belgian television, Jeuniau also collaborated with the French sporting magazine Miroir Sprint in 1956 and was chief Belgian journalist for Miroir du cyclisme from 1961 until the 1980s. His first article written in the French press covered Rik Van Looy. In 1967, he wrote his first book, titled Le cyclisme (de Coppi à Van Looy et à Anquetil). He later wrote numerous books about Eddy Merckx.

Marc Jeuniau died in Woluwe-Saint-Lambert on 5 May 2023, at the age of 95.

== Bibliography ==
- Virus du football (1967, with Norberto Hofling)
- Le cyclisme (de Coppi à Van Looy et à Anquetil) (1967)
- Qui êtes-vous Eddy Merckx ? (1969)
- Face à face avec Eddy Merckx (1971)
- Mes carnets de route 1971 (1971)
- Plus d'un tour dans mon sac, mes carnets de route 1972 (1972)
- Ma chasse aux maillots : Rose, jaune, arc-en-ciel, mes carnets de route 1974 (1974)
- Eddy Merckx - L'homme du défi (1977)
- Les 400 coups de Maertens - La saison cycliste 1981 (1982)
- Où se cache le nouveau Merckx ? (1982)
