= Hans Palmer =

American economist (1933–2023)

Hans Palmer

Hans C. Palmer (1933–2023) was an American economist. He was the Stedman-Sumner Professor of Economics and W.M. Keck Distinguished Service Professor at Pomona College in Claremont, California, where he taught from 1962 to 2008. He was also vice president and dean of the college for three years from 1998 to 2001, and was the president of the college's Pacific Basin Institute.
