= Carl Reissigl =

Austrian politician (1925–2023)

President of the Landtag of Tyrol
- In office 1989–1994
- Preceded by: Josef Thoman
- Succeeded by: Helmut Mader

Personal details
- Born: 14 January 1925 Innsbruck, Austria
- Died: 3 May 2023 (aged 98)
- Party: TVP
- Education: University of Innsbruck

Carl Reissigl (14 January 1925 – 3 May 2023) was an Austrian politician. A member of the Tiroler Volkspartei, he served as president of the Landtag of Tyrol from 1989 to 1994.

Reissigl died on 3 May 2023, at the age of 98.
