= Odette Nilès =

French militant (1922–2023)

- Born: Odette Lecland; 27 December 1922; Paris, France
- Died: 27 May 2023 (aged 100)
- Political party: French Communist Party
- Movement: French Resistance
- Spouse: Maurice Nilès
- Honours: Legion of Honour

Odette Nilès (née Lecland; 27 December 1922 – 27 May 2023) was a French Communist and a militant in the French Resistance. She was held in internment camps from 1941 to 1944, where she had a romance with resistance hero Guy Môquet, for which she became known as "Guy Môquet's fiancée". After escaping from an internment camp, she became a member of the resistance against Vichy France. After World War II, she remained an active member of the French Communist Party as the wife of the mayor of Drancy.

== Biography ==
Odette Lecland was born in Paris on 27 December 1922, and she grew up in Drancy. She became engaged in activism and volunteer work in 1939, when she was 15 years old, opposing French involvement in the Spanish Civil War and collecting donations of milk for babies in Spain. She joined the Young Communists in 1940. During the occupation period of Vichy France, she worked with them to distribute pamphlets and attend protests. She was arrested along with a group of fellow militants on 13 August 1941, and she was sent to the Choisel internment camp the next month. Lecland met prominent resistance fighter Guy Môquet while she was interned, and she briefly began a romance with him. After his execution, she came to be known as "Guy Môquet's fiancée". She remained in various camps for the following three years. She escaped from the Merignac internment camp in 1944 and joined the French Resistance in Bordeaux. While in the resistance, she met Maurice Nilés, whom she married. They had a son, Claude Guy Nilés, named for Guy Môquet. For her work with the resistance, she received the Legion of Honour.

Odette Nilès continued supporting communism after the end of World War II, and she was a lifelong member of the French Communist Party. She also became involved in the feminist movement. From 1959 to 1997, her husband was the mayor of Drancy. Nilès wrote a book about her relationship with Môquet in 2008. A graphic novel about her life was written by Gwenaëlle Abolivier and illustrated by Eddy Vaccaro in 2021. Nilès died on 27 May 2023. Condolences were sent by prominent figures including President Emmanuel Macron and Communist Party leader Fabien Roussel.
