= Jalna Hanmer =

British feminist academic (1931–2023)

- Born: 29 May 1931; Walla Walla, Washington, U.S.
- Died: 25 May 2023 (aged 91); Spain
- Education: University of California, Berkeley
- Occupations: Feminist scholar and writer
- Employer(s): University of Bradford; Leeds Beckett University

Jalna Alyce Alderman Hanmer (29 May 1931 – 25 May 2023) was a British feminist, campaigner on domestic violence, an academic and writer.

== Biography ==
Jalna Alyce Alderman was born in Walla Walla, Washington on 29 May 1931. Her work was influential in establishing the theory of gender-based violence against women and girls and in establishing women's studies as a discipline in UK universities.

Having earned a BA in Sociology and Social Institutions from UC Berkeley in 1956, she moved to the UK in 1959. Hanmer established early Women's Studies courses at the University of Bradford and worked as Professor of Women's Studies and Director of the Research Centre on Violence, Abuse and Gender Relations at Leeds Metropolitan University in the UK.

Hanmer was involved in setting up National Women's Aid Federation (NWAF) and later the Women's Aid Federation England (WAFE). Her policy research included developing a new approach to men who kerb crawl for prostitutes making changes to policing to improve convictions for rape. She is the inspiration for a character in There Are No Beginnings, by playwright Charley Miles about women who lived in Yorkshire during the era of the Yorkshire Ripper.

Hanmer died of heart failure at her family home in Spain, on 25 May 2023, at the age of 91.

A collection of her papers are held by Special Collections at the Brotherton Library, University of Leeds and in the Feminist Archive North (FAN).

== Trouble & Strife ==
Hanmer was a founder member of the independent radical feminist magazine, Trouble & Strife published in Britain between 1983 and 2002. The writer Catherine Redfern noted the magazine was more of a journal with in depth articles that anticipated a radical feminism aware reader. Women's Liberation Movement publications and activities in the UK were often women-only, remaining loyal to the intention to maintain an herstorical organisational tradition.

Feminist writer Julie Bindel described Hanmer as one of the most influential and important feminists of the past decades. She was interviewed by The British Library as part of their collection recording activists of the women's liberation movement. Hanmer spoke about how consciousness-raising groups raised women's collective consciousness about their oppression.

Hanmer was a founder member of Feminist Archive North and was a trustee until her retirement in 2021. She wrote about the importance of protecting feminist archives. FAN holds a wide variety of women's liberation movement materials and ephemera including personal archives, conference papers and complete runs of journals such as Spare Rib, Shrew, Women’s Report, Scarlet Woman, Shifra and Women’s Voice. It holds materials relating to Hanmer's time at Trouble & Strife and her work prior to coordinating Bradford University Women's Studies Unit.
