= Györgyi Lang =

Hungarian singer and actress (1957–2023)

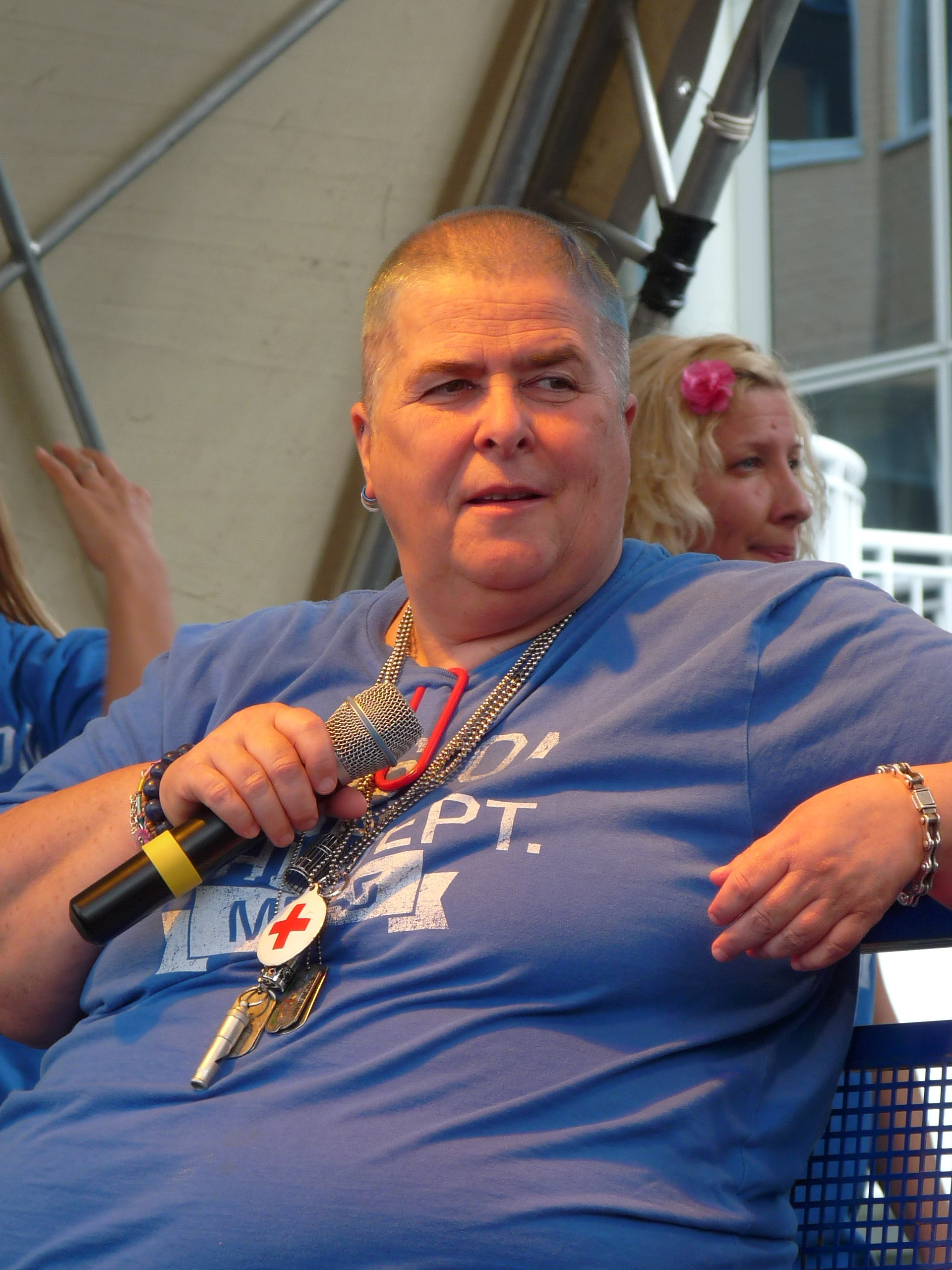
- Lang in 2010

Background information
- Born: 10 May 1957; Szeged, Hungary
- Died: 20 May 2023 (aged 66)
- Instrument: Vocals

Györgyi Lang (10 May 1957 – 20 May 2023) was a Hungarian actress and singer. She was a member of the Hungarian music duo Pa-dö-dő.

Lang died on 20 May 2023, at the age of 66.

== Discography ==
- Pa-Dö-Dő I. (1989)
- Kiabálj! (1990)
- Pa-Dö-Dő (1989–1991) (1992)
- Tessék dudálni (1992)
- Szép az élet, és én is szép vagyok (1994)
- Einstand (1995)
- Kérem a következőt! (1996)
- Nekünk nyolc (1997)
- 10 éves a Pa-Dö-Dő – A Mari kettővel kevesebb (1998)
- Pa-Dö-Dő 10 – Koncert 1999 (1999)
- Mi egy nagy család vagyunk (2000)
- Egy kicsit bulizgatunk? (2001)
- Tuinvan. Marivan. Györgyivan. Közösvan. (2002)
- Beszt Of Pa-Dö-Dő: PDD 15 Jubileum (2003)
- Had' énekeljünk mi is az idén! (2003)
- Igen, mi az idén is csináltunk új lemezt... (2004)
- Nem volt egyszerű, csókoltatunk Mária (2005)
- Habár a hazai lemezeladás... (2006)
- Így 20 felett ránk fér egy kis Generál (2008)
- 20.bé (Nát fór szél!) (2008)
- Csomagot kaptam (2009)
- Hozott anyagból (2011)
- Ajándék (2013)
- Pa-Dö-Dő (the songs from the first disc digitally remixed, 2013)
- Pa-Dö-Dő 2. – Kiabálj! (the songs of the second disc digitally remixed, 2013)
