= Beverly Torok-Storb =

American physician and academic (1948–2023)

Beverly Jo Torok-Storb
- Torok-Storb in 2016
- Born: 1948
- Died: May 5, 2023 (aged 75); Seattle, Washington, U.S.
- Education: University of Pittsburgh; PennWest Edinboro
- Scientific career
- Workplaces: Fred Hutchinson Cancer Research Center
- Thesis: Effects of murine genotype W/Wv on the proliferative response of various stem cell compartments (1975)

Beverly Jo Torok-Storb (1948 – May 5, 2023) was an American physician who was Professor of Clinical Research at the Fred Hutchinson Cancer Research Center. Her work considered the stem cells that generate blood and the microenvironment of bone marrow.

== Early life and education ==
Torok-Storb was born in 1948, in Erie, Pennsylvania, where she was raised in a public housing project. She became interested in biology during high school, then was an undergraduate student at PennWest Edinboro. Torok-Storb worked toward her doctorate at the University of Pittsburgh.

== Research and career ==
Torok-Storb joined the Fred Hutchinson Cancer Research Center in 1978 and studied stem cells and the microenvironment of bone marrow. Her research identified the interactions between the stem cells in blood and the supportive cells in bone marrow, enabling critical transplants in leukemia and blood cancer. Prior to the work of Torok-Storb, it was assumed that bone marrow stromal cells could be derived from Hematopoietic stem cells. In 1987, Torok-Storb showed that this was not possible. She showed that cells within the bone marrow send signals to stem cells which determine whether transplantations are successful. The National Heart, Lung, and Blood Institute awarded Torok-Storb a $16.7 million grant to develop stem cell therapies.

Torok-Storb also worked with an animal model that could predict the outcomes of hematopoietic stem cell transplants in humans.

Torok-Storb was part of the Cooperative Center of Excellence in Hematology.

== Academic service ==
Torok-Storb was an advocate for building a more inclusive academic culture. She developed research opportunities for undergraduate students, high school students and people from historically excluded groups. She said that her mentorship has come from her upbringing, “the only reason I made it as far as I did is because of special teachers along the way who let me know that I was capable and I could do it,”.

== Death ==
Torok-Storb died at her home in Seattle, Washington, on May 5, 2023, at the age of 75.

== Publications ==
- P A McSweeney; D Niederwieser; J A Shizuru; et al. (1 June 2001). "Hematopoietic cell transplantation in older patients with hematologic malignancies: replacing high-dose cytotoxic therapy with graft-versus-tumor effects". Blood. 97 (11): 3390–3400. doi:10.1182/blood.v97.11.3390. ISSN 0006-4971. PMID 11369628. Wikidata Q40706569.
- Simmons PJ; Torok-Storb B (1 July 1991). "Identification of stromal cell precursors in human bone marrow by a novel monoclonal antibody, STRO-1". Blood. 78 (1): 55–62. ISSN 0006-4971. PMID 2070060. Wikidata Q41675626.
- Christian W. Scharenberg; Michael A. Harkey; Beverly Torok-Storb (15 January 2002). "The ABCG2 transporter is an efficient Hoechst 33342 efflux pump and is preferentially expressed by immature human hematopoietic progenitors" (PDF). Blood. 99 (2): 507–12. doi:10.1182/blood.v99.2.507. ISSN 0006-4971. PMID 11781231. Wikidata Q28214940.

== Awards ==
- 2013 Community Service Award
- 2018 Seattle Association for Women in Science Award
- 2018 Oliver Press Award for Extraordinary Mentorship
- 2021 Hutch's first Humanity in Science Leadership Award
