= Robert Shelley =

American attorney and politician (1941–2023)

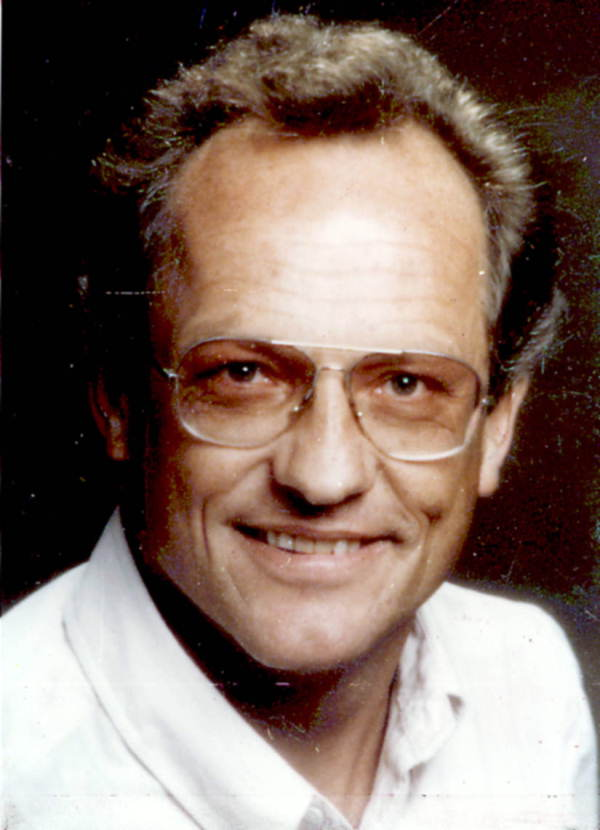

Member of the Florida House of Representatives for the 92nd district
- In office 1983–1990

Personal details
- Born: July 27, 1941 New York City, New York, U.S.
- Died: May 24, 2023 (aged 81)
- Party: Republican
- Occupation: Fireman

Robert J. Shelley (July 27, 1941 – May 24, 2023) was an American attorney and former politician in the state of Florida.

Shelley was born in New York City. He came to Florida in 1969 and attended Broward Community College. He is a former fireman and fire chief. He served in the Florida House of Representatives from 1983 to 1990, as a Republican, representing the 92nd district.
