= David Stripp =

English cricketer (1935–2023)

Personal information
- Full name: David Arthur Stripp
- Born: 4 April 1935; Crawley Down, Sussex, England
- Died: 12 May 2023 (aged 88)
- Batting: Right-handed
- Bowling: Right-arm fast-medium

Domestic team information
- Years: Team
- 1956–1957: Sussex

Career statistics
Competition	First-class
Matches	12
Runs scored	183
Batting average	10.76
100s/50s	–/–
Top score	32*
Balls bowled	509
Wickets	6
Bowling average	49.50
5 wickets in innings	–
10 wickets in match	–
Best bowling	2/12
Catches/stumpings	10/–
- Source: Cricinfo, 6 January 2012

David Arthur Stripp (4 April 1935 – 12 May 2023) was an English cricketer. Stripp was a right-handed batsman who bowled right-arm fast-medium. He was born at Crawley Down, Sussex.

Stripp made his first-class debut for Sussex against Essex in the 1956 County Championship. He made eleven further first-class appearances for the county, the last of which came against Hampshire in the 1957 County Championship. In his twelve first-class matches, he scored a total of 183 runs at an average of 10.76, with a high score of 32 not out. With the ball, he took six wickets at a bowling average of 49.50, with best figures of 2/12.

Stripp died on 12 May 2023, at the age of 88.
