= Lahouari Godih =

Algerian boxer (1929–2023)

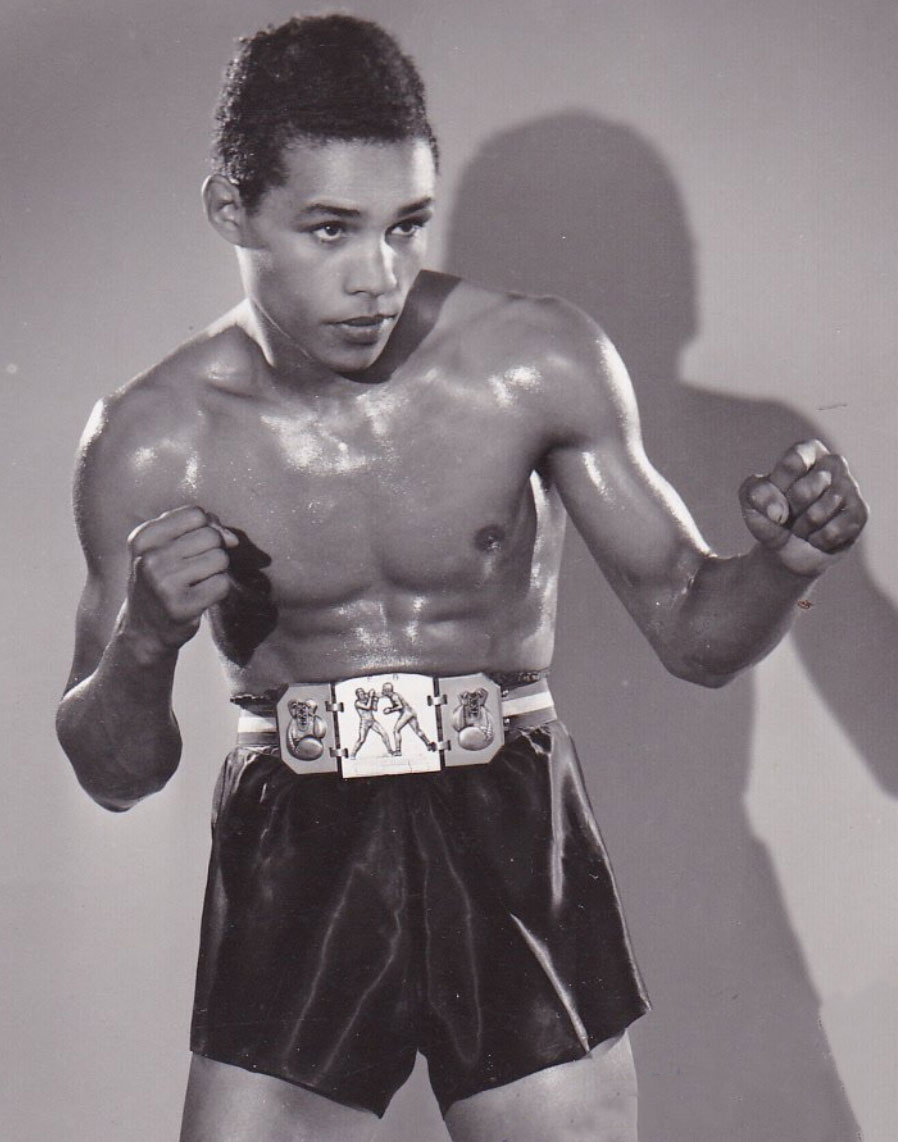

Personal information
- Native name: هواري قديح
- Nickname: Terror of the ring
- Nationality: Algerian
- Born: April 29, 1929 Oran, Algeria
- Died: May 27, 2023 (aged 94) New York City (United States)

Boxing career

Lahouari Godih (Arabic: هواري قديح; April 29, 1929 – May 27, 2023), sometimes spelled Lahouari Goudih or Hedj Lahouari Godih, was an Algerian boxer and politician. He was also a member of the National Liberation Front (FLN) from 1956 and worked with the Algerian mission to the United Nations from 1958.

== Biography ==
=== Childhood and early years ===
Lahouari Godih was born on April 29, 1929, in Oran, specifically in Haï M'dina Jdida, Algeria. He was the brother-in-law of Hadj Debbi Lakbad, the former member of the board and steering committee of Mouloudia d'Oran who died in 2004.

Lahouari had a childhood marked by the early loss of his parents, leaving him orphaned at a young age. His grandmother raised him afterwards. At the age of 10, he began working after his mother died of typhoid fever by becoming a cordwainer.

Lahouari started working after his mother's death from typhoid fever. He held various jobs such as supervisor, market porter, and cordwainer. Between 1942 and 1945, during World War II, his visits to American bases shaped his destiny. It was there that American soldiers taught him the basics of boxing and gave him the desire to embark on this adventure. Trainer François Constantin opened the way for him by pitting him against amateur boxers in fights organized for the US Army.

At the age of 13, Lahouari caught the attention of François Ibanez, an Oranian manager, who directed him towards the arenas of victory. He quickly showed promising talents and, at the age of 16, he won his first victory, earning 6 francs. For him, boxing was above all a means of freeing himself from poverty and misery, when hunger was felt.

At 16, he won his first victory, earning 6 francs. He then became a great hope of African boxing. As the champion of Oran, Algeria, and North Africa, as well as a finalist in the French championship, he was considered a "Terror of the Ring," the title given to the best Oranian boxers.

At the age of 17, weighing 54 kilograms, he reached the final of the Oran championship, generating great expectations in the world of African boxing.

Between 1946 and 1950, Lahouari Godih accumulated a total of 55 victories in various fights. However, it was in December 1950, at the age of 21, that he truly captivated a considerable crowd at the New Arenas of Oran. This landmark event took place during a tournament organized in honor of the French boxer born in Algeria and deceased in 1949, Marcel Cerdan. This performance allowed Lahouari to distinguish himself and be noticed in boxing circles, thus consolidating his growing reputation.

=== Professional career ===
In 1951, Lahouari Godih took a boat to Marseille and then went to Paris, where his stay did not go unnoticed. It was in the Wagram Hall in Paris that he became the French champion of the "lightweight" category after a fierce fight between two childhood friends from Oran, Hocine Khalfi and Laouari Godih. During his stay in Paris, he fought in 27 matches and won 27 victories. The French newspapers called him the "incomparable Marcel Cerdan" and "the talented Lahouari Godih."

In 1958, Lahouari permanently settled in the United States. There, he proved himself in the prestigious ring of Madison Square Garden in New York, participating in about fifteen fights.

Throughout his career, Lahouari Godih fought a total of 120 professional matches between 1951 and 1962. He traveled the globe, fighting in Africa, Australia, and Europe, in iconic cities such as Abidjan, London, Casablanca, Copenhagen, Glasgow, Rome, Istanbul, Brisbane, and Sydney.

As a practicing Muslim, Lahouari Godih did not smoke tobacco, did not drink alcohol, and observed the fast (saoum) twice a week. His life was marked by discipline that helped him remain true to his roots throughout his half-century of American life.

His last fight was on January 6, 1962, against Les McFaddin at Madison Square Garden in New York.

=== Political career ===
In 1956, Lahouari Godih joined the civil organization of the National Liberation Front and participated in numerous missions against the French colonizer. However, he was arrested and sentenced to death, and remained in prison until the independence of Algeria in 1962.

The late Godih Lahouari was a member of the first mission of the National Liberation Front (FLN) to the United Nations, led at the time by Hocine Ait Ahmed, Mohamed Yazid, and Abdelkader Chanderli.

He was also a bodyguard in New York.

At the age of 33, Lahouari decided to end his boxing career in 1962. He then turned to a new mission as a representative of Algeria to the United Nations. This allowed him to meet almost all Algerian heads of state, including Abdelaziz Bouteflika, with whom he maintained a friendship that lasted even when Bouteflika became president of the country in 1999.

== Tribute ==
On July 9, 2009, Godih was the guest of honor at the Museum of the Moudjahid in the Oran Province, at the joint initiative with the Oran Youth and Sports Directorate. An exhibition of photos and posters depicting the champion's career offered visitors a more detailed view of the extent of this boxer's achievements.

== Death ==
Lahouari Godih died on May 27, 2023, in New York at the age of 94. During his working visit to New York, the Minister of Foreign Affairs and the National Community Abroad, Ahmed Attaf, attended the tribute ceremony for the late Godih.

Lahouari Godih's body was repatriated on June 1, 2023, from John F. Kennedy International Airport in New York and arrived at Ahmed Ben Bella International Airport in Oran on the same day. The funeral was held at the Aïn El Beida cemetery in Oran the following day, after Friday prayers.
