= Thembinkosi Apleni =

South African politician (died 2023)

Permanent delegate to the National Council of Provinces from the Eastern Cape
- In office 23 May 2019 – 12 May 2023

Personal details
- Born: Thembinkosi Tevin Apleni
- Died: 12 May 2023 (aged 49) Sweet Waters township, Qonce, Eastern Cape, South Africa
- Party: Economic Freedom Fighters (from 2014)
- Spouse: Nombuyiselo Apleni
- Children: 3

Thembinkosi Tevin Apleni (died 12 May 2023) was a South African politician who served as a permanent delegate to the National Council of Provinces from May 2019 until his death in May 2023. He was one of six permanent delegates from the Eastern Cape. Apleni was a member of the Economic Freedom Fighters (EFF) and served as the party's provincial treasurer from November 2022 until May 2023. He was previously the party's provincial secretary from 2015 until 2018 when he was elected deputy provincial chairperson.

== Life and career ==
Apleni matriculated and soon achieved a diploma in paralegal studies. He joined the EFF after its founding and was appointed the party's provincial secretary in the Eastern Cape in 2015. In August 2016, Apleni was elected as one of the EFF's proportional representation councillors in Buffalo City. The first few months of Apleni's councillor term were marked by the ejection of the EFF caucus from council over a dress code dispute.

In October 2018, Apleni was elected the EFF's deputy provincial chairperson. He was elected provincial treasurer of the EFF at the party's conference in November 2022.

== Parliamentary career ==
On 23 May 2019, Apleni became a permanent delegate to the National Council of Provinces from the Eastern Cape. He was one of nine permanent EFF representatives in the legislature. On 24 June, he was given his committee assignments.

=== Committee assignments ===
- Select Committee on Education and Technology, Sports, Arts and Culture
- Select Committee on Health and Social Services
- Select Committee on Transport, Public Service and Administration, Public Works and Infrastructure
- Select Committee on Trade and Industry, Economic Development, Small Business Development, Tourism, Employment and Labour

== Personal life and death ==
Apleni had been married to Nombuyiselo Apleni for thirteen years at the time of his death. He had two children with her. Apleni also had an older daughter from a previous relationship.

Apleni committed suicide on 12 May 2023 at his home in the Sweet Waters township outside Qonce in the Eastern Cape. He was 49 years old.
