= Lotta Bouvin-Sundberg =

Swedish broadcast journalist and news presenter (1959–2023)

- Born: Charlotte Bouvin; 2 October 1959; Frösön, Sweden
- Died: 1 May 2023 (aged 63); Stockholm, Sweden

Charlotte Bouvin Sundberg (2 October 1959 – 1 May 2023), known professionally as Lotta Bouvin-Sundberg, was a Swedish broadcast journalist and news presenter. She was one of SVT's most well-known faces and led, among other things, Aktuellt and Gomorron Sverige. Bouvin-Sundberg also hosted major extra broadcasts, election programs and the Nobel broadcast.

== Biography ==
Bouvin-Sundberg came to Saltsjöbaden during her formative years. She was the daughter of government councilor Åke Bouvin and master of philosophy Gunilla Swan, as well as the granddaughter of county council director Erik Bouvin.

Bouvin-Sundberg began her journalistic career as a reporter on local radio and in TT's radio editorial office. She was recruited to SVT as presenter for Rapport's morning broadcasts in 1993. She was one of the presenters for SVT's live broadcast of the Nobel Festival in 2000–2001 and, together with several other people, led Gomorron Sweden.

== Personal life and death ==
From 1988 until her death, Bouvin-Sundberg was married to singer and lawyer Pelle Sundberg (born 1956). They had two children together, a son (born 1989) and a daughter (born 1992). Bouvin-Sundberg died in Kungsholmen, Stockholm on 1 May 2023, at the age of 63.
