= Barry Dwolatzky =

South African software engineer (1952–2023)

- Born: 29 April 1952; Union of South Africa
- Died: 16 May 2023 (aged 71); Johannesburg, Gauteng, South Africa
- Education: University of the Witwatersrand
- Spouse: Rina King
- Scientific career
- Fields: Software engineering, computer science
- Workplaces: University of the Witwatersrand; University of the People

Barry Dwolatzky (29 April 1952 – 16 May 2023) was a South African software engineer. He was a professor emeritus at the University of the Witwatersrand Joburg Centre for Software Engineering. Dwolatzky was on University of the People's computer science advisory board. He was an anti-apartheid activist and in the late 1980s he joined the African National Congress's armed wing, Umkhonto we Sizwe ("spear of the nation").

== Education ==
Dwolatzky completed a Bachelors of Science degree in 1975 and a Ph.D. in 1979, both in electrical engineering at the University of the Witwatersrand. He was a postdoctoral researcher at the University of Manchester Institute of Science and Technology and GEC Marconi.

== Career ==
In 1989, Dwolatzky joined University of the Witwatersrand as a senior lecturer, becoming a full professor in 2000. He was appointed as an emeritus professor at the Joburg Centre for Software Engineering in 2005. Dwolatzky was on University of the People's computer science advisory board.

Dwolatzky was a fellow of the South African Institute of Electrical Engineers and The Institute of IT Professionals South Africa (IITPSA).

== Death ==
Dwolatzky died in Johannesburg on 16 May 2023, at the age of 71.
