= Execution of Yousef Mehrdad and Sadrollah Fazeli Zare =

2023 executions in Iran

Yousef Mehrdad and Sadrollah Fazeli Zare were two men who were executed in Iran on 8 May 2023 for blasphemy. Mehrdad and Zare had run multiple anti-religion online spaces that promoted atheism and criticized Islam.

== Background ==
Mehrdad and Zare had run a Telegram group called "Critique of Superstition and Religion." The government of Iran alleged that the pair ran at least a dozen other online groups and channels, and that the pair had promoted content that insulted Islam, the prophets, and was pro-atheism. The Iranian judiciary also reported that Mehrdad's phone contained a video of a burning Quran, which was shared publicly.

The pair were arrested in May 2020. They were sentenced to death in April 2021; the Supreme Court of Iran confirmed the ruling in July of the same year. Reportedly, both Mehrdad and Zare were not permitted to have family visits or make phone calls for eight months; Mehrdad would go on hunger strike in February 2022 to protest this. Other reports indicated that both men were held in solitary confinement for several months, and were denied access to an attorney. Both men were hanged in Arak Prison on 8 May 2023.

The hangings came after months of protests in response to the death of Mahsa Amini. The Iranian government had increased its use of capital punishment during and after the protests, with its response described as a "crackdown."

== International response ==
Multiple international organizations criticized the arrest and the execution. Mahmood Amiry-Moghaddam, head of Iran Human Rights, criticized the "medieval nature" of Iran's theocracy in the wake of the execution. Amnesty International described the executions as a "shocking new low for Iran's authorities," and as a "grotesque assault on the rights to life and freedom of religion." Multiple governmental bodies in the United States similarly condemned the executions, and called for an international response. Iranian outlets described these condemnations as "yet another act of interference in Iran’s domestic affairs."
