= Wan Zhexian =

Chinese mathematician (1927–2023)

- 万哲先
- Born: 7 November 1927; Zichuan, Shandong, China
- Died: 30 May 2023 (aged 95); Beijing, China
- Education: Tsinghua University
- Scientific career
- Fields: Mathematics
- Workplaces: Academy of Mathematics and Systems science, CAS

Chinese name
- Simplified Chinese: 万哲先
- Traditional Chinese: 萬哲先
Transcriptions
Standard Mandarin
- Hanyu Pinyin: Wàn Zhéxiān

Wan Zhexian (Chinese: 万哲先; 7 November 1927 – 30 May 2023) was a Chinese mathematician, an academician of the Chinese Academy of Sciences.

== Biography ==
Wan was born in Zichuan (now Zichuan District of Zibo), Shandong, on 7 November 1927, while his ancestral home is in Xiantao, Hubei. He attended Zhangdian Primary School (张店小学).

Wan was admitted to the Mathematics Department of National South-West Associated University in 1944. He graduated from Tsinghua University in 1948 and taught there after graduation. In 1950, he was transferred to the Institute of Systems science, Chinese Academy of Sciences, where he successively worked as an assistant, assistant researcher, associate researcher, and researcher. In the same year, he studied classical group under the guidance of Professor Hua Luogeng, and co-wrote "Classical Group" with Hua Luogeng in 1963.

Wan joined the China Association for Promoting Democracy in 1953 and the Chinese Communist Party in 1985.

On 30 May 2023, he died of an illness in Beijing, aged 95.

== Honours and awards ==
- 1987 State Natural Science Award (Third Class) for the isomorphism theory of Classical Group
- 1991 Member of the Chinese Academy of Sciences (CAS)
- 1995 2nd Hua Luogeng Mathematics Prize
