= Aida Khasanova =

Uzbekistani fencer and referee (1983–2023)

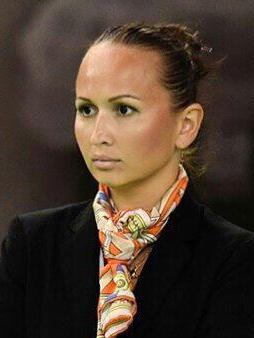

Personal information
- Nationality: Uzbekistan
- Born: 4 August 1983 Tashkent, Uzbek SSR, USSR
- Died: 23 May 2023 (aged 39)

Sport
- Sport: Fencing

Aida Khasanova (4 August 1983 – 23 May 2023) was an Uzbekistani fencer and international fencing referee. She was the Uzbekistani fencing champion in foil in 1998, 1999, 2000, and 2002 and won Uzbekistan Cup on saber in 2008. She competed in the individual foil events at the World Championships in Saint Petersburg, Russia in 2007 and Turin, Italy in 2006 representing Uzbekistan.

In 2014 Khasanova became the first international fencing referee in the history of Uzbekistan fencing on three weapons and from then was a Fédération Internationale d'Escrime referee at major international fencing championships and tournaments.

In 2019 Khasanova was selected to be the first referee from Uzbekistan and Central Asia to go to the Olympic Games in Tokyo. She was also the only female fencing referee representing Asia at the 2020 Games.

Khasanova died on 23 May 2023, at the age of 39.
