= Lloyd Inman Hendricks =

American politician (1942–2023)

Member of the South Carolina House of Representatives
- In office 1977–1987

Personal details
- Born: March 26, 1942 Greenville, South Carolina, U.S.
- Died: May 11, 2023 (aged 81)
- Party: Democratic
- Spouse: Susan Lamon Spangler (m. 1966)
- Education: University of South Carolina; University of South Carolina School of Law

Lloyd Inman Hendricks (March 26, 1942 – May 11, 2023) is an American politician. He served as a Democratic member of the South Carolina House of Representatives.

== Life and career ==
Hendricks was born in Greenville, South Carolina. He attended Dreher High School, the University of South Carolina and the University of South Carolina School of Law.

Hendricks served in the South Carolina House of Representatives from 1977 to 1987.

Hendricks died on May 11, 2023, at the age of 81.
