= Claes Insulander =

Swedish sailor (1945–2023)

Karl Claes Håkan Insulander (April 5, 1945 – May 29, 2023) was a Swedish church musician, sailor and sea captain. Insulander served as master of the historic Swedish steamship S/S Mariefred in 1978–2021, as well as chief executive officer of its shipping company.

Claes Insulander was born in Mariefred in 1945. He studied at the College of Music in Stockholm and graduated as an organist. After graduation he became a church musician in Mariefred. In the early 1970s, Insulander became involved as a volunteer in the historic steamship S/S Mariefred, the steamboat that had served the same route between Stockholm and Gripsholm and Mariefred in lake Mälaren every year since 1903. While working for the steamboat company, he studied at naval school to become a commander. As such he was hired by the S/S Mariefred shipping company and became in 1978 its sea captain. During the winters, Insulander served similar positions in the merchant navy. After retirement from the merchant navy, Insulander was engaged in giving support and assistance to former drug addicts in his local inner city neighbourhood in Stockholm.

In 2021 he was ousted from the steamboat company after disagreements regarding a planned modernization and conversion of the steamship's boiler from being fired by black coal to conventional oil burners. A year later he was occasionally brought back at the steamboat as it had turned out difficult to find a sustainable replacement. Claes Insulander died at 78 in 2023. He was survived by his two brothers.
