= Guan Xingya =

Chinese engineer (1932–2023)

- 关兴亚
- Born: 7 February 1932; Fengtian, Fengtian Province, Manchukuo
- Died: 23 May 2023 (aged 91); Shanghai, China
- Education: Fudan University
- Scientific career
- Fields: Petrochemical industry
- Workplaces: Sinopec Group

Chinese name
- Simplified Chinese: 关兴亚
- Traditional Chinese: 關興亞
Transcriptions
Standard Mandarin
- Hanyu Pinyin: Guān Xìngyà

Guan Xingya (Chinese: 关兴亚; 7 February 1932 – 23 May 2023) was a Chinese petroleum engineer, and an academician of the Chinese Academy of Engineering. He was the pioneer and technological founder of China's acrylonitrile catalyst and its complete process.

== Biography ==
Guan was born in Fengtian, Fengtian Province, Manchukuo (now Shenyang, Liaoning), on 7 February 1932. In 1951, he entered Jiaotong University, but transferred to Fudan University the next year.

After graduating in 1955, he was assigned to the Acetylene Chemistry Research Office of Shenyang Institute of Chemical Technology, and reassigned to the Petrochemistry Process Room of Shanghai Research Institute of Chemical Industry two years later. He moved up the ranks to become director of the Research Room 2 in June 1960 and deputy chief engineer in July 1981.

On 23 May 2023, he died of an illness in Shanghai, aged 92.

== Honours and awards ==
- 1988 State Science and Technology Progress Award (Second Class) for the research and development of MB-82 Acrylonitrile Catalyst
- 1993 State Science and Technology Progress Award (First Class) for the research and industrial application of MB-86 Acrylonitrile Catalyst
- 1995 Member of the Chinese Academy of Engineering (CAE)
