= Jerzy Szteliga =

Polish politician (1953–2023)

Member of the Sejm
- In office 14 October 1993 – 18 October 2005

Personal details
- Born: Jerzy Stanisław Szteliga; 9 May 1953 Zebrzydowice, Lesser Poland Voivodeship, Poland
- Died: 8 May 2023 (aged 69)
- Party: SdRP; SLD

Jerzy Stanisław Szteliga (9 May 1953 – 8 May 2023) was a Polish politician. A member of Social Democracy of the Republic of Poland and later the Democratic Left Alliance, he served in the Sejm from 1993 to 2005.

Szteliga died on 8 May 2023, one day before his 70th birthday.
