= Everett M. Snortland =

American politician (1937–2023)

Member of the Montana House of Representatives
- In office 1970–1971

Personal details
- Born: February 23, 1937 Conrad, Montana, U.S.
- Died: May 1, 2023 (aged 86) Conrad, Montana, U.S.
- Education: Montana State College

Everett Merrill Snortland (February 23, 1937 – May 1, 2023) was an American politician. He served as a member of the Montana House of Representatives.

== Life and career ==
Snortland was born in Conrad, Montana. He attended Conrad High School and Montana State College.

Snortland served in the Montana House of Representatives from 1970 to 1971.

Snortland was a lobbyist for Montana Farm Bureau Association.

Snortland died on May 1, 2023, at the age of 86.
