= Ísak Harðarson =

Icelandic poet and translator (1956–2023)

Ísak Harðarson (11 August 1956 – 12 May 2023) was a seminal 20th century Icelandic poet and translator. He had also written short stories, novels, and a memoir. He graduated from the University of Iceland in 1977. His first book, a poetry collection called Þriggja orða nafn (Three-word name) was released in 1982. In the wake of its success, Ísak published a deluge of poetry, short story collections, novels, and a memoir. His poetry appeared in the anthology Ský fyrir ský (Cloud by Cloud) in 2000. Ísak has written lyrics, and his poetry has been performed to music, and his work has been anthologised abroad in publications such as The Cafe Review (trans. Meg Matich). His work, as both poet and proseist, is characterised by surreal and absurd descriptions of everyday life, as well as self-deprecating humour, as in his poem Skáld-Pabbi. Likewise, his texts satirise political, social, and economic structures both within Iceland and abroad.

He had translated many works from English and Nordic languages into Icelandic over the past several decades.

He had received the Rithöfundasjóður Ríkisútvarpsins award for his poetry. In 2011, his tenth poetry book Rennur upp um nótt (It Comes Up at Night; 2009) was nominated to the Nordic Council Literature Prize.

After a 9-year poetry hiatus, Harðarson released a book of poems entitled Ellefti snertur af yfirsýn (2018), followed by a collection of absurdist short stories Hitinn á vaxmyndasafninu (The heat in the wax museum) 2021.

== Selected publications ==
- Ræflatestamentið (Reykjavík : Mál og menning, 1984)
- Veggfóðraður óendanleiki (Reykjavík : Mál og menning, 1986)
- Útganga um augað læst (Reykjavík : Svart á hvítu, 1987)
- Snæfellsjökull í garðinum : átta heilagra nútímamanna sögur (Reykjavík : Iðunn, 1989)
- Síðustu hugmyndir fiska um líf á þurru (Reykjavík : Iðunn, 1989)
- Stokkseyri (Reykjavík : Forlagið, 1994) ISBN 9789979532583 [Review: by Hallberg Hallmundsson World Literature Today, v69 n3 (Summer, 1995): 598-599]
- Í gegnum eldinn with Tholly Rósmundsdóttir (Kópavogi : Krossgötur, 1994)
- Hvítur ísbjörn (Reykjavík : Forlagið, 1995)
- Þú sem ert á himnum - þú ert hér! : játningasaga (Reykjavík : Forlagið, 1996)
- Mannveiðihandbókin (Reykjavík : Forlagið, 1999) ISBN 9789979533825 [Review, by Henry Kratz World Literature Today, v74 n3 (Summer, 2000): 650-651]
- Ský fyrir ský : ljóð 1982-1995 (Reykjavík : Forlagið, 2000)
- Hjörturinn skiptir um dvalarstað (Reykjavík : Forlagið, 2002)
- Rennur upp um nótt (Akranes : Uppheimar 2009)
- Söngur guðsfuglsins : sagan af unganum sem vissi ekki til hvers fuglar voru (illustrated by Helgi Þorgils Friðjónsson) (Akranes : Uppheimar 2011)
- Ellefti snertur af yfirsýn (Reykjavík : Forlagið, 2018)
- Hitinn á vaxmyndasafninu (Reykjavik: JPV Útgáfa, 2021)
