= Mohammad Jamal (singer) =

Lebanese singer, composer and actor (1934–2022)

- مُحمَّد جمال
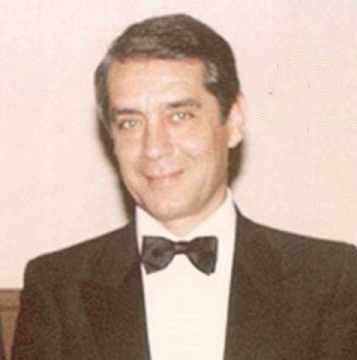
- Born: Jamaluddin Tiffaha; 24 May 1934; Tripoli, Lebanon
- Died: 26 May 2023 (aged 89); Los Angeles, US
- Other names: Mohamed Jamal; Mohammed Jamal

Mohammad Jamal (Arabic: مُحمَّد جمال; 24 May 1934 – 26 May 2023), stage name of Jamaluddin Tiffaha (Arabic: جمال الدين مُحمَّد نجيب), was a Lebanese singer and actor.

== Life and career ==
Born in Tripoli, Lebanon, to a Lebanese mother and a Music teacher of Palestinian origins on his father’s side and of Greek origins on his mother‘s side, who owned a shop selling and repairing musical instruments, Jamal was trained in singing since childhood. Between 1949 and 1951 he moved in Iraq with his family, and there he was introduced to the Iraqi maqam style. After failing to graduate in electrical engineering, in 1954 he started his professional musical career, working for Radio Lebanon and recording two songs he composed, "Alouli Ahl el-Hawa" and "Asmar Ya Shaghel Albi". While performing at Casino Ajram, he was noted by film director Helmy Rafla, and made his acting debut in the 1956 Egyptian film El-Armala el-Taroub, in which he also performed two songs.

In 1957, Jamal married the singer Taroub, and formed with her a successful musical duo, singing in both Lebanese and Egyptian accents. Best known for the song "Oul Kaman", their professional partnership was interrupted by their 1964 divorce. In the following years Jamal got several hits, notably "Ah Ya Emm Hamada", a highly successful cover in Arabic of "Darla dirladada" in which he also served as producer, and continued to appear in local musical films. He also collaborated with Rahbani brothers, appearing in several of their musicals and TV-shows.

Following the Lebanese Civil War, Jamal decided to move from Lebanon and in 1981 he settled in Los Angeles. Following the 1985 release of the album Allimni el-Hobb he basically retired from showbusiness. He died on 26 May 2023, at the age of 89.
