= Michael Roskin =

American political scientist

Michael G. Roskin (1939 – May 2, 2023) was an American political scientist best known for his multi-edition textbook, Countries and Concepts.

== Background ==
Roskin received his A.B. at University of California, Berkeley and M.A. at University of California, Los Angeles. He served as a journalist and foreign service officer for the U.S. Information Agency before earning his Ph.D. in international relations at The American University.

== Career ==
Roskin began teaching at Lycoming College in 1972. Roskin served as Visiting Professor of Foreign Policy at the United States Army War College from 1991 to 1994. He is the author of five political science textbooks.

In 2008, Roskin retired from teaching, after being named a Fulbright Scholar; he continued to lecture.

In 2020, Roskin wrote that "anti-Russian accusations have switched parties" from Republicans denouncing Democrats in the 1950s and 1960s to Democrats bashing Republicans in the 2010s and 2020s as traitors under the influence of Moscow (then USSR, now Russian Federation). He compared the McCarthyist attack in the 1950s on "China Hands" to Steve Bannon's "deconstruction of the administrative state." He noted that Kennan declined to judge if Alger Hiss was a spy. (He probably was.)" He compared the Hiss case to President Donald J. Trump's "operative" Paul Manafort's own "deep contacts" with Russian intelligence agents. However, he contrasted with the past a current "willingness of many career officials to resign."

== Death ==
Michael Roskin died on May 2, 2023, at the age of 84.

== Works ==
According to the Library of Congress, Roskin has published:

- Other governments of Europe: Sweden, Spain, Italy, Yugoslavia, and East Germany (1977)
- Countries and concepts: an introduction to comparative politics (1982, 1986, 1989, 1992, 1995, 1998, 2001)
- Political science: an introduction, Prentice-Hall (1974, 1985, 1988, 1994, 1997, 2000, 2003, 2006, 2008)
- IR, an introduction to international relations with Nicholas O. Berry (1990, 1991, 1993, 1997, 2002)
- National interest: from abstraction to strategy (1994)
- Rebirth of East Europe (1994, 1997)
- Hard road to democracy: four developing nations (2001)
