= Guerrino Riccardo Brusati =

Italian priest (1945–2023)

His Excellency Guerrino Riccardo Brusati
- Bishop Emeritus of Janaúba
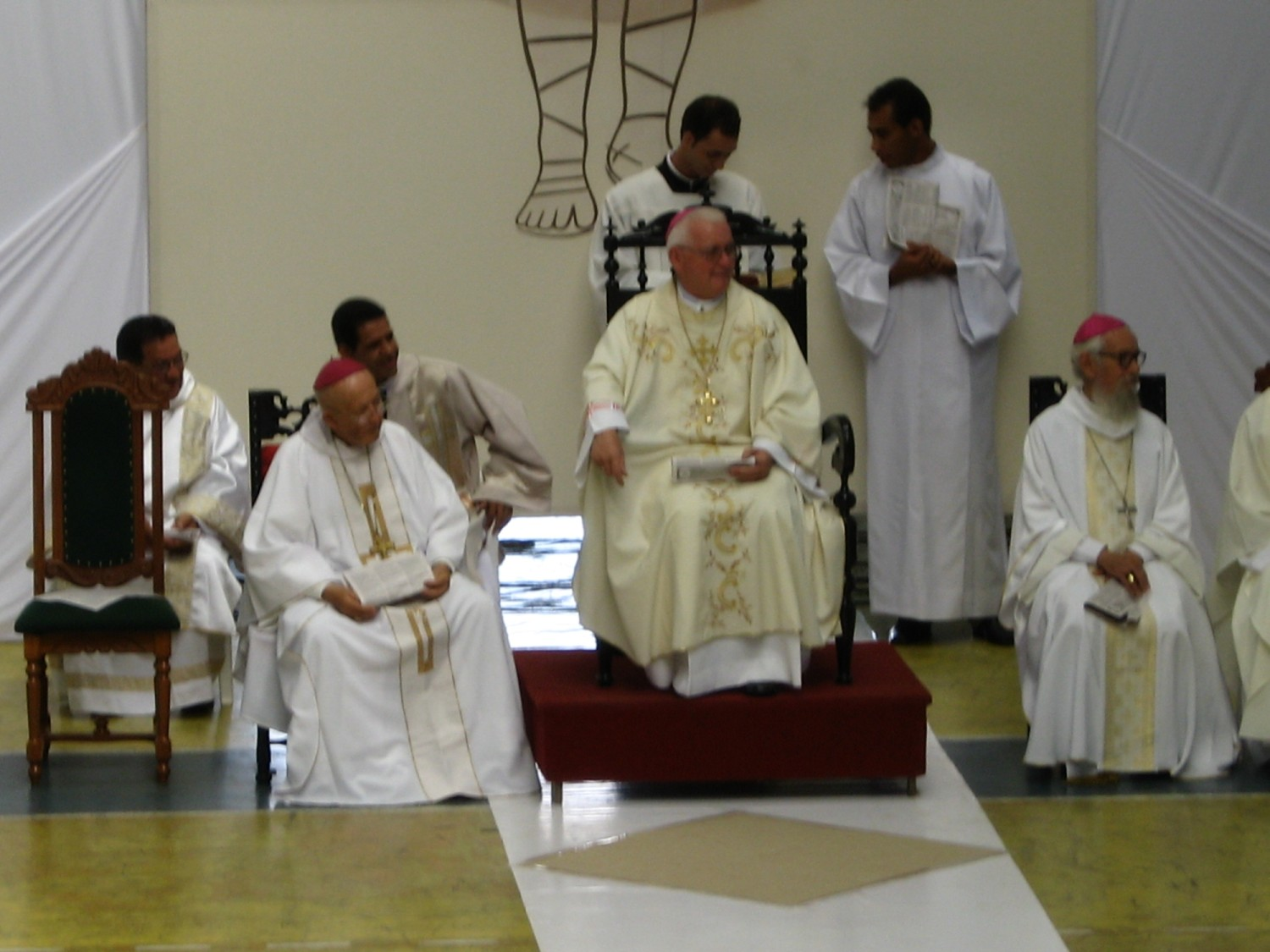
- Archdiocese: Montes Claros
- Appointed: 27 May 2015
- Term ended: 12 June 2019
- Predecessor: José Ronaldo Ribeiro
- Successor: Roberto José da Silva
- Previous post: Bishop of Caetité (2002–2015)

Orders
- Ordination: 23 June 1973 by Aldo Del Monte
- Consecration: 8 February 2003 by Aloysio José Leal Penna

Personal details
- Born: 11 April 1945 Bellinzago Novarese, Italy
- Died: 14 May 2023 (aged 78) Novara, Italy

Guerrino Riccardo Brusati (11 April 1945 – 14 May 2023) was an Italian Roman Catholic prelate. He was bishop of Caetité from 2003 to 2015 and Janaúba from 2015 to 2019.

Catholic Church titles
Preceded by José Ronaldo Ribeiro	Bishop of Janaúba; 2015–2019	Succeeded by Roberto José da Silva
Preceded by Antônio Alberto Guimarães Rezende	Bishop of Caetité; 2002–2015	Succeeded by José Roberto Silva Carvalho
