= Mosobalaje Oyawoye =

Nigerian geologist (1927–2023)

Mosobalaje Jamiu Oyawoye
- Born: Offa, Nigeria
- Died: 2023
- Burial place: Offa, Nigeria
- Education: Washington State University
- Years active: 1927-2023

Jamiu Mosobalaje Olaloye Oyawoye FAS (12 August 1927 – 22 May 2023), was a Nigerian Geologist and a community leader. He was one of the pioneer students at the famous Offa Grammar School. He obtained his PhD in Geology from Durham University in 1959. He started his career as a lecturer in the department of Geology at the University of Ibadan, where he resigned in 1977. He was chairman of Guaranty Trust Bank Plc between 1995 and 2005. He was a member of the International Geological Correlation Programme and the first president of the Geological Society of Africa.

== Biography ==
Oyawoye was born to Prince Monmodu Oyawoye of the Anilelerin Royal Family in Offa and Alhaja Sellia Amoke from the Ikirun Royal Family. He was born on 12 August 1927, in Offa, a city in Kwara State in north-central Nigeria. He attended Methodist Primary School, Ode-Olomu Offa and Offa Grammar School between 1943 and 1946. Oyawoye received his Bachelor of Science degree from Washington State University in 1955 and his Doctor of Philosophy Degree Durham University in 1959.

From 1960 he was a Geology lecturer in the Department of Geology at the University of Ibadan. He was named Professor in 1966 and promoted to head of the department of geology in 1968. He later helped found the Zambian School of Mines at the University of Zambia.

== Achievements ==
He was a member of the Nigeria Council for Science and Technology from 1970 to 1974, member of the Ibadan University Council from 1970 to 1976, member of the first board of the Federal Capital Development Authority from 1976 to 1980, and chairman of the West African Examination Council (WAEC) from 1985 to 1988. Chairman, Kaduna Refining and Petroleum Company (NNPC) (1989–1993) and Chairman, Federal College of Education Yola (1989–1993) Prof. Oyawoye was formerly the Chairman of Guaranty Trust Bank Plc. He was also a former Director at RAK Unity Petroleum and later Chairman of the Company.

Oyawoye died on 22 May 2023, at the age of 95.

== Awards ==
- Alumni Achievement Award, Washington State University (1984)
- Honorary Fellow of the Nigerian Association of Petroleum Explorationists (1991)
- Nnamdi Azikiwe (2008)
- Officer of the Order of Niger (2000)
- Commander of the Order of Niger
- Nominated for the Nigeria Centenary Honours Award (2014)
