= Peter Scott (Australian footballer) =

Australian rules footballer

Personal information
- Full name: Peter Scott
- Born: 24 March 1931
- Died: 15 May 2023 (aged 92)
- Original team: University Blacks
- Height: 184 cm (6 ft 0 in)
- Weight: 78 kg (172 lb)
- Position: Centre Half Forward

Playing career^{1}
Years	Club	Games (Goals)
1950	Hawthorn	2 (0)
- ^{1} Playing statistics correct to the end of 1950.

Peter Scott (24 March 1931 – 15 May 2023) was a former Australian rules footballer who played with Hawthorn in the Victorian Football League (VFL).

Scott was recruited from University Blacks and played the first two games of the 1950 season. After two games in which Hawthorn were badly beaten, first by Geelong and then St. Kilda, Scott realised that he was not up to the VFL standard required and he retired as a nineteen year old.
