= Roger C. Heath =

American politician

Member of the New Hampshire House of Representatives from the Carroll 3rd district
- In office 1978–1982

Member of the New Hampshire House of Representatives from the Carroll 4th district
- In office 1982–1984

Member of the New Hampshire Senate from the 3rd district
- In office 1984–1992

Personal details
- Born: January 21, 1943
- Died: May 18, 2023 (aged 80)
- Party: Republican

Roger C. Heath (January 21, 1943 – May 18, 2023) was an American politician. He served as a Republican member for the Carroll 3rd and 4th district of the New Hampshire House of Representatives. He also served as a member for the 3rd district of the New Hampshire Senate.
