= Tommy Hays =

American musician (1929–2023)

- Born: Thomas Avery Hays; October 3, 1929; Hartshorne, Oklahoma, U.S.
- Died: May 13, 2023 (aged 93) Bakersfield, California, U.S.
- Genres: Country; Bakersfield sound
- Occupations: Guitarist, bandleader, singer
- Instruments: Vocals; guitar
- Years active: 1939–2023

Thomas Avery Hays (October 3, 1929 – May 13, 2023) was an American guitarist, band leader and vocalist; and was one of the last living members of the great musicians who created The Bakersfield Sound.

Hays started playing the guitar in church when he was 10 years old. He performed on the Billy Mize TV Show, Cousin Herb Show, was a member of the house band for the Lucky Spot and the Blackboard and had his own radio show on KMPC. Tommy played on stage with many of the old timers who were part of creating the Bakersfield Sound. Tommy was in the band that gave Buck Owens his first gig, with Dusty Rhodes, at a bar called the Roundup.

Hays had been playing in the honky-tonks in and around Bakersfield for over fifty years. Recognized as one of the original “Bakersfield Sound” pioneers, he helped forge this definitive sound. Driven by the piano, steel and Telecaster guitar, the Bakersfield Sound was a reaction to the early ‘50s and ‘60s sweetening of country music epitomized by the Nashville Sound.

Along with the Western Swingsters which also included Big Bill Wilkerson, he released the CD 60 Years of Western Swing in 2006.

Hays was inducted into the Western Swing Society Hall of Fame in 2010.

Hays lived in Bakersfield, California, and played locally until his death on May 13, 2023, at the age of 93.

== Discography ==
- 60 Years of Western Swing (2006)
