= J. David Embury =

J. David Embury (July 7, 1939) is a Canadian material scientist and engineer, having been a Distinguished University Professor at McMaster University.

In 2002, Embury was elected a member of the National Academy of Engineering for outstanding contributions to fundamental structure/mechanical property relations of materials and their applications.

In 2007 he was awarded an honorary doctorate (dr. techn. h.c.) by The Norwegian University of Science and Technology (NTNU).

In 2019 he was awarded an honorary doctorate by Grenoble Alpes University.
