= Psychotraumatology =

Branch of psychology dealing with study and effects of psychological trauma

Psychotraumatology is the study of psychological trauma. Specifically, this discipline is involved with researching, preventing, and treating traumatic situations and people's reactions to them. It focuses on the study and treatment of post-traumatic stress disorder (PTSD) and acute stress disorder (ASD), but encompasses any adverse reaction after experiencing traumatic events, including dissociative disorders. Since 2021, Certified Trauma Professionals who have achieved a major level of training and clinical expertise can use the abbreviation PsyT after their names as a standard of recognition in the trauma field.

== History ==
The emergence of psychotraumatology as a field begins with the legitimization of PTSD as a psychological disorder. Symptoms of PTSD have been continuously reported in the context of war since the 6th century B.C., but it was not officially recognized as a valid disorder until it finally classified by the American Psychiatric Association (APA) in 1980. Once it was officially recognized as an issue, clinical research on PTSD increased dramatically, giving way to the field of psychotraumatology. The term "psychotraumatology" was coined by George S. Everly Jr. and Jeffrey M. Lating in the text entitled "Psychotraumatology" (1995).

Donovan (1991) suggested that the term traumatology be used to unite the various endeavors within the field of traumatic stress studies. As Donovan notes, however, the term traumatology also denotes the branch of medicine that deals with wounds and serious injuries. Schnitt (1993) expressed concern over Donovan's choice of a term that has at least two meanings. He urged clarity of communications as this new field expands; indeed, expansion is often built upon and facilitated by clarity of communications fostered by sematic precision. In a rebuttal of sorts, Donovan (1993) argued for a term broader in scope than traumatic stress studies, the phrase that has been used historically to unite the field. Clearly Schnitt's (1993) commentary offers insight to be considered. There is significant potential for ambiguity in the use of traumatology as a unifying term for the field of psychological trauma. Donovan (1993) argues that the term is "socially influential as well as conceptually and pragmatically useful" (p. 41 0). The potential ambiguity serves to diminish the promised pragmatics, but the lack of sematic precision is easily corrected.

In 1995, the addition of the prefix psycho- to the root traumatology appears to clarify potential ambiguities and more clearly defines the conduct at hand. Such reasoning serves as the foundation for the choice of psychotraumatology as the title of this field published in the Volume of Psychotraumatology.

There are three main categories that are looked at in psychotrauamatology: the factors before, during, and after a psychologically traumatizing event has occurred. Such factors include:

1. Factors examined before traumatizing event
  - Personal developmental history
  - Familial history (inclusive of both birth parents and primary guardians)
  - Predisposing personality factors
  - Occupational, behavioral and psychiatric risk factors
  - Predisposing psychological states
2. Factors examined about traumatizing event
  - Environmental, interpersonal, situational, and biological factors
3. Factors examined after traumatizing event
  - Psychological responses to trauma
  - Central nervous system, systemic pathophysiological, behavioral and psychophysiological effects from previous conditions

== Trauma professionals specialization ==
The term psychotraumatology is used in the present context to define or order the conduct of inquiry and the categorization of information relevant to psychological trauma. Psychotraumatology may be defined as the study of psychological trauma; more specifically, the study of the processes and factors that lie (a) antecedent to, (b) concomitant with, and (c) subsequent to psychological traumatization (Everly, 1992; 1993).

Since the adoption of new evidence-based models in trauma treatment a new specialization in psychotherapy has emerged, the psychotraumatologist.

According to the International Psychotraumatology Association, the Psychotraumatologist's standard of education and ethics:

A Licensed Clinical Psychotherapist or Psychiatrist with knowledge and training:

- Neurobiology & Neuroscience of Complex Trauma and Dissociation
  - Expanded knowledge of the science & applicability of Porges' Polyvagal Theory
  - Neuroplasticity & Neural Networks
  - Psychopharmacology – trauma specific
- Traumatic or Disorganized Attachment
  - Styles/strategies/stages of attachment
  - Symptoms of traumatic attachment
  - Lack of attachment
  - Neglect
- Dissociation, (“fragmentation”) and working with parts of self
- Adaptations to complex trauma and/or managing co-morbidities inclusive of extreme symptoms: selfinjury, suicide, dissociation, numbing, process and substance addictions, eating disordered behavior, chronic, intractable depression, hyper/hypo sexuality, rage
- Reframing the symptoms (survival resources or appreciating the protective function of trauma symptoms)
- Therapist reactions and managing the therapeutic process:
  - Countertransference redefined (exploring the parts of the therapist that can get activated while working with complex trauma clients)
  - Therapeutic boundaries
  - Self-care for the therapist
- Phase-Oriented Treatment
  - Phase I: Safety & Stabilization (development of therapeutic alliance), skills building (DBT skills: mindfulness, emotion regulation, distress tolerance and interpersonal effectiveness that bring client back into the window of tolerance)
    - Sensorimotor Psychotherapy
    - IFS
    - YST
    - Neurosequential Models
    - Polivagal Therapy
    - Neurofeedback
  - Phase II: Trauma Processing Modalities. Compare and contrast the following treatment approaches, including both pros and cons and risks and limitations with an emphasis on any restrictions or cautions when working with complex and dissociative clients. Only are recognized as efficient and valid these Evidence Based Trauma Treatment Models:
    - EMDR
    - Internal Family Systems
    - DBR
    - MDMA-assisted therapy for Complex PTSD *(The FDA gave the Breakthrough therapy designation and it legal use is only available in the USA)
  - Phase III: Reintegration into larger systems/mourning/meaning-making/Self.
    - Internal Family Systems
    - EMDR
    - The Self Care Scale
    - Contextual Therapies

== Professional bodies and resources ==
Numerous professional organizations promote research, training, and clinical practice standards in psychotraumatology. Examples include the International Society for Traumatic Stress Studies (ISTSS) and the European Society for Traumatic Stress Studies (ESTSS). These bodies provide conferences, publications, and guidelines for practitioners worldwide.

The International Psychotrauma Institute (former IATP) functions as a global governing body for professional standards in psychotraumatology, offering certification, education, and the dissemination of best practices. IPTrauma publishes the "Handbook of Psychotraumatology", considered a core compendium of foundational and advanced knowledge in the field, covering trauma science, clinical interventions, and policy frameworks. The organization's website, iptrauma.org, also provides resources and educational materials for clinicians, researchers, and the public. Topics addressed include trauma, psychotrauma, complex trauma, developmental trauma, and childhood trauma.

== Sub-specializations ==
There are three main sub-specializations in the psychotraumatology field:

1. Dissociation Specialist
2. Childhood Trauma or Developmental Trauma
3. Complex PTSD or PTSD-C

== Notable psychotraumatologists ==
- Judith L. Herman
- Bessel van der Kolk
- Onno van der Hart
- Gabor Maté
- Stephen Porges
- Colin A. Ross
- Vedat Şar
- Marlene Steinberg
- Peter A. Levine
- Francine Shapiro
- Rachel Yehuda
- Janina Fisher

== See also ==
- International Association of Trauma Professionals
- International Society for the Study of Trauma and Dissociation
- American Psychiatric Association
- American Psychological Association
