= Ruth Lingford =

Independent animator and faculty member at Harvard University

- Born: 20 May 1953 (age 73); London, England
- Education: BA in fine arts and art history at Middlesex Polytechnic, MA at the Royal College of Art, Honorary Doctor of Arts from University of Wolverhampton
- Occupations: Animator, senior lecturer, occupational therapist (former)

Ruth Lingford is an English independent animator. Since 2005, she has taught at the Harvard University. She now holds a position as faculty member in the visual and environmental studies, where she is senior lecturer and director of undergraduate studies. She previously taught at the Royal College of Art and the National Film and Television School, UK. Before investing herself in animation, she was an occupational therapist working with the elders and people suffering from mental disorders. Lingford completed a BA in fine arts and art history at the Middlesex Polytechnic (Middlesex University) from 1987 to 1990 and a MA at the Royal College of Art until 1992. In 2008, she received an honorary Doctor of Arts degree from the University of Wolverhampton.

Lingford currently has official Vimeo and YouTube channels where she has uploaded clips of her short films and entire projects.

== Animation work ==
=== Early work ===
Lingford began her work in animation when she made Baggage and Crumble (both 1992) as part of her MA. Baggage and Crumble circulated in some film festivals, after their debut at the Royal College of Art's graduation show, including the Animafest Zagreb, Holland Animation Film Festival and the Clermont-Ferrand International Short Film Festival. After their limited festival run, and struggles to find stability, Lingford made What She Wants (1994) with funding of a grant from the Animate! programme (co-founded by Dick Arnall for the Arts Council of England/Channel 4). For What She Wants, Lingford resorted to use her Amiga 1500 computer – having no access to animation equipments –, doing individual frames on Deluxe Paint. Lingford had learnt rudimentary usage of the computer in a workshop at the RCA, when hand-drawn animation remained the dominant technique. What She Wants's individual images were saved across approximately 20 Floppy disks.

=== Death and the Mother and other acclaimed works ===
On her next project, Lingford was invited at the Museum of the Moving Image, for an "unusual" residency. Developing a second commission for Channel 4, Death and the Mother (1997), Lingford returned again to her rudimentary methods of computer animation. The creative process, however, would take place in full view of the people navigating through the museum: Lingford would be working in a glass room. The film drew inspiration from German expressionist woodcut, and catapulted Lingford on the international animation scene. Upon completion, in 1997, Death and the Mother won many awards, including one at Annecy International Animated Film Festival of the same year. The surface, content and reputation of Death and the Mother drew attention to Lingford from Orly Yadin and Sylvie Bringas. She was asked to collaborate on their project, Silence (1998), where Lingford would be working along Tim Webb on the animation of Silence's sequence. Lingford worked on the first half of the film, which takes place in an animated Theresienstadt, while Webb worked on the second half, which takes place in Sweden. On Silence, she returned to Deluxe Paint to draw preliminary images which were finished by Yadin. Overall, the visuals she helped build in Silence won several important awards including: the Gold Hugo for Animation Short at the 1998 Chicago International Film Festival and the Grand Prix of the 1999 Odense Film Festival.

Lingford's following project, Pleasures of War, of the same year, moved against "the 'plastic' gloss-orientation of much computer-generated imagery". Perhaps due to the success of Silence, she approached novelist and Christian theologian Sara Maitland, who Lingford remembered for her short story "The Swallow and the Nightingale" (from her Far North and Other Dark Tales collection). Pleasures of War was scripted by Maitland, who also collaborated on the general design of the work, based on the deuterocanonical Book of Judith – a story in which two women bargain sexual favors to protect their city from besiegers. Within the film is collaged newsreel from armed conflicts around the world and the victims of these conflicts.

=== From the 2000s onward ===
The Old Fools (2002) was Ruth Lingford's following project, again, commissioned by Channel 4. It is an adaptation of the Philip Larkin's homonymous poem – written while her mother was in a nursing home. In terms of style, The Old Fools marks a departure from Lingford's computer-drawn evocative imagery; its aesthetics, rather combining DV footage, are drawings and typography animated in After Effects and Painter. With the Shynola collective, Lingford worked next on a music video for the music band Unkle, An Eye for an Eye (2002). The collaboration was successful, and remained inlined with Lingford's previous imagery: "a sublimely creepy evocation of the biological drives and desires". Lingford also collaborated on a fellow Harvard professors' film: Secrecy (2008), where her animated sequences served "to create a contrast between imaginary and literal realms of the secrecy system". Likewise, she animated sequences from another film – We Still Live Here: Âs Nutayuneân (2010) – by Anne Makepeace.

Little Deaths (2010), Lingford's latest standalone work, begun after she received a 2008–09 Harvard Film Study Center Fellowship. In the pre-production process, she wanted to 'interview' people about their orgasms. Lingford recalled she expected her interviewees to lack proper words to describe their private experiences, but they did not. She used their commentary, in "celebrat[ing] key aspects of our experience that are often suppressed", and continued to develop her experimental aesthetic of animation "to evoke the elusive physical and emotional experience of orgasm".

Lingford has been part of the band What Time Is It, Mr. Fox? for whom she animated the song "The Ladies' Tree", and sang as a back vocalist.

== Filmography ==
As Director
Title	Release date	Based on	Runtime
Little Deaths	2010		11:58
UNKLE: Eye for an Eye	2002		6:30
The Old Fools	2002	The Old Fools by Philip Larkin	5:40
Pleasures of War	1998	Book of Judith	11:00
What She Wants	1994		5:00
Crumble	1992		4:00
Baggage	1992		4:17
Death and the Mother	1997	The Story of a Mother by Hans Christian Andersen	10:37

Contributions
Title	Release date	Directed by	Role
We Still Live Here: Âs Nutayuneân	2010	Anne Makepeace	Animator
Secrecy	2008	Peter Galison, Robb Moss	Animator
Silence	1998	Orly Yadin, Sylvie Bringas	Animator

Series Title	Episode Title	Season	Episode	Release date	Directed by	Role
The World of Peter Rabbit and Friends	The Tale of Samuel Whiskers, or the Roly-Poly Pudding	1	2	1993	Mike Stuart, Dianne Jackson	Rendering artist

Appeared In
Series Title	Episode Title	Season	Episode	Release Date
Animation Nation	Visions of Childhood	1	3	2005
