= Caroline Jones (disambiguation) =

Caroline Jones (born 1990) is an American country singer.

Caroline Jones may also refer to:

- Caroline Jones (broadcaster) (1938–2022), Australian journalist
- Caroline Jones (fundraiser) (born 1968), English charity volunteer
- Caroline Jones (politician) (1955–2026), Welsh politician; Member of the Senedd
- Caroline A. Jones (born 1954), American art historian
- Caroline R. Jones (1942–2001), American advertising executive
- Caroline Chisholm (née Jones, 1808–1877), English humanitarian
- Caroline Quentin (born 1960 as Jones), English actress and presenter

== See also ==
- Caroline Billingham (Caroline Billingham-Jones, born 1967), British tennis player
- Caroline Wickham-Jones (1955–2022), British archaeologist
- Carol Lynley (Carole Ann Jones, 1942–2019), American actress
- Caroline John (1940–2012), English actress who played Liz Shaw on Doctor Who
- Carolyn Jones (disambiguation)
