= International Society for the Study of Trauma and Dissociation =

Nonprofit professional organization in the U.S.

The International Society for the Study of Trauma and Dissociation (ISSTD) is a nonprofit professional organization of health professionals and individuals interested in advancing the scientific and societal understandings of trauma-based disorders, including posttraumatic stress disorder, complex posttraumatic stress disorder, complex trauma, and the dissociative disorders.

While serving as a platform for discussion and understanding of these topics, the ISSTD has also attracted attention and criticism regarding its promotion of controversial treatments and conspiracy theories, such as discredited theories of government mind control related to hypnosis and unsubstantiated claims of satanic ritual abuse.

== Profile ==
In the 1980s, the ISSMP&D, the International Society for the Study of Multiple Personality and Dissociation, grouped clinicians and researchers primarily interested in Multiple Personality Disorder (MPD). In 1995 the ISSMP&D was renamed the International Society for the Study of Dissociation (ISSD), and in 2006 the ISSD became the ISSTD, to better describe the society's focus.

The ISSTD hosts annual conferences as well as regional conferences. It also offers different webinars, workshops, special interest groups (SIGs), training programs and online communities specific to subtopics related to the field of trauma and dissociation. Editors of the book Dissociation and the dissociative disorders: DSM-V and beyond describe the ISSTD as "the principal professional organization devoted to dissociation".

The ISSMP&D's original journal, Dissociation: Progress in the Dissociative Disorders ceased operation after 39 issues (March 1988-December 1997), though its full-text contents have since been made available online. This was replaced by the Journal of Trauma & Dissociation, with the goal of placing the journal under more direct oversight. This peer-reviewed journal is published five times per year. Via this and other publications, the ISSTD has published guidelines for the treatment of dissociative identity disorder in both adults and children These guidelines are often referenced in the field as a basic starting point for psychotherapy with highly dissociative clients.

== History ==
In 1982, the steering committee for the founding of the ISSTD, at time of founding called the International Society for the Study of Multiple Personality (ISSMP), was organized by George Greaves. The organization gained traction from Myron Boor, Bennett Braun, David Caul, Jane Dubrow, George Greaves, Richard Kluft, Frank Putnam and Roberta Sachs, a group of physicians and psychologists present at the 1983 American Psychiatric Association conference.

In 1984, the ISSMP's first annual conference was held. Conferences were originally co-sponsored by The American Society of Clinical Hypnosis. The US-based ISSTD was officially formed in 1984 under the name of the International Society for the Study of Multiple Personality and Dissociation but changed to the International Society for the Study of Dissociation in 1994 and then to its current name in November 2006.

=== Presidents ===
- George B. Greaves (1983–1984)
- Bennett Braun (1984–1985)
- Richard Kluft (1985–1986)
- George B. Greaves (1986–1987)
- David Caul (1987–1988)
- Philip Coons (1988–1989)
- Walter C. Young (1989–1990)
- Catherine Fine (1990–1991)
- Richard Loewenstein (1991–1992)
- Moshe S. Torem (1992–1993)
- Colin A. Ross (1993–1994)
- Nancy L. Hornstein (1994–1995)
- Elizabeth S. Bowman (1995–1996)
- James A. Chu (1996–1997)
- Marlene E. Hunter (1997–1998)
- Peter M. Barach (1998–1999)
- John Curtis (1999–2000)
- Joy Silberg (2000–2001)
- Steven Frankel (2001–2002)
- Richard A. Chefetz (2002–2003)
- Steven Gold (2003–2004)
- Frances S. Waters (2004–2005)
- Eli Somer (2005–2006)
- Catherine Classen (2006–2007)
- Vedat Şar (2007–2008)
- Kathy Steele (2008–2009)
- Paul F. Dell (2010–2011)
- Thomas G. Carlton (2011–2012)
- Joan Turkus (2012–2013)
- Philip J. Kinsler (2013–2014)
- Lynette S. Danylchuk (2015)
- Warwick Middleton (2016)
- Martin Dorahy (2017)
- Kevin Connors (2018)
- Christine Forner (2019)
- Christa Krüger (2020)
- Rosita Cortizo (2021)
- Lisa Danylchuk (2022)
- Michael Salter (2023)
- Peter Maves (2024)
- Michael Coy (2025)
- Abigail Percifield (2026)

== Controversies ==
Starting in the 1980s, controversies involving the ISSTD and surrounding repressed memory and the possible connections between child abuse, traumatic events, memory and dissociation arose.

Some mental health professionals who used hypnosis and other memory recovery techniques now known to contribute to the creation of false memories found their patients lodging bizarre accusations - including of satanic ritual abuse, sacrificial murder, and cannibalism - against their parents, family members and prominent community members. This era is now considered a moral panic, colloquially referred to as the "Satanic Panic." The ISSTD has been accused of significantly influencing the creation of the panic.

There have been concerns that psychotherapists using ISSTD guidelines might cause harm by inducing beliefs in alter personalities and create false memories. However, proponents argue that critics misrepresent data or misused anecdotes, and reviews of controlled studies show no evidence for this, instead demonstrating substantial evidence of benefit from using ISSTD guidelines.

=== Fringe beliefs and conference topics ===
The ISSTD has promoted multiple different discredited conspiracy theories including satanic ritual abuse and government mind control programming.

From 1984 to 1987, conferences included fringe topics such as cult-created alter personalities, an alleged case of stigmata in an MPD patient, and discussions of alleged occult practices.

In 1988, one of the ISSMP&D founders Bennett Braun presented a workshop in Chicago at an ISSMP&D conference linking the diagnosis of multiple personality disorder (now dissociative identity disorder) to abuse at the hands of devil-worshiping cults. Claims have been made that his presentation included notions of widespread Satanic cults, internally organized with a structure similar to communist cells, with local regional, distinct, national and international councils. These claims also included details that the cults were transgenerational family traditions that had been conducted in secret for at least 2000 years. Braun has challenged these claims, alleging that they rely on remarks which misrepresent his actual statements made at the conference. Another presentation at the 1988 conference aimed to verify alleged historical accounts of Satanic cults engaging in cannibalism and human sacrifice.

In 1989, ISSMP&D's annual conference included presentations on Manchurian candidates, a discredited conspiracy theory concerning alleged trained assassins trained to perform via hypnotic cue, multiple personality in toddlers, and performing exorcisms.

From 1993 onward, conferences featured topics concerned with increasing forensic and legal scrutiny into the field's practice concerning the creation of false memories and use of clinical hypnosis. Despite growing skepticism and a lengthy investigative report published by the FBI in 1992 refuting claims of widespread, organized Satanic cults, presentations on fringe topics such as satanic ritual abuse continued into the late 2000s including topics such as demonic alter personalities. Conference presentations included science denial in the form of a presentation addressing false memory as a "myth".

In 2008, the ISSTD developed a special interest group, the Ritual Abuse and Mind Control Special Interest Group (RAMCOA SIG). ISSTD cofounder, Richard Kluft, wrote in 2014 that he believed that the vast majority of Satanic ritual assault reports were not credible, though abusers may employ satanic elements for intimidation or other ends. "I remain troubled about the matter of transgenerational satanic cults. Any scientist or thinker has had to grapple with how difficult it is to prove that something does not exist. I am comfortable in saying that if such situations exist, they exist at a level of far less frequency than was once suspected. [...] I prefer honest uncertainty to false conviction."

Approaching the 2020s, presentations continued to include conspiratorial topics, such as "key dates" and "occult holidays" (including Halloween and Christmas) purported to inspire ritual abuse perpetrated by Satanic cults. In 2019, Michael Salter, who would become president of the ISSTD in 2023, delivered a presentation that included the promotion of the debunked conspiracy theory that there were tunnels found under McMartin Preschool, in reference to the McMartin preschool trial.

=== Misconduct by founders and presidents ===
In 1994, past ISSTD president George Greaves' license was revoked by the state of Georgia for engaging in sexual intercourse with patients, sexual contact with his patients while they were under hypnosis, and numerous other ethical violations.

In 1995, ISSTD's founder and former president, Bennett Braun, was sued by a former patient who claimed that Braun had falsely convinced her that she'd engaged in Satanic rituals, cannibalism, and infanticide. The patient received a $10.6 million settlement. Braun's medical license was temporarily suspended by Illinois state officials in 1999 and he was expelled from the American Psychiatric Association in March 2000.

In 2004, another former patient of Braun's, Elizabeth Gale, filed a lawsuit against Braun and Roberta Sachs, another ISSTD founder, alleging that they and their colleagues convinced Gale "that her family indoctrinated her as a child so she would make babies for sacrifice in a satanic cult." The settlement in the malpractice suit amounted to $7.5 million.

Former ISSTD president Colin Ross has also been accused by former patients of implanting false memories, including of satanic ritual abuse. Roma Hart accused Ross of convincing her, among other things, that she was forcibly impregnated by aliens and later gave birth to a half-alien, half-human hybrid. Another former patient, Martha Ann Tyo, sued Ross and others in 1998, alleging that the defendants' methods led her to believe her family was part of an "extended, transgenerational satanic cult."

In January 2021, former ISSTD president and cofounder Bennett Braun's license was revoked an additional time by the state of Montana in addition to the previous revocation from the state of Illinois. The decision of the state of Montana to license Braun elicited legal action and criticism.

In April 2023, the ISSTD issued a statement addressing the removal of a member of the Board of Directors. The statement alleged a "serious and undeclared conflict of interest" which presented a "direct risk". The statement referenced social media posts authored by the removed Board member and addresses them as allegedly false. In response, claims made on social media by the member accuse the ISSTD — particularly then-president Michael Salter — of alleged bullying, ostracization within the organization, and making accusations of an alleged "psyop" run by the removed member of the Board.

=== Organizational and structural issues ===
In 1990, the ISSTD annual conference featured a panel on the topic of skepticism of satanic ritual abuse. Panelists who presented skeptical viewpoints claimed that they were accused of being secret Satanists by ISSTD members. One panelist, a founding ISSTD member alleged there was a "shouting match" and that he was physically intimidated. Around 1992, a task force was set up within the organization to "negotiate peace between cult-believers and cult-skeptics". However, despite the formation of this task force, scheduled meetings aimed at fostering peace talks failed to materialize.

After years of controversy, between 1993 and 1998, the ISSTD entered what 1999 president Peter Barach called a "crisis". Between 1993 and 1998 approximately half of the membership population ceased affiliation with the organization. In 1998, the society's journal, Dissociation, ceased publication. By 1999 staff were laid off.

In October 2020, the ISSTD Board of Directors issued a letter to membership informing them that the special interest group formerly known as RAMCOA SIG (Ritual Abuse, Mind Control and Organized Abuse Special Interest Group) had been renamed due to "stricter rules for the provision of Continuing Education (CE) and Continuing Medical Education (CME) credits", largely due to growing concerns about the organization's presentations which included sensationalized and controversial statements regarding "mind control." The new name for this group is "Organized and Extreme Abuse SIG".

In December 2020, internal documents and forum posts from the ISSTD were posted online by The Satanic Temple (TST) which has publicly criticized the organization. TST spokesperson and cofounder Lucien Greaves commented on TST's motivations behind the release, stating the ISSTD represented a "clear and present threat to mental health consumers".

== See also ==
- Recovered memory therapy
- APA Task Force on Deceptive and Indirect Methods of Persuasion and Control

== Sources ==
- Chu, James A. (2011). Rebuilding Shattered Lives. John Wiley & Sons. ISBN 978-0-470-76874-7.
- Hacking, Ian (1998). Rewriting the Soul: Multiple Personality and the Sciences of Memory. Princeton University Press. ISBN 0-691-05908-X.
