= Stranger in the Mirror =

Stranger in the Mirror may refer to:

- A Stranger in the Mirror, 1976 novel by Sidney Sheldon
- The Stranger in the Mirror: Dissociation – The Hidden Epidemic, 2001 book by Marlene Steinberg and Maxine Schnall

== See also ==
- Stranger in My Mirror
