= Carolyn Jones (disambiguation) =

Carolyn Jones (1930–1983) was an American actress.

Carolyn Jones may also refer to:

- Carolyn Jones (British actress) (1941–2018), British actress played Sharon Metcalfe on Crossroads from 1977 to 1984
- Carolyn Jones (politician) (born 1944), Canadian member of the Legislative Assembly of Saskatchewan
- Carolyn Jones (filmmaker) (born 1957), American director, writer, producer and photographer
- Carolyn Jones, American winner of the 1977 National Sweetheart beauty pageant
- Carolyn Jones-Young (née Jones, born 1969), American basketball player

== See also ==
- Carol Lynley (Carole Ann Jones, 1942–2019), American actress
- Carolyn Johns, Australian member of the musical comedy trio The Kransky Sisters
- Caroline Jones (disambiguation)
