= The Bend in the River =

2025 American documentary film

- Directed by: Robb Moss
- Produced by: Lisa Remington; Kristin Feeley
- Edited by: Jeff Malmberg
- Release date: 2025
- Running time: 83 minutes
- Country: United States
- Language: English

The Bend in the River is a 2025 American documentary film directed by Robb Moss. The film is the third film of a trilogy which follows a group of friends. The film premiered at the Telluride Film Festival on August 30, 2025. In May 2026, Netflix acquired distribution rights to the documentary, scheduling it for a streaming release on December 4, 2026. The film was executive-produced by Frances McDormand and Joel Coen.
