= Stanford school =

Group of philosophers of science

The Stanford school (humorously also called the Stanford Disunity Mafia) is a group of philosophers of science, the members of which taught at various times at Stanford University, who share an intellectual tradition of arguing against the unity of science.

These criticisms draw heavily from research on science as a social and cultural process as well as arguments regarding ontological and methodological plurality found in different scientific fields. This group includes Nancy Cartwright, John Dupré, Peter Galison, Ian Hacking and Patrick Suppes. A notable position put forward by members of the Stanford school is entity realism.

A major conference with all the original members (except Hacking) plus original scientific collaborators, parallel philosophers, and the next generation of philosophers in this vein took place on Stanford's Campus on October 25–26, 2013.

== See also ==
- Contextualism
- Ontological pluralism
- Methodological pluralism
- Pittsburgh school
