= Casimir Lewy =

Polish British philosopher

Casimir Lewy FBA
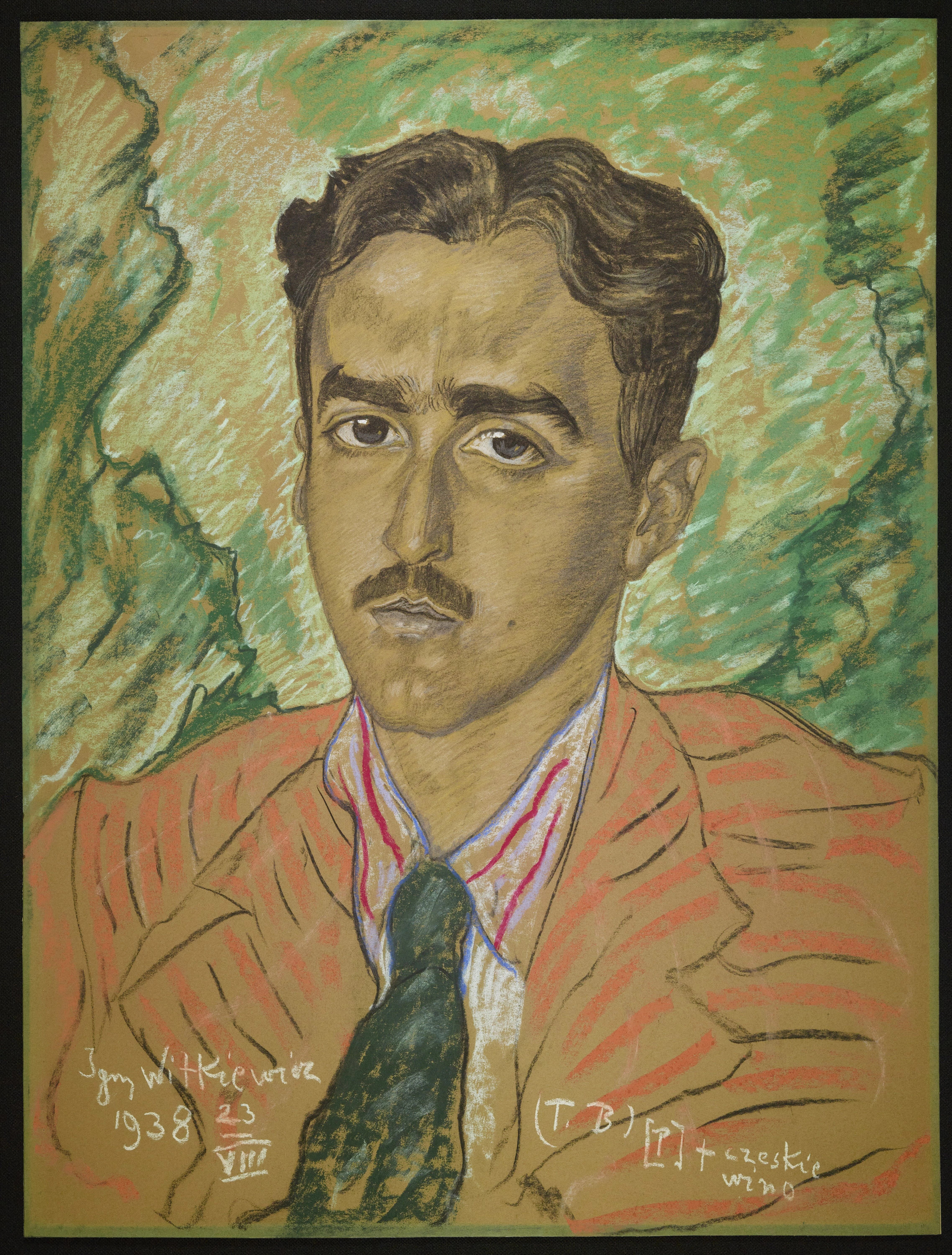
- 1938 pastel drawing by Stanisław Ignacy Witkiewicz
- Born: Kazimierz Lewy; 26 February 1919; Warsaw, Second Polish Republic
- Died: 8 February 1991 (aged 71); Cambridge, England

Education
- Education: Fitzwilliam College, Cambridge (PhD, 1943)
- Thesis: Some philosophical considerations about the survival of death (1943)
- Doctoral advisor: G. E. Moore
- Other advisor: Ludwig Wittgenstein

Philosophical work
- Era: Contemporary philosophy
- Region: Western philosophy
- School: Analytic
- Institutions: Trinity College, Cambridge
- Doctoral students: Simon Blackburn, Ian Hacking
- Notable students: Edward Craig, Crispin Wright
- Main interests: Philosophical logic (modal logic)
- Notable ideas: The notion of truth as a property of propositions being prior to the notion of truth as a property of sentences

Casimir Lewy (/ˈlɛvi/; Polish: Kazimierz Lewy [ˈlɛvɨ]; 26 February 1919 – 8 February 1991) was a Polish philosopher of Jewish descent.

He worked in philosophical logic but published scantly. He was an influential teacher; several of his students went on to be prominent philosophers, including Simon Blackburn, Edward Craig, Ian Hacking, and Crispin Wright.

== Life ==
His father, Ludwig Lewy, was a doctor and died in 1919 when he was an infant, so he grew up with his mother Izabela's family. After nine years at the Mikolaj Rej school in Warsaw, he travelled to the UK in 1936 with the intention of improving his English. He was admitted to Fitzwilliam House, Cambridge, that year to read Philosophy, supervised by John Wisdom, and graduated in 1939 aged twenty with first-class honours in Part II of the Tripos. He had already published four short articles in the journal Analysis. A doctoral student of G. E. Moore to 1943, he attended lectures by Ludwig Wittgenstein from the late 1930s until 1945. He received his PhD from Cambridge in 1943, with a thesis entitled Some philosophical considerations concerning the survival of death. During this period, the international situation, as well as the political situation in Poland was rapidly deteriorating. Lewy spent most of the Long Vacation of 1938 in Poland, returning to Cambridge just before the Munich crisis. But it was not until Germany invaded Poland in 1939 that he realized he would not be able to return to his native country. Most of his relatives were murdered in the Holocaust.

Remaining in the UK, he taught at the University of Liverpool, and then from 1952 at Cambridge as a University Lecturer. He also helped Moore as an assistant editor of the journal Mind while Moore was lecturing in the United States, and he participated in meetings of the Moral Sciences Club. He taught at the Faculty of Moral Science in Cambridge in the years 1943–45. He was a Fellow of Trinity College, Cambridge from 1958. He became a Fellow of the British Academy in 1980.

According to his student Ian Hacking, "He had early acquired the conviction that one should publish only when one got something absolutely right, so he left very little in print." Hacking also wrote, in his 2014 book Why is there philosophy of mathematics at all (p.260), "... Lewy's man was G.E. Moore, of whom he became the literary executor, and from whom he learned to be a `careful analytic philosopher'."

In a 2009 interview with Alan Macfarlane, Cambridge philosopher Simon Blackburn said of Lewy: "At Cambridge the great influence on all of us in Trinity was Casimir Lewy; he was a Polish Jew who had left Germany just in time before the Second World War. He lost either all or nearly all of his family; he was a charismatic teacher with an enormous influence on a whole generation of philosophy students in Trinity—Ian Hacking, Edward Craig and myself, Crispin Wright—many of us became academics." A Festschrift, Exercises in Analysis by Students of Casimir Lewy shows his influence on many Cambridge philosophers that he taught.

The Casimir Lewy Library of the Philosophy Faculty at the University of Cambridge is named after him.

== Selected publications ==
For a full listing of published papers, book reviews and critical notices see: Casimir Lewy's papers.

=== Books ===
- Meaning and Modality, Cambridge University Press, 1976.

=== Papers ===
- Lewy, Casimir (October 1937). "Some Remarks on Analysis". Analysis. 6 (1): 1–5. doi:10.2307/3326883. JSTOR 3326883.
- Lewy, Casimir (May 1938). "A Note on Empirical Propositions". Analysis. 5 (3/4): 51–55. doi:10.2307/3327015. JSTOR 3327015.
- Lewy, Casimir (September 1939). "On the "Justification" of Induction". Analysis. 6 (5/6): 87–90. doi:10.2307/3326791. JSTOR 3326791.
- Lewy, Casimir (December 1939). "Some Notes on Assertion". Analysis. 7 (1): 20–24. doi:10.2307/3326293. JSTOR 3326293.
- "Logical Necessity". The Philosophical Review. 49 (1): 62–68. January 1940.
- Lewy, C. (1942–43). "Is the Notion of Disembodied Existence Self-Contradictory?". Proceedings of the Aristotelian Society. 43: 59–78. doi:10.1093/aristotelian/43.1.59. JSTOR 4544375.
- Lewy, C. (July 1946). "Equivalence and Identity". Mind. 55 (219): 223–233. doi:10.1093/mind/LV.219.223. JSTOR 2250732.
- Lewy, C. (July 1967). "A Note on the Text of the Tractatus". Mind. 76 (303): 416–423. doi:10.1093/mind/LXXVI.303.416. JSTOR 2251849.
- Lewy, C. (January 1976). "Mind under G. E. Moore (1921-1947)". Mind. 85 (337): 37–46. doi:10.1093/mind/LXXXV.337.37. JSTOR 2253253.

== See also ==
- List of Poles (philosophers)
