= The Same River Twice =

2003 American documentary film

- Directed by: Robb Moss
- Release date: 2003
- Language: English

The Same River Twice is a 2003 film by Robb Moss, described by the Sundance Channel as follows: "in 1978, filmmaker Robb Moss joined 16 free-spirited friends for a month-long rafting trip down the Colorado River. The excursion was captured in a short film, Riverdogs, a visual celebration of naked, exuberant youth set against the spectacular vistas of the Grand Canyon. A quarter-century later Moss tracks down five of his old comrades for a witty and insightful now-and-then portrait to see how they have fared after coping with children, careers, responsibilities, ageing and changing attitudes." Two of the five are Jeff Golden and Cathy Shaw, shown in the 1970s as a young couple in love, and then in 2000, divorced with two children. The film debuted at the Sundance Film Festival in 2003 and was nominated for two awards, the Truer Than Fiction Award at the Independent Spirit Awards in 2004 and the Grand Jury Prize.

The title refers to a saying "you cannot step into the same river twice", which dates to Ancient Greek times.

The Same River Twice won Best Documentary at the Birmingham Sidewalk Moving Picture Festival in 2003 and Best Documentary Feature at the Nashville Film Festival in 2003.
