= George S. Everly Jr. =

American psychologist

- Born: May 31, 1950 (age 76)
- Occupations: Psychologist, academic, author
- Employer(s): Loyola University Maryland, Johns Hopkins University School of Medicine, Johns Hopkins Bloomberg School of Public Health
- Organizations: International Critical Incident Stress Foundation
- Known for: Crisis intervention, disaster mental health, human resilience

George S. Everly Jr. (born May 31, 1950) is an American psychologist, academic, and author known for his work in psychological crisis intervention, disaster mental health, and human resilience. He is a co-founder of the International Critical Incident Stress Foundation (ICISF). He currently holds, or has held, academic posts as Professor in Psychology, Professor in Public Health, and associate professor in Psychiatry and Behavioral Sciences Loyola University Maryland, The Johns Hopkins University School of Medicine, and The Johns Hopkins Bloomberg School of Public Health.

== Education and training ==
Everly completed his B.S. in Business administration in 1972, M.A. in Communications in 1974, and PhD in Public health in 1978 degrees at the University of Maryland, College Park. He later undertook specialized fellowship training in behavioral medicine at Harvard University and completed an internship in clinical psychology at Johns Hopkins Homewood Hospital.

== Career ==
Everly was a professor of psychology at Loyola University Maryland from 1985 to 2018. He was on the faculty of Harvard University from 1985 to 1987 and Harvard Medical School from 1987 to 1989. From 2016 to 2024, Everly held a professorship at the Johns Hopkins Bloomberg School of Public Health, and since 2006, he has been a part-time associate professor in the Department of Psychiatry at the Johns Hopkins School of Medicine.

In the late 1980s, together with Jeffrey T. Mitchell, Everly founded the International Critical Incident Stress Foundation (ICISF). In 1997, ICISF was admitted to the United Nations as a non-governmental organization under the auspices of the Economic and Social Council, one of the six principal organs of the United Nations. From 1988 to 1992, Everly served as Chief Psychologist and Director of Behavioral Medicine at the Johns Hopkins Homewood Hospital Center in Baltimore.

Everly was an early developers of psychological first aid and critical incident stress management (CISM). He has served in advisory or honorary roles at the Universidad de Flores (Argentina), Universidad Norbert Wiener (Peru), and the University of Hong Kong.

== Books ==
Everly co-authored over 20 textbooks. With Daniel Girdano, he authored Controlling Stress and Tension (Prentice-Hall), a college stress management textbook in 1977. In 1989, he authored A Clinical Guide to the Treatment of the Human Stress Response (Plenum), a text that integrated the psychophysiology of stress with specific treatment guidelines. Writing with Jeffrey T. Mitchell, Everly wrote Critical Incident Stress Management, a textbook on a comprehensive systems' approach to psychological crisis intervention.

In 1995, Everly co-authored Psychotraumatology with Jeffrey Lating wherein they coined the term. His 2007 book Pastoral Crisis Intervention paved the way for the integration of clergy into disaster mental health response. His 2008 book The Resilient Child (DiaMed) won ForeWord Magazine's gold medal for Book of the Year in Parenting. While on faculty at the Johns Hopkins' Center for Public Health Preparedness, Everly developed the Johns Hopkins' RAPID model of psychological first aid. His book The Johns Hopkins Guide to Psychological First Aid, is published by the Johns Hopkins Press.

=== Selected publications ===
- Lodestar (2024), a USA Today national bestseller
- The Johns Hopkins Guide to Psychological First Aid (2022)
- Stronger: Develop the Resilience You Need to Succeed (2015), named one of the year's top 10 business books by AMACOM
- A Clinical Guide to the Treatment of the Human Stress Response, 4th ed. (2019)
- Critical Incident Stress Management (1997)
- Controlling Stress and Tension (Pearson, multiple editions)

== Honors and awards ==
- The Certificate of Honor from the Baltimore Police Department
