= The Taming of Chance =

1990 book by Ian Hacking

- Cover of the first edition
- Author: Ian Hacking
- Language: English
- Series: Ideas in Context
- Subject: History of probability
- Publisher: Cambridge University Press
- Publication date: 1990
- Publication place: United Kingdom
- Media type: Print (Hardcover and Paperback)
- Pages: 282
- ISBN: 978-0521388849

The Taming of Chance is a 1990 book about probability by the philosopher Ian Hacking.

== Summary ==
The Taming of Chance explores the historical development of probability and its role in shaping modern thought. Ian Hacking examines how the concept of chance evolved from being a philosophical abstraction to a practical tool for understanding and managing uncertainty in various fields, including science, medicine, and social policy. Drawing on Michel Foucault's ideas, Hacking delves into the interplay between statistics, governance, and societal norms, illustrating how probabilistic thinking influenced the emergence of modern institutions and practices.
