= Mad Travelers =

Book by Ian Hacking

- Author: Ian Hacking
- Language: English
- Publisher: University Press of Virginia
- Publication date: 1998
- ISBN: 9780813918235

Mad Travelers: Reflections on the Reality of Transient Mental Illnesses (1998) is a book by the Canadian philosopher of science Ian Hacking. The book provides an historical account of a medical condition that used to be known as fugue or mad travel. Fugue emerged as ‘a specific, diagnosable type of insanity’ (p. 8) in late nineteenth century France and then spread to Italy, Germany and Russia. The book was published in London nu: Free Association Books in, 1999. ISBN 9781853434556

== The disease ==
According to Hacking, the fugue epidemic lasted twenty-two years, from 1887 to 1909. The disease never spread heavily in either Britain or America. It is characterised by a compulsion to travel, which, if fulfilled, manifests itself in impetuous travelling during which the traveller loses sense of their identity. Hacking gives as an example the case of the first officially diagnosed fuguer, Albert Dadas, and describes briefly his symptoms as follows:

In his normal state, at home, in the factory, or as a cook in the army, he was a good worker, timid, respectful, shy with women. He never drank and when he was on a fugue had a particular hostility to alcohol. At home he would have a regular and uneventful life. Then would come about three days of severe headaches, anxiety, sweats, insomnia, masturbation five or six times a night, and then – he would set out.’(p.24).

As Hacking (p. 196) reports, the fugue was introduced as a distinct disorder for the first time in DSM-III (1980) under the name ‘psychogenic fugue’ which was associated with:

1. 'the predominant disturbance is sudden, unexpected travel away from home or ones’ customary place of work, with inability to recall one’s past’
2. ‘confusion about personal identity or assumption of new identity (partial or complete)’
3. ‘the disturbance does not occur exclusively during the course of Dissociative Identity Disorder and is not due to the direct physiological effects of a substance (e.g., a drug of abuse, a medication) or a general medical condition (e.g., temporal lobe epilepsy)’
4. ‘the symptoms cause clinically significant distress or impairment in social, occupational or other important areas of functioning.

Hacking uses Albert Dadas as a case study of what he terms ‘transient mental illness’: ‘an illness that appears at a time and in a place, and later fades away. It may spread from place to place and reappear from time to time. It may be selective for social class or gender, preferring poor women or rich men.’ (p. 1). The concept of a transient mental illness has provoked debates as to whether the condition is real or socially constructed; Hacking, however, does not follow this line of argument but focuses instead on how knowledge, scientific practices and ordinary life in a particular context allow for socially permissible diagnoses and diseases to emerge. To aid his investigation of the major factors which may be involved in the emergence of a disease, Hacking applies the metaphor of an ‘ecological niche’ (p. 2) For a disease to emerge and thrive, it should first fit into the larger taxonomy of illnesses, which in this case is hysteria and epilepsy. Secondly, it should be situated somewhere between some virtuous and vicious elements of contemporary culture, which in this instance is what Hacking calls ‘romantic tourism versus criminal vagrancy’ (p. 81). Thirdly, it should be observable as a disorder – since travellers on the continent were obliged to have identification papers, fuguers could be easily identified and, if necessary, jailed or hospitalised. Fourthly, the disease should provide, alongside all the pain and suffering, some release: during their travels, fuguers could find consolation and escape from the pressures of daily life (p. 82).

Hysteria or Epilepsy?

Whereas Albert Dadas was diagnosed as an hysterical epileptic, Hacking mentions another fuguer, a man called "Mén", who was diagnosed by the prominent French neurologist Jean-Martin Charcot as being epileptic, but not hysterical. Having assumed that fugue is a kind of epilepsy, Charcot treated Mén with potassium bromide. As he said at the time, "This is plainly a special variety of epilepsy. Thanks to the bromide treatment, we have already helped him, and I hope that by the use of the same medication I shall continue to be of service to him" (p. 37). By entering the hysteria-epilepsy debate, fugue was accepted in the contemporary taxonomy of mental illnesses (Hacking’s first condition for the emergence of an ‘ecological niche’). In 1895, in an attempt to solve the debate whether fugue is a kind of hysteria or a kind of epilepsy, Fulgence Raymond investigated all the published cases and concluded that: ‘there were both epileptic and hysterical fugues, with the hysterical ones predominating’ (p. 47). According to Raymond, epileptic fugues were to be treated by chemical means and hysterical ones via hypnosis.

Niches

Hacking discusses why fugue did not spread in either Britain or America. Firstly, he argues, both countries had high rates of emigration – if there were some cases of fugue at all, the fuguers would be unlikely to return and thereby be diagnosed. Secondly, neither Britain nor America had conscript armies during this period. In other countries, such as France, which at the time did have conscription, and thereby their young men were more likely rigorously scrutinised while travelling and, if necessary, jailed or hospitalised (p. 64). Another reason why fugue did not spread in America was that the country did not have a degeneracy programme. France, in contrast, was notorious for low birth rates, vagrancy, insanity and homosexuality - what was at this time perceived as a state of degeneracy. Therefore, according to Hacking, fugue could more easily ‘thrive’ on the continent than in America.
