= Bennett Braun =

American psychiatrist (1940–2024)

Bennett G. Braun (August 7, 1940 – March 20, 2024) was an American psychiatrist known for authoring the DSM3-R definition of multiple personality disorder (now called "dissociative identity disorder") and involvement in promoting the "Satanic Panic", a moral panic around a discredited conspiracy theory that led to thousands of people being wrongfully medically treated or investigated for nonexistent crimes.

Braun was a co-founder of the International Society for the Study of Trauma and Dissociation and founded the Dissociative Disorders Program at the Rush-Presbyterian-St. Luke's Medical Center. Widely accepted as an expert in his field, he was a member of the DSM-III-R advisory committee on dissociative disorders.

In addition, in the 1980s Braun claimed that multiple personality disorder patients can exhibit significantly different health conditions unique to each distinct personality, such as patients requiring several different eyeglasses prescriptions for each personality, or one personality having a disease such as lazy eye, hypertension, color blindness or diabetes which is absent from another, and argued that "[i]f the mind can do this in tearing down body tissue, I think it suggests the same potential for healing."

== Satanic ritual abuse theory ==
In the 1980s, Braun became a leading proponent of the satanic ritual abuse theory, and appeared on TV promoting it. According to this theory, thousands of children were being subjected to organized acts of murder, torture, human sacrifice, cannibalism and sexual abuse throughout America, in elaborate ceremonies performed by Satan-worshippers.

The Satanic Panic lost momentum in the 1990s, as it became clear that the accusations did not stand up to investigation, and that the phenomenon had been a moral panic. A 1994 article in the New York Times stated that extensive investigation had shown that not one case of organized cult abuse was capable of being substantiated by investigating police, out of 12,000 documented accusations nationwide.

In 1993, Braun was sued by former patient Patricia Burgus, who accused Braun of falsely convincing her that she had engaged in satanic rituals, cannibalism, and infanticide. The case resulted in a settlement of $10.6 million. The case made national headline news. Braun subsequently sued his malpractice insurer for settling without his permission.

Braun's medical license was suspended for two years by the State of Illinois in 1999, with the suspension to be followed by a five-year period of probation that would have stopped him from treating multiple personality disorder patients for seven years in total. Braun was expelled from both the Illinois Psychiatric Society and American Psychiatric Association in 2000.

Braun moved to Butte, Montana, and in 2003 the State of Montana granted Braun a medical license, allowing Braun to resume the practice of medicine in that state.

In 2004, another former patient of Braun's, Elizabeth Gale, filed a lawsuit against Braun and another doctor, alleging that they and their colleagues convinced Gale "that her family indoctrinated her as a child so she would make babies for sacrifice in a satanic cult." The settlement in the malpractice suit amounted to $7.5 million.

Braun continued to treat patients in his clinic until 2016, when he partially retired but continued to treat a limited number of patients at his home in Butte. Montana. He relinquished his controlled substances prescribing powers in 2017, before renewing his medical license in 2018.

In January 2021, Braun's Montana medical license was revoked for unprofessional conduct. The decision of the state of Montana to license Braun in 2003 in spite of the previous events elsewhere elicited legal action and criticism.

== Death ==
Braun died in Lauderhill, Florida, on March 20, 2024, at the age of 83.
