= Entity realism =

Philosophy of science position

Entity realism (sometimes equated with referential realism) is a philosophical position within the debate about scientific realism. It is a variation of realism (originally proposed by Stanford School philosophers Nancy Cartwright and Ian Hacking in 1983) that restricts warranted belief to only certain entities.

== Overview ==
Whereas traditional scientific realism argues that our best scientific theories are true, approximately true, or closer to the truth than their predecessors, entity realism does not commit itself to judgments about scientific theories' truth. Instead, it holds that the theoretical entities in scientific theories, e.g. 'electrons', should be regarded as real if and only if they can be routinely used to create effects in domains that can be investigated independently. 'Manipulative success' thus becomes the criterion by which to judge the reality of (typically unobservable) scientific entities. As Ian Hacking, the main proponent of this formulation of entity realism, puts it (referring to an experiment he observed in a Stanford laboratory, where electrons and positrons were sprayed, one after the other, onto a superconducting metal sphere), "if you can spray them, then they are real."

Entity realism has been an influential position partly because it coincided with a general trend in philosophy of science, and science studies more generally, to highlight the role of experimentation, instrumentation, and scientific practice. Thus, entity realism sometimes is also called instrumental realism or experimental realism.

== Criticism ==
While many philosophers acknowledge the intuitive pull of entity realism, it has also been strongly criticised, both as too restrictive (in that it ignores entities that are observable yet do not lend themselves to manipulation) and as too permissive (to the extent that seemingly successful instances of manipulation may turn out to be spurious).

Entity realism is indeed a realist position (since it defends the reality of unobservable entities), but it is selectively realist (a form of selective realism according to critics), since "it restricts warranted belief to entities only, and suggests to fellow realists that they are wrong in claiming that the theoretical descriptions of these entities are approximately true". It has also been argued that to a certain extent "this scepticism about theories is motivated by none other than the argument from the pessimistic induction".

== See also ==
- Semirealism, a similar position
