= Peter Galison =

American historian and philosopher of science (born 1955)

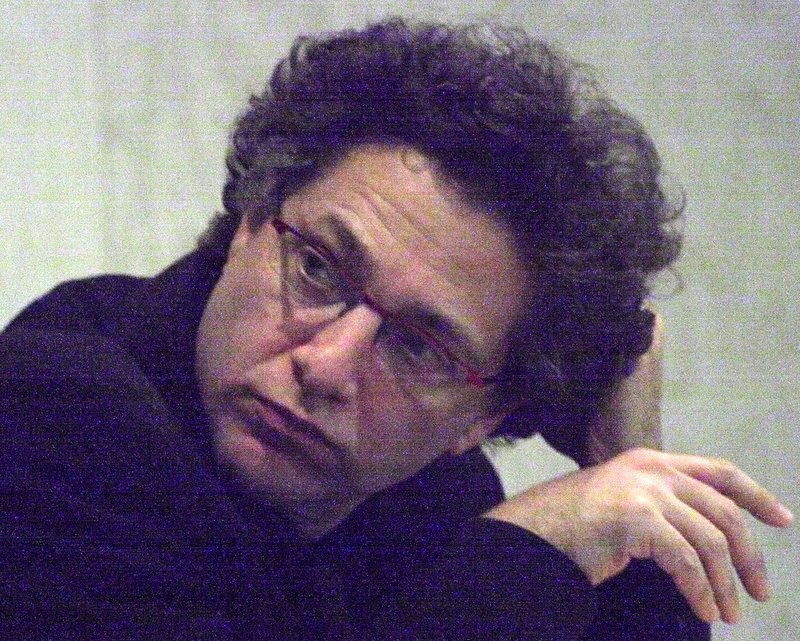
- Galison in 2007
- Born: Peter Louis Galison; May 17, 1955 (age 71); New York City, U.S.

Academic background
- Education: Harvard University (BA, MA, PhD)
- Doctoral advisor: Howard Georgi; Erwin N. Hiebert

Academic work
- Discipline: Philosophy of science, history
- Sub-discipline: History of science, philosophy of science
- Institutions: Stanford University; Harvard University
- Doctoral students: Naomi Oreskes; Alex Wellerstein

Peter Louis Galison (born May 17, 1955) is an American historian and philosopher of science. He is the Joseph Pellegrino University Professor in history of science and physics at Harvard University.

== Biography ==
Galison received his B.A., M.A., and Ph.D., in both physics and history of science, at Harvard University. His publications include How Experiments End (1987), Image and Logic: A Material Culture of Microphysics (1997), and Einstein's Clocks, Poincaré's Maps (2003). His most recent book, co-authored with Lorraine Daston, is titled Objectivity (2007).

Before moving to Harvard, Galison taught for several years at Stanford University, where he was professor of history, philosophy, and physics. He is considered a member of the Stanford school of philosophy of science, a group that also includes Ian Hacking, John Dupré, and Nancy Cartwright.

Galison wrote a film for the History Channel on the development of the hydrogen bomb, and has done work on the intersection of science with other disciplines, in particular art (along with Caroline A. Jones, his wife) and architecture. He is on the editorial board of Critical Inquiry and was a MacArthur Fellow in 1997. For his "outstanding contributions to the history of physics", Galison received the American Physical Society's Abraham Pais Prize in 2018.

== Philosophical work ==
In Image and Logic, Galison explored the fundamental rift rising in the physical sciences: whether singular, visual accounts of scientific phenomena would be accepted as the dominant language of proof, or whether statistically significant, frequently repeated results would dominate the field. This division, Galison claims, can be seen in the conflicts amongst high-energy physicists investigating new particles, some of whom offer up statistically significant and frequently replicated analysis of the new particle passing through electric fields, others of whom offer up a single picture of a particle behaving—in a single instance—in a way that cannot be explained by the characteristics of existing known particles. This image/logic distinction has been applied to explore the development of other disciplines—for example, archaeology.

His work with Lorraine Daston developed the concept of mechanical objectivity which is often used in scholarly literature, and he has done pioneering work on applying the anthropological notion of trading zones to scientific practice.

== Documentary films ==
Galison has been involved in the production of several documentary films. The first, The Ultimate Weapon: The H-Bomb Dilemma, was about the political and scientific decisions behind the creation of the first hydrogen bomb in the United States, and it premiered on the History Channel in 2000. The second, Secrecy, which Galison directed with Harvard filmmaker Robb Moss, is about the costs and benefits of government secrecy, and premiered at the 2008 Sundance Film Festival. Also from Harvard, Ruth Lingford worked on the animation for Secrecy. Galison completed his third documentary film Containment, also directed with Robb Moss, in 2015. It premiered at the 2015 Full Frame Documentary Film Festival, and has been shown at film festivals around the world including in Brazil, Switzerland, and Australia. This documentary investigates governments' attempts to contain a hundred million gallons of deadly radioactive sludge for 10,000 years: how can people warn future generations across this immense time span during which languages, cultures and the environment will continually transform?

Galison's fourth documentary, Black Holes: The Edge of All We Know, about the Event Horizon Telescope, appeared in 2021 on Netflix and Apple TV.

== Bibliography ==
- Galison, Peter (1987). How Experiments End. Chicago: University of Chicago Press. ISBN 978-0-226-27915-2.
- Galison, Peter; Hevly, Bruce (1992). Big Science: The Growth of Large-Scale Research. Stanford: Stanford University Press. ISBN 978-0-8047-2335-0.
- Galison, Peter; Stump, David J. (1996). The Disunity of Science: Boundaries, Contexts, and Power. Stanford: Stanford University Press. ISBN 978-0-8047-2562-0.
- Galison, Peter (1997). Image and Logic: A Material Culture of Microphysics. Chicago: University of Chicago Press. ISBN 978-0-226-27917-6.
- Galison, Peter; Jones, Caroline A. (1998). Picturing Science, Producing Art. New York: Routledge. ISBN 978-0-415-91912-8.
- Galison, Peter (2003). Einstein's Clocks and Poincaré's Maps: empires of time. New York: W.W. Norton. ISBN 978-0-393-02001-4.
- Galison, Peter; Daston, Lorraine (2007). Objectivity. New York: Zone Books Distributed by the MIT Press. ISBN 978-1-890951-79-5.
- Galison, Peter; Holton, Gerald; Schweber, Silvan S. (2008). Einstein for the 21st Century: His Legacy in Science, Art, and Modern Culture. Princeton: Princeton University Press. ISBN 978-0-691-13520-5.

== Filmography ==
- The Ultimate Weapon: The H-Bomb Dilemma (2000) Writer/producer, 44 minutes. Premiere: The History Channel, 2000.
- Secrecy (2008) Producer/Director (with Robb Moss), 85 minutes. Premiere: The Sundance Film Festival (2008).
- Containment (2015) Producer/Director (with Robb Moss), 81 minutes. Premiere: Full Frame Documentary Film Festival, Durham, North Carolina (2015).
- Black Holes: The Edge of All We Know (2021) Director, 99 minutes.
