= Colin A. Ross =

Canadian psychiatrist

- Born: July 14, 1950 (age 76); Canada

Colin A. Ross (July 14, 1950) is a Canadian psychiatrist and former president of the International Society for the Study of Trauma and Dissociation from 1993 to 1994. There is controversy about his methods and claims, which include recovering memories through hypnosis of Satanic ritual abuse.

Ross has also produced several documentaries and educational films about Dissociative Identity Disorder. In 1999, he teamed with producer James Myer in the making of Multiple Personality: Reality and Illusion. The docudrama featured Chris Costner Sizemore, a woman that became famous because of a rare diagnosis (at that time) of Multiple Personality Disorder (MPD). Ms. Sizemore's life was portrayed by Joanne Woodward in the Fox motion picture The Three Faces of Eve.

== Claims of paranormal ability ==
In 2008, Ross applied for the James Randi Educational Foundation's One Million Dollar Paranormal Challenge with the claim that energy from his eyes could cause a speaker, receiving no other input, to sound a tone.

In 2010, Ross published experimental data that he claimed supported his hypothesis that the eyes emit energy that can be captured and measured in the Anthropology of Consciousness, a journal of the American Anthropological Association. During correspondence with Steven Novella of The Skeptic's Guide to the Universe, he conceded that the equipment he was using was a biofeedback machine attached to his laptop, and that the laptop was responding in a well-understood way to an eye blink. However, he claimed that he could still send energy beams out of his eyes, and was working on modifying the software to ignore an eye blink. His claim has not currently been tested by the JREF. In 2008, he was granted the tongue-in-cheek Pigasus Award.

== Works ==
=== Books ===
- Multiple Personality Disorder: Diagnosis, Clinical Features, and Treatment. New York: John Wiley & Sons (1989). ISBN 0471615153. OCLC 1245634439.
  - 2nd ed.: Dissociative Identity Disorder: Diagnosis, Clinical Features, and Treatment of Multiple Personality. New York: John Wiley & Sons (1996). ISBN 978-0471132653.
- The Osiris Complex: Case Studies in Multiple Personality Disorder. University of Toronto Press (1994). ISBN 978-1442681972. OCLC 244768071.
- Satanic Ritual Abuse: Principles of Treatment. University of Toronto Press (1995). ISBN 978-0802073570.
- BLUEBIRD: Deliberate Creation of Multiple Personality by Psychiatrist (2000).
  - Republished as The CIA Doctors: Human Rights Violations by American Psychiatrists. Richardson, TX: Manitou Communications (2006). ISBN 978-0976550808.
- Schizophrenia: Innovations in Diagnosis and Treatment. New York: Haworth Maltreatment & Trauma Press (2004). ISBN 978-0789022691. OCLC 870272495.
- Moon Shadows: Stories of Trauma & Recovery (2007).
- The Trauma Model: A Solution to the Problem of Comorbidity in Psychiatry. Richardson, TX: Manitou (2007). ISBN 0970452500.
- The Great Psychiatry Scam: One Shrink's Personal Journey (2008).
- Pseudoscience in Biological Psychiatry: Blaming the Body (1995).
- Military Mind Control: A Story of Trauma and Recovery (2009).
- Trauma Model Therapy (2009).
- Human Energy Fields: A New Science of Medicine (2011).
- Structural Dissociation: A Proposed Modification of the Theory (2013).
- The Trump Card: A Psychiatrist Analyzes Reactions to Donald Trump (2017).
- Treatment of Dissociative Identity Disorder (2018).
- Be A Teammate With Yourself (2019).
- The Genetics of Schizophrenia (2020).
- Opus 5 In B Flat And Other Poems (2020).
- The Rape of Eve (2014).

=== Contributions ===
- "History, Phenomenology and Epidemiology of Dissociation." In: Handbook of dissociation: Theoretical, empirical, and clinical perspectives, ed. Larry K. Michelson and William J. Ray. Plenum Press (1996). doi:10.1007/978-1-4899-0310-5.
- "Sexual orientation conflict in the dissociative disorders." In: Trauma and Sexuality: The effects of childhood sexual, physical, and emotional abuse on sexual identity and behavior. New York: Haworth Medical Press (2002), pp. 136-147. ISBN 978-0789020420. OCLC 1083763562.

=== Selected articles ===
- "The Dissociative Experience Scale: A Replication Study," with G. Ron Norton and Geri Anderson. Dissociation, vol. 1, no. 3 (September 1988), pp. 21-22.
- "A factor analysis of dissociative experiences scale (DES) in dissociative disorder." Dissociation, vol. VIII, no. 4 (December 1995), pp. 229-235.
- "Childhood trauma, psychosis and schizophrenia: a literature review with theoretical and clinical implications." Acta Psychiatrica Scandinavica, vol. 112, no. 5 (2005), pp. 330-350. doi:10.1111/j.1600-0447.2005.00634.x.
- "Dissociative identity disorder." Current Psychosis and Therapeutics Reports, vol. 4 (September 2006), pp. 112–116. doi:10.1007/BF02629332.

=== Book reviews ===
- Fraser, George A. (Sep. 1990). Review of Multiple Personality Disorder: Diagnosis, Clinical Features and Treatment by Colin A. Ross. Dissociation, vol. 3, no. 3, p. 174.
- Brenner, Ira (Mar. 2002). Review of The Trauma Model: A Solution to the Problem of Comorbidity in Psychiatry by Colin A. Ross. Psychiatric Services, vol. 53, no. 3, pp. 350-351. doi:10.1176/appi.ps.53.3.350.
