= The Stranger in the Mirror =

Novel

The Stranger in the Mirror: Dissociation – The Hidden Epidemic
- Author: Marlene Steinberg; Maxine Schnall
- Language: English
- Publication date: 2000
- Publication place: United States

The Stranger in the Mirror: Dissociation – The Hidden Epidemic, written by Marlene Steinberg and Maxine Schnall is a book which goes through case files of individuals with dissociative identity disorder, who have suffered traumatizing happenings and how they have employed dissociation as a defense mechanism to detach themselves from the emotional stimuli which the victims endured.

The Stranger In The Mirror is one of the few books to be written about dissociation and its potential treatments. Steinberg conducted her research on dissociation at Yale University school of medicine.
