= Caroline A. Jones =

American art historian

- Born: April 21, 1954 (age 72); Durham, North Carolina, United States
- Education: Harvard-Radcliffe College, Stanford University
- Known for: Art History and Art Theory
- Awards: Guggenheim Fellowship (1999)

Caroline A. Jones (born 1954) is an American art historian, author, curator, and critic. She teaches and serves within the History Theory Criticism Section of the Department of Architecture at MIT School of Architecture and Planning, Cambridge, Massachusetts, United States.

== Early life and education ==
Jones is the daughter of Virginia Sweetnam Jones and Edward E. Jones, a Princeton Psychology professor. She studied visual studies and art history, receiving an AB magna cum laude at Harvard-Radcliffe College (1977) and did graduate work at the Institute of Fine Arts in New York (1983). She completed her PhD at Stanford University in 1992. She is the sister of Amelia Jones, another prominent contemporary art historian.

Before completing her art history studies, Jones worked in museum administration and exhibition curation at The Museum of Modern Art in New York (1977–83) and at the Harvard University Art Museums (1983–85), and completed two documentary films. Her work has addressed topics including the human sensorium, the institutionalization of modernism and postmodernism, history and theory of technology, and intersections of art and science (including collaborative projects with her partner Peter Galison). Her exhibitions and films have been shown at several venues including the San Francisco Museum of Modern Art, the Hirshhorn Museum and Sculpture Garden in Washington DC, the Hara Museum of Contemporary Art in Tokyo, the Boston University Art Gallery, and MIT's List Visual Arts Center.

== Career and research ==
Jones previously taught contemporary art and theory, and served as the director of museum studies, at Boston University; she currently is Professor in the History, Theory, and Criticism section of the Department of Architecture at MIT. Her research into histories of artistic engagement with systems theory of the 1960s and 1970s extends to a critique of contemporary human systems that govern planetary conservation, in response to which Jones has called for a greater cultural emphasis on symbiosis and an interspecies commons. She has discussed her hope that contemporary artists can help to evolve human consciousness by changing the ways that humans sense the planet, using the term “symbiontics” (a word composed of the words symbiosis and ontic).

In 2013, Jones "reinvented" a full exhibition of the artist Hans Haacke formerly presented at MIT in 1967, titled Hans Haacke 1967.

Her 2017 Global Work of Art: World's Fairs, Biennials, and the Aesthetics of Experience is a history of the idea of "globalism" over a century of international art biennials. Her book Experience: Culture, Cognition, and the Common Sense (2016) was co-edited by Jones along with David Mather and Rebecca Uchill. That book convened conversation with artists, musicians, philosophers, anthropologists, historians, and neuroscientists who explore the concept of "experience" across scientific, sensorial, and cultural realms.

Jones contributed an interview with artist Anicka Yi to the 2016 book Anicka Yi: 6,070,430K of Digital Spit, published in conjunction with the 2015 exhibition by the same title at the List Visual Arts Center. Jones was one of the subjects of Yi's work in her 2015 exhibition You Can Call Me F, for which one hundred women contributed biological material to the gallery at The Kitchen. Yi intended with this work to align "society’s growing paranoia around contagion and hygiene (both public and private) with the enduring patriarchal fear of feminism and potency of female networks."

Jones authored Eyesight Alone: Clement Greenberg's Modernism and the Bureaucratization of the Senses (2006), which demonstrates how theories of modernism in the work of controversial art critic Clement Greenberg were connected to his desire to prioritize, and therefore isolate, the sense of sight. Jones's book connects Greenberg's influential opinions in the category of art to positivist scientific philosophy and a culture of "bureaucratization of the senses."

== Awards ==
Jones was a National Humanities Center Fellow in 2017–2018, a Radcliffe Fellow in 2013–2014, and a Guggenheim Fellow in 1999. She is also the recipient of fellowships from the National Endowment for the Humanities, the Newhouse Center for the Humanities at Wellesley College (2009–10), the Institute national d'histoire de l'art in Paris (2006–7), the Wissenschaftskolleg zu Berlin, the Max Planck Institut (2001–2), the Institute for Advanced Study in Princeton (1994–95), and the Stanford Humanities Center (1986–87).

== Books ==
- Modern art at Harvard: the formation of the nineteenth- and twentieth-century collections of the Harvard University Art Museums (Harvard University Art Museums, 1985)
- Sol LeWitt: new works (Arthur M. Sackler Museum, 1985)
- Twentieth-century drawings from the Anderson Collection: Auguste Rodin to Elizabeth Murray (The Museum, 1988)
- Manuel Neri: plasters with Manuel Neri, Graham William John Beal, San Francisco Museum of Modern Art (San Francisco Museum of Modern Art, 1989)
- Richard Diebenkorn: Hara Museum of Contemporary Art, Tokyo, October 14 to December 3, 1989 with Richard Diebenkorn, Hara Bijutsukan, San Francisco Museum of Modern Art (Arc-en-Ciel Foundation, 1989)
- Bay area figurative art: 1950-1965 (University of California Press, 1990)
- Frank Lobdell: works, 1947-1992 with Frank Lobdell, Stanford Art Gallery, Stanford University Museum of Art (Stanford University Museum of Art, 1993)
- Machine in the studio: constructing the postwar American artist (The University of Chicago Press, 1996)
- Painting machines: industrial image and process in contemporary art (University of Washington Press, 1997)
- Sensorium: Embodied Experience, Technology, and Contemporary Art (MIT Press, 2006)
- Eyesight alone: Clement Greenberg's modernism and the bureaucratization of the senses (University of Chicago Press, 2008)
- The global work of art: world's fairs, biennials, and the aesthetics of experience (University of Chicago Press, 2017)
- Picturing science, producing art editor with Peter Galison, Amy Slaton (Routledge, 2013)
- Experience: culture, cognition, and the common sense with David S. Mather, Rebecca Uchill (The MIT Press, 2016)
