= Carolyn Jones (filmmaker) =

American filmmaker

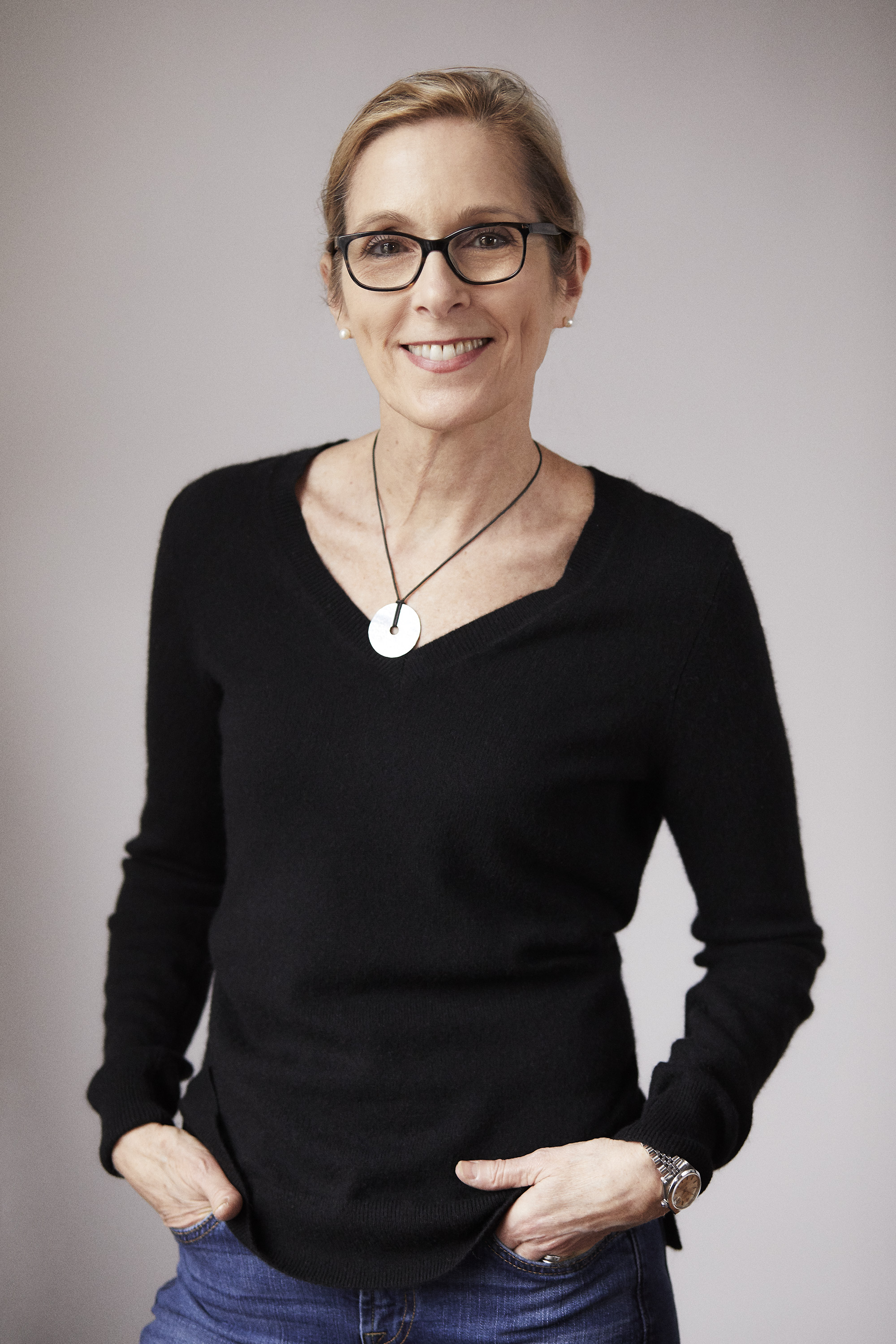
- Jones in 2019
- Born: Lancaster, Pennsylvania
- Occupations: Photographer, filmmaker, author, speaker
- Years active: 1993–present
- Known for: The American Nurse (2014)
- Notable work: Living Proof: Courage in the Face of AIDS

Carolyn Jones is an American director, writer, producer, photographer and speaker. She is best known for her 1997 book publication Living Proof: Courage in the Face of AIDS, her 2014 documentary The American Nurse, and her 2017 documentary Defining Hope. She is co-founder of the non-profit 100 People Foundation. Her television appearances include PBS NewsHour, WNET's MetroFocus, and Katie Couric's show Katie.

== Filmography ==
- Living Proof: HIV and the Pursuit of Happiness (co-writer) (1994)
- The American Nurse (2014)
- Defining Hope (2017)
- In Case of Emergency (2020)

== Books ==
- Living Proof: Courage in the face of AIDS (1997)
- The Family of Women: Voices Across the Generations (1999)
- Every Girl Tells A Story (2002)
- The American Nurse: Photographs and Interviews by Carolyn Jones (2012)
