= Secrecy (film) =

- Directed by: Peter Galison; Robb Moss
- Edited by: Chyld King
- Release date: January 18, 2008
- Running time: 85 minutes
- Country: United States
- Language: English

Secrecy is a 2008 documentary film directed by Harvard University professors Peter Galison and Robb Moss. According to its website, it "is a film about the vast, invisible world of government secrecy," and features interviews with a variety of people on all sides of the secrecy issue, including Steven Aftergood (of Federation of American Scientists), Tom Blanton (of the National Security Archive), James B. Bruce (who was a senior staff member to the Iraq Intelligence Commission), Barton Gellman (a Washington Post journalist), Melissa Boyle Mahle (a former CIA officer), the plaintiffs in United States v. Reynolds (1953) (the case which established the State Secrets Privilege in the United States), Siegfried Hecker (former director of Los Alamos National Laboratory), Mike Levin (a former member of the National Security Agency), and Neal Katyal and Charles Swift (the lawyers for the defendant in Hamdan v. Rumsfeld).

The film competed in the Documentary Competition at the 2008 Sundance Film Festival and at the Berlin Film Festival, among many other venues.

The film was the winner of the Special Jury Award for Documentary Features at the Independent Film Festival, Boston, and was named Best Documentary at the Newport International Film Festival.

== See also ==
- Khalid El-Masri
