= Caroline Wickham-Jones =

Scottish archaeologist (1955–2022)

- Born: 25 April 1955; Stockton-on-Tees, England
- Died: 13 January 2022 (aged 66)

Academic background
- Education: University of Edinburgh; University of Birmingham

Academic work
- Discipline: Archaeology
- Sub-discipline: Prehistoric archaeology
- Institutions: University of Aberdeen

Caroline Rosa Wickham-Jones MA MSocSci FSA HonFSAScot MCIfA (25 April 1955 – 13 January 2022) was a British archaeologist specialising in Stone Age Orkney. She was a lecturer at the University of Aberdeen until her retirement in 2015.

== Early life ==
Wickham-Jones was born in Stockton-on-Tees, County Durham, England, on 25 April 1955. She was the oldest child of Charles and Primrose (née Baylis) Wickham-Jones. Charles Wickham-Jones was an industrial chemist and charity worker. Primrose Wickham-Jones had been a nurse.

== Education ==
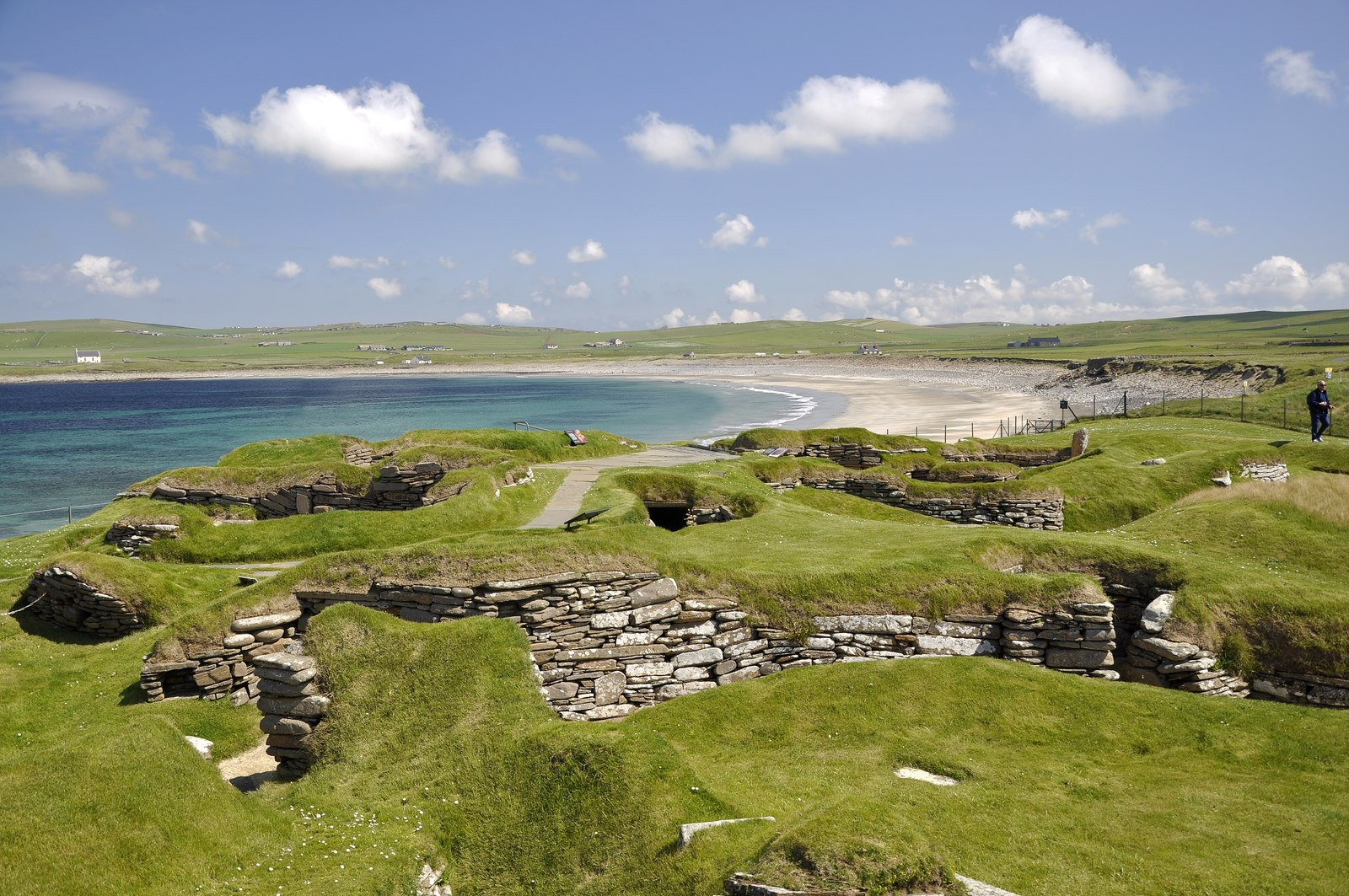
Skara Brae

Wickham-Jones studied archaeology at the University of Edinburgh under Stuart Piggott, Trevor Watkins, and Roger Mercer. In 1975, as a student, she went to the National Museum of Antiquities of Scotland, where she helped in post-excavation tasks for David Clarke's 1972-3 Skara Brae excavations. She used these skills developed in her undergraduate thesis working on a lithic assemblage from the Skara Brae excavations employing use-wear analysis.

Wickham-Jones went onto gain a master's degree in Heritage Management from the University of Birmingham.

== Career ==
After Wickham-Jones graduated she began a post holding responsibility for the daily running of the Artefact Research Unit at the National Museum of Antiquities of Scotland, where she worked from 1977 to 1988. Throughout her time at the unit, she participated in various research projects. For example, in 1982, she joined a small team of experimental archaeologists in living according to hunter/fisher/gatherer lifestyle on the shore of Lake Lille Avasjo, Lappland.

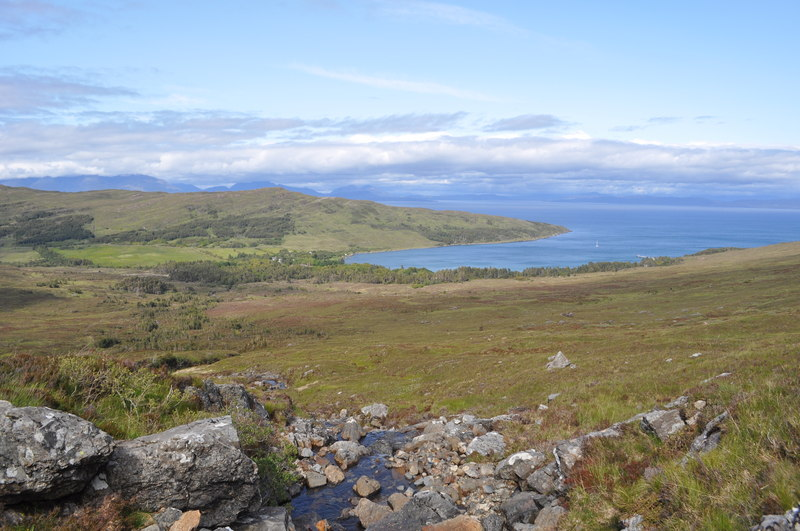
Isle of Rum

In 1984, Wickham-Jones directed her first major project with the excavation of a Mesolithic site at Kinloch, Isle of Rum, having decided to focus on the understudied period of the Mesolithic. The excavations at Kinloch were an important catalyst that re-sparked interest in Scottish Mesolithic archaeology, producing the earliest radiocarbon dates for Mesolithic settlement at the time. Wickham-Jones published her findings in a book titled Rhum: Mesolithic and Later Sites at Kinloch, Excavations 1984-86, in 1990.

After completing her master's degree, Wickham-Jones became the Executive Secretary of the Society of Antiquaries of Scotland. At a similar time, she became a trustee of the John Muir Trust encouraging a commitment to land management informed by a knowledge of past land-use. Throughout her career, Wickham-Jones was fascinated by the relationship between people and the environment.

In the late 1990s and early 2000s Wickham-Jones undertook her major project "Scotland's First Settlers," which was funded by Historic Scotland and co-directed with Karen Hardy. Fieldwork was undertaken from 1998 to 2004 and was published in full in 2009. During this time, Wickham-Jones also started her university lecturing career, sharing her archaeological knowledge at the University of Edinburgh and from 2009 to 2015 as an honorary research assistant and lecturer in archaeology in the University of Aberdeen's newly formed Department of Archaeology. Her research at Aberdeen, supported by the Leverhulme Trust, focused on the submerged landscape of Orkney around Scapa Flow. As a specialist on the Mesolithic, she collaborated on the University of Aberdeen's "Rising Tide" project and the University of the Highlands and Islands' "Turning Back the Tide" project. She saw the role of archaeological work in contributing to wider discussions about responses to climate change. She felt that understanding how our ancestors lived held important "keys to our continued existence". Wickham-Jones also held a visiting research fellowship at the University of the Highlands and Islands

In 2002, Wickham-Jones moved to Orkney with her young son Guille, where she became an important member of Orkney society. She was a board member of the Orkney Archaeological Trust, Orkney Countryside Access Forum, and, a decade later, Orkney Marine Heritage Forum, and Orkney Heritage Society. She also helped develop the research agenda for the Neolithic Orkney World Heritage Site that was published in 2006.

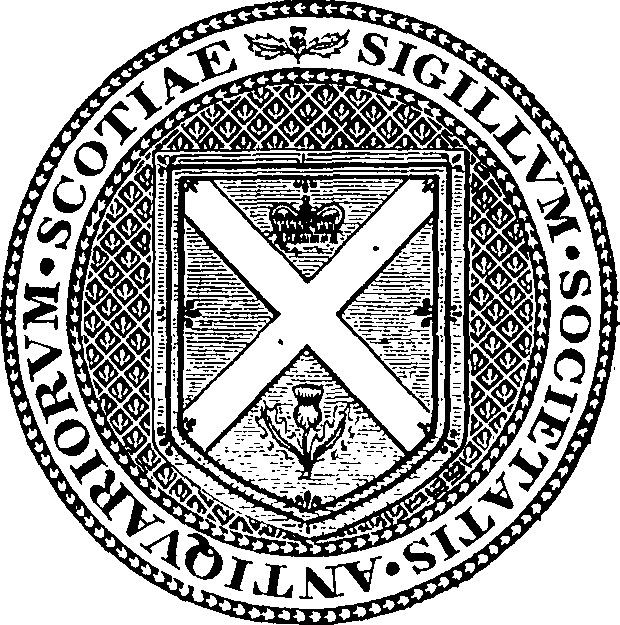
Society of Antiquaries of Scotland

Wickham-Jones was also involved in numerous other societies. She was a trustee of the Caithness Archaeological Trust, a fellow of the Society of Antiquaries of London, and a member of the Chartered Institute for Archaeologists. She became a Fellow of the Society of Antiquaries of Scotland in 1976 and became an Honorary Fellow in 2018.

For Wickham-Jones the personal and the professional were always intertwined and she often wrote about her love of archaeology and own experiences in her blog.

She died from amyloidosis caused by cancer on 13 January 2022, at the age of 66.

== Selected publications ==
Throughout her academic career Wickham-Jones not only published books, booklets, and edited volumes, but also 53 journal articles, 28 book chapters, and numerous magazine articles.

Individual Publications:

- 2019; Landscape Beneath the Waves: The Archaeological Investigation of Underwater Landscapes. Oxford: Oxbow Books.
- 2019; Seamless Archaeology: The Use of Archaeology in the Study of Seascapes. In King, T. & Robinson, G. At Home on the Waves. New York: Berghahn books.
- 2014; Prehistoric Hunter-Gatherer Innovations: Coastal Adaptions. In Cummings, V., P. Jordan & M. Zvelebil. (eds.) The Oxford Handbook of the Archaeology and Anthropology of Hunter- gatherers. Oxford: Oxford University Press, 694–711.
- 2012; The Monuments of Orkney. Edinburgh: Historic Scotland.
- 2010; Fear of Farming. Oxford: Oxbow Books/Windgather Press.
- 2006; Between the Water and the Wind, World Heritage Orkney, Windgather Press (revised and republished in 2015)
- 2003, Scotland's First Settlers, London, Batsford
- 2001;The Landscape of Scotland: A Hidden History, Gloucester: Tempus. (republished by The History Press: Feb 2009)
- 1998; Orkney, an Historical Guide; Edinburgh: Birlinn Press. (reprinted and updated in 2007; revised edition published in 2015, reprinted 2017, 2018 and 2019)
- 1993; A Round Bottomed Vessel from a New Archaeological Site at Papadil, Rum; Glasgow Archaeol J; 18;73-5
- 1990, Rhum: Mesolithic and Later Sites at Kinloch, Excavations 1984-86; Society of Antiquaries of Scotland Monograph Series.
- 1987; A Discoidal Flint Knife from Near Huntly, Aberdeenshire; Proc Soc Antiq Scot; 117; 1986–7; 354–5.
- 1986; The Procurement and Use Of Stone For Flaked Tools in Prehistoric Scotland; Proc Soc Antiq Scot; 116; 1- 10.

Joint Publications:

- Barclay GJ, Carter SP, Dalland MM, Hastie M, Holden TG, MacSween A, & Wickham-Jones CR, 2002, A Possible Neolithic Settlement at Kinbeachie, Easter Ross. Proceedings of the Society of Antiquaries of Scotland, 131 (2001) 57–86.
- Ballin, T. B. and Wickham-Jones, C.R. 2017. Searching for the Scottish Late Upper Palaeolithic: a case study from Nethermills Farm, Aberdeenshire. Journal of Lithic Studies, 4, 1–15.
- Bates CR, Bates M, Dawson S, Huws D, Whittaker JE, and Wickham-Jones CR 2016, The Environmental context of the Neolithic Monuments on the Brodgar Isthmus, Mainland, Orkney. Journal of Archaeological Science: Reports, 7, 394–407.
- Bates M, Nayling N, Bates CR, Dawson S, Huws D, & Wickham-Jones CR 2013 A multi-disciplinary approach to the archaeological investigation of a bedrock dominated shallow marine landscape: an example from the Bay of Firth, Orkney, UK. International Journal of Nautical Archaeology, 42.
- Cucchi T, R Barnett, N Martínková, S Renaud, E Renvoisé, A Evin, A Sheridan, I Mainland, CR Wickham- Jones, C Tougard, JP Quéré, M Pascal, M Pascal, G Heckel, P O’Higgins, JB Searle & KM Dobney; 2014. The changing pace of insular life: 5000 years of microevolution in the Orkney vole (Microtus arvalis orcadensis), Evolution, 68/10, 2804–2820.
- Elphinstone M & Wickham-Jones CR 2012 Archaeology and Fiction Antiquity, 86, 532–537.
- Wickham-Jones CR, Dawson S & Bates CR 2009, The Submerged Landscape of Orkney. Archaeological Journal, 166 (supplement: Orkney guide), 26–30.
- Wickham-Jones CR & Firth CR 2000; Mesolithic settlement of northern Scotland: first results of fieldwork in Caithness and Orkney, in Young R (ed) Mesolithic Lifeways, current research from Britain and Ireland, Leicester: Leicester Archaeology Monographs no 7, 119–32.
- Wickham-Jones CR & Woodman P 1998; Studies on the Early Settlement of Scotland and Ireland; in Strauss L & Ericksen B (eds); As the World Warmed, Human Adaptions Across the Pleistocene/Holocene Boundary; (= Quaternary International 49/50); 13–20. Oxford: Pergamon.
