= Vedat Şar =

Turkish psychiatrist and professor (born 1955)

- Born: 1955 (age 70–71)
- Medical career
- Profession: Professor, Researcher, Psychotherapist
- Field: Psychiatry
- Institutions: Koç University Istanbul University Hacettepe University
- Sub-specialties: Psychological trauma
- Website: http://www.vedatsar.com/en

Vedat Şar (born 1955) is a Turkish psychiatrist and professor who specialises in psychological trauma and dissociative disorders. His work is particularly concerned with childhood trauma, the epidemiology of dissociative disorders, complex posttraumatic stress disorder, borderline personality disorder, and treatment with EMDR.

Şar was president of the International Society for the Study of Trauma and Dissociation from 2007 to 2008, and president of the European Society for Traumatic Stress Studies from 2013 to 2015. Currently, he is a professor and chair of department of psychiatry at the Koç University's School of Medicine. Previously, he served as a professor of psychiatry at Istanbul University for more than two decades.

In early 1990s he founded the Clinical Psychotherapy Unit and Dissociative Disorders Program in Istanbul University, a clinical research center specialized in dissociation and complex trauma. The Program contributed to the psychotraumatology studies from a cross-cultural perspective and altered the pre-dominant conception of dissociative identity disorder as a phenomenon isolated to Western world. He has served as an international advisor to the American Psychiatric Association's DSM-5 Workgroup on Anxiety, Obsessive-Compulsive, Post-Traumatic, and Dissociative Disorders. In recognition for his work in the study of dissociation he received various awards including the Lifetime Achievement Award by International Society for the Study of Trauma and Dissociation in 2015.

He and co-author Erdinç Öztürk coined the term sociological self, in the context of the "functional dissociation of the self" model.

In 2013 he was involved with the diagnosis and treatment of a highly publicized "vampire" case in Turkey, which became the subject of an article that was published in the journal of Psychotherapy and Psychosomatics. He frequently provides commentary to the media and participates as a speaker in cross-disciplinary panels about the psychological and sociological dynamics of trauma.

As of January 2017, he was one of the 150 most influential Turkish scientists in terms of impact factor.
