= Marlene Steinberg =

American psychiatrist

Marlene Steinberg is an American psychiatrist who is a researcher on Dissociation symptoms and disorders. She developed the pioneering: The Structured Clinical Interview for DSM-IV Dissociative Disorders (SCID-D) and wrote in conjunction with Maxine Schnall, The Stranger In The Mirror Dissociation - The Hidden Epidemic.

Steinberg conducted her research on dissociation at Yale University School of Medicine

Steinberg has opened a private practice in Naples, Florida offering intensive treatment for those suffering from dissociative disorders.
