= Rewriting the Soul =

1995 book by Ian Hacking

Rewriting the Soul: Multiple Personality and the Sciences of Memory
- Author: Ian Hacking
- Language: English
- Subject: Dissociative identity disorder
- Publisher: Princeton University Press
- Publication date: 1995
- Publication place: United States
- Media type: Print
- Pages: 352
- ISBN: 978-0-691-05908-2

Rewriting the Soul is a 1995 book by the Canadian philosopher Ian Hacking, who offers an account of the formative influences that shape people’s understandings of their lives and their understanding of the lives of those around them. Hacking's work is both a theoretical account of the concepts and modes of agentic engagement through which people encounter the world and make sense of themselves, and a psychological account of how minds relate to memories and the fragility of this relationship, especially in the lives of people exposed to extremes of suffering and cruelty. Through a study of the history and manifestations of multiple personality disorder, Hacking describes how people come to an understanding of their lives through their own memories and autobiographies. Hacking describes the shifting shared meanings that shape our memories and become the threads with which people weave their biographies.

== Argument ==
To develop his argument, Hacking offers an account of how those engaged with MPD have inquired into its reality over historical time and describes the concepts and practices that developed through those inquiries. In the past three decades of the twentieth century, therapy tended to take an individual with an amorphous and confused array of painful experiences and parse them into autonomous personality fragments, each dissociated (to varying degrees) from the other fragments and each with its own memories and descriptions of past experiences. The outcome of therapy for multiple personality disorder is a person that does not know herself: a person with a fragmented soul. “It is contrary to what the philosophers call freedom. It is contrary to our best vision of what it is to be a human” (p. 267).

Hacking offers the reader some possible modes of questioning and critiquing the understandings of personality, memory and the Disorder that have emerged within a historical context and, on occasions, he offers his own understanding of how these concepts have emerged and their implications to contemporary understandings of psychology. Hacking does not question whether multiple personality disorder is real. Rather, he offers a strategy for questioning reality: Is the multiple personality disorder a real what? One might say, for example, that multiple personality disorder is a real mode of engaging with the world and a real way of understanding the past. In Rewriting the Soul, Hacking seeks to examine why Western society takes it for granted that “memory is the key to the soul” (p. 20) and why multiple personality disorder became so closely associated with traumatic memories.

== History of multiple personality disorder ==
The first known case of an individual with conduct that would today be considered multiple personality disorder was recorded in the late 18th century (Hacking, 1995). In 1972, there were ten known cases over the previous fifty years despite a widespread interest in psychotherapy over that period. By 1986, it was believed that six thousand cases had been diagnosed.

As cases of multiple personality began to emerge in the 1970s, they attracted the interest not only of therapists and the psychiatric profession, but also of the media. Awareness and discussion of multiple personality disorder became widespread. multiple personality disorder became a kind of mental illness. It became a kind of thing that someone could have. This is what Hacking refers to as “semantic contagion” (p. 238). Before its meaning became prevalent in society, one could not describe oneself as a person of that kind. There were confused individuals who were (either deliberately or pre-reflectively) seeking to dissociate themselves from memories of painful events. These people, however, could not have described themselves as having the Disorder, nor could people in psychology diagnose their patients with this term. Once MPD became a kind of thing, it became a way for individuals to understand themselves and understand people around them.

Other meanings associated with MPD arose contemporaneously in the 1970s and 1980s. Child abuse was not a meaning shared and understood in Western societies before the 1970s. “Cruelty to children” and “baby battering” were perhaps the precursors of this term, although the meaning implied by these terms was mostly restricted to physical violence. With “child abuse,” the sexual use of children was not only incorporated into our understanding of the ill treatment of children, but became the most probable form.

It needs to be stressed that Hacking (1995) does not suggest child abuse only began to occur when the term had been coined. Nevertheless, it may have increased the prevalence of child abuse. Some men may discover child rape for themselves, some may have learned it from their own childhood experiences and some (perhaps many) may sexually abuse children because the idea of such conduct was imbued through semantic contagion. Hacking is also careful to note that the use of children for sexual purposes is a cause of suffering to children whether or not the term “child abuse” is in common usage. One can imagine, for example, that an eleven-year-old boy in ancient Greece coerced into sex by his mentor would suffer pain and mental anguish. Genital mutilation is also painful and most possibly quite horrifying to those who have this practice inflicted on them. The key aspect of semantic contagion is not that it makes events and behaviors possible that were once impossible. Semantic contagion, by creating new ways of being a person and new descriptions for the way people act, contributes to our explanations as to why the act occurred and what the consequences will be. It seems that the description of the act can shape the consequences of the act.

== Acting under a description ==
The philosopher G. E. M. Anscombe wrote that a human action is intentional if the question 'Why,' taken in a certain sense (and evidently conceived as addressed to him), has application (Intention, par. 5-8). An agent can answer the 'why' question by giving a reason or purpose for her action. "To do Y" or "because I want to do Y" would be typical answers to this sort of "why?"; though they are not the only ones, they are crucial to the constitution of the phenomenon as a typical phenomenon of human life (sections 18-21). The agent's answer helps supply the descriptions under which the action is intentional. Anscombe was the first to clearly spell out that actions are intentional under some descriptions and not others. In her famous example, a man's action (which we might observe as consisting in moving an arm up and down while holding a handle) may be intentional under the description 'pumping water' but not under other descriptions such as 'contracting these muscles', 'tapping out this rhythm', and so on. Intentional actions are actions under a description.

The implications of this philosophy of intentional action were extended by Hacking in Rewriting the Soul. His argument is as follows: When we talk about people, we talk about ourselves as intentional beings. Our description of our acts are almost always descriptions of how an act was intended. We offer an explanation of why we act thus and so. The array of descriptions available to an individual depend on the descriptions available to the society in which the individual resides. Hence, the media, the expertise of psychologists, physicians and scientists and the folk understandings of cultural communities all provide descriptions that can be assumed by an individual in the moment that he or she acts. For example, a child pushes another child in the playground. If asked why did you do that, he might answer "to show who's boss," "because I have ADHD" or "because I was provoked." Hacking is not concerned with which description is true, but rather, how the descriptions under which people act depend on the descriptions available to them. “Action is action under a description”.

Moreover, descriptions change as our shared understanding of the meaning of the act changes. For example, if one sees a man spanking a child, or children playing “kiss chase” in the playground, the descriptions ascribed to the acts would most likely differ considerably to those of a Victorian gentleman. The contemporary acts of eating beef, reading philosophy and natural procreation may all have very different descriptions to a person in a future society: descriptions that assume different causes and different outcomes to those that we assume today.

The past is indeterminate, not because acts simply may or may not have happened, but because the ascribed causes of those acts is an ever-shifting account depending on the ebb and flow of descriptions that can be ascribed to those acts as the practices of society change. Acting under a description has important implications for our interpretation of different societies and different eras.

Acting under a description also has important implications for interpreting our selves. According to Hacking, selves are formed not only by our bio-physical constitution and the events we experience, but also by the descriptions we ascribe to the events that occur. These descriptions are often causal descriptions: explanations of how we have come to be the persons that we are. A person does not come to be the person that she is simply because the events of her past caused her to be this person. Rather, the descriptions attributed to events in the past are a formative influence on her being. These explanations are replete with meaning and causal attribution. We are substantially (though not entirely) the people we understand ourselves to be.

Hacking’s (1995) account of the emergence of multiple personality disorder is not simply an account of the events that led to the discovery of this disorder and a description of its manifestations. It is an investigation into the extent to which our descriptions of events – descriptions that often entail causal implications – have rippled through our societies and how these descriptions form new ways of being a person. The description itself, then, offers causal possibilities.

== See also ==
- Michel Foucault
- Nikolas Rose
