= Robb Moss =

American documentary filmmaker

Robb Moss is an American documentary filmmaker and chair of the Department of Visual and Environmental Studies at Harvard University. Notable works by Moss include the films Containment, The Same River Twice, Secrecy, and The Tourist. His films are often about the passage of time and its effect on characters, stories, and memories. His films have screened at various festivals.

== Early life ==
Moss was the first person in his family to attend college. While at UC Berkeley in the 1960s, he fell in love with motion pictures. Later, he studied at M.I.T. in the 1970's where he was a student of the pioneering documentary filmmakers Ed Pincus and Richard Leacock.

== River Film Trilogy ==
During the 1970s, Robb Moss acted as a river guide on the Colorado River with a group of friends: Barry, Jeff Golden, Cathy Shaw, Jim and Danny. They lived in a communal, nudist, naturalist lifestyle during this time. Moss began documenting these journeys on 16mm film in 1978, the first motion picture that came from these lyrical captures was ''Riverdogs'' (released in 1982). The film was made over a thirty-five day excursion through the Grand Canyon down the Colorado River.

Twenty years later, Moss released The Same River Twice, a sequel to Riverdogs. The follow-up tracks the lives of the same five characters, with Moss filming and commenting off camera. The group, now middle aged, have a different relationship with the natural world, themselves, each other and the Colorado River. The film premiered at the Sundance Film Festival and went on to be nominated for the Truer Than Fiction Award and the Grand Jury Prize at the 2004 Film Independent Spirit Awards.

Another two decades would pass before a third film in the trilogy would be released, with 2025's The Bend in the River. The film follows Barry, Jeff, Cathy, Jim, Danny and Moss himself as they enter old age, which proves to be a poignant juxtaposition with images from the previous films. The film premiered at the Telluride Film Festival and went on to screen at the True/False Film Festival, Woodstock Film Festival, Full Frame Documentary Film Festival and the Museum of the Moving Image.

== Other Projects ==
In 2008, Moss and Peter Galison directed Secrecy, which documents classified government secrets, state bureaucracy and the world government's ability to hide information from the public The film contains interviews with members of the Central Intelligence Agency and the National Security Agency. It premiered at the Sundance Film Festival.

Moss's project, Containment, is about the disposition of nuclear waste for now and for the next 10,000 years. Co-directed with Peter Galison, the film premiered at Full Frame in 2015.

== Academic Life ==
Robb Moss is a member of the Academy of Motion Picture Arts and Sciences. The Sundance Institute’s Doc Edit Labs have relied on Moss as a creative advisor since their inception in 2004. For eight years, he served as a Board Director for ITVS. For the past 40 years Moss has taught filmmaking at Harvard University, at one point he was the chair of the Department of Art, Film, and Visual Studies.
