= 2023 deaths in the United States (January–March) =

- Decades: 2000s; 2010s; 2020s; 2030s
- See also: History of the United States (2016–present); Timeline of United States history (2010–present); List of years in the United States

The following notable deaths in the United States occurred in January–March 2023. Names are reported under the date of death, in alphabetical order as set out in WP:NAMESORT. A typical entry reports information in the following sequence: Name, age, country of citizenship at birth and subsequent nationality (if applicable), what subject was noted for, year of birth (if known), and reference.

== January ==
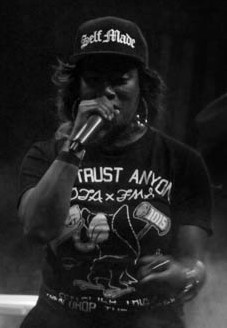
Gangsta Boo

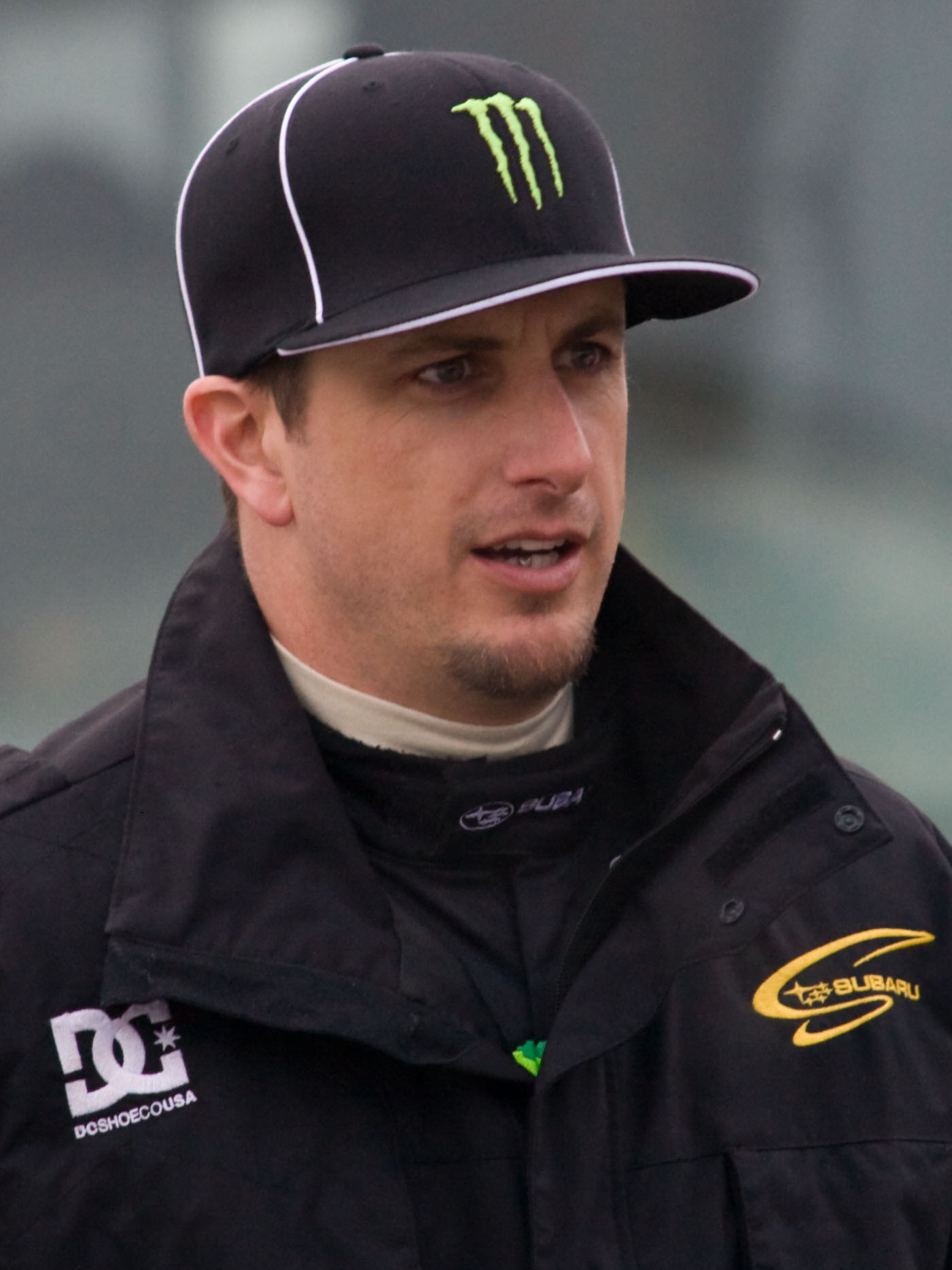
Ken Block

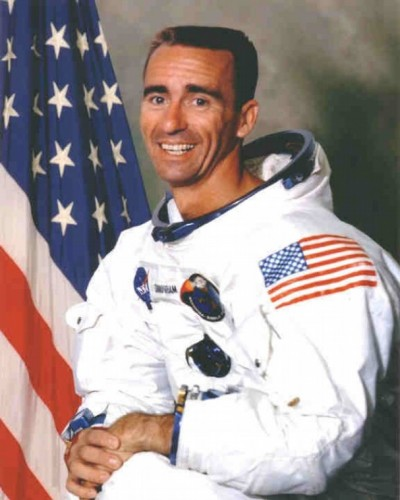
Walter Cunningham

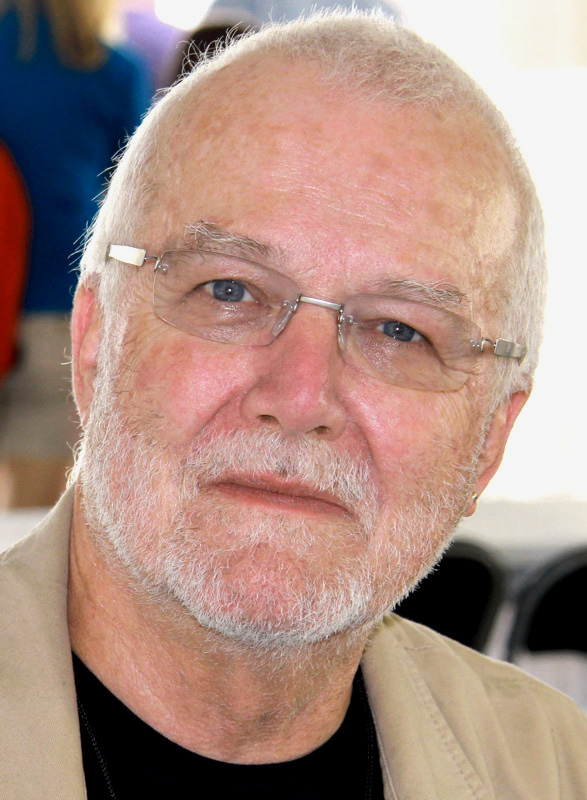
Russell Banks

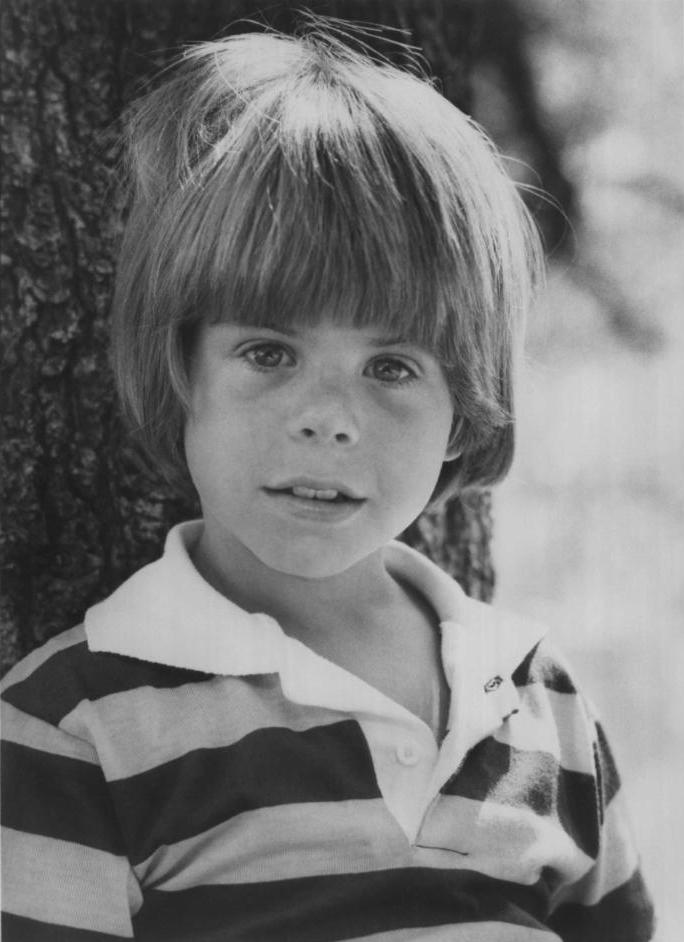
Adam Rich

Melinda Dillon

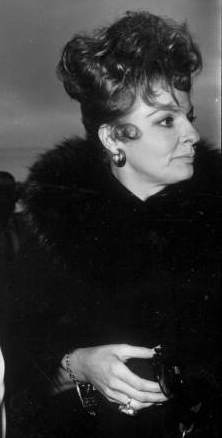
Carole Cook

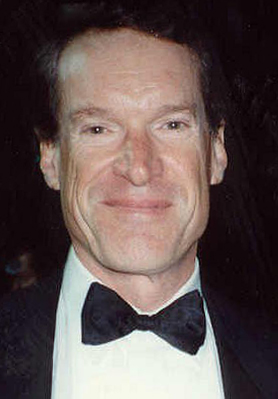
Charles Kimbrough

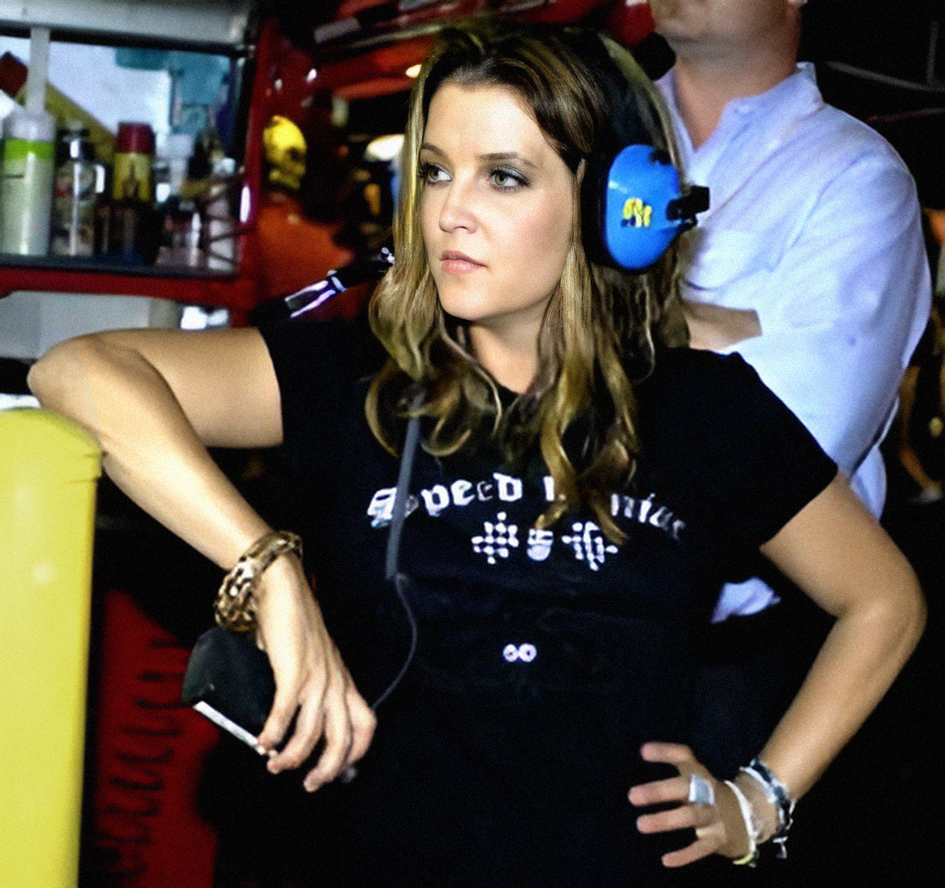
Lisa Marie Presley

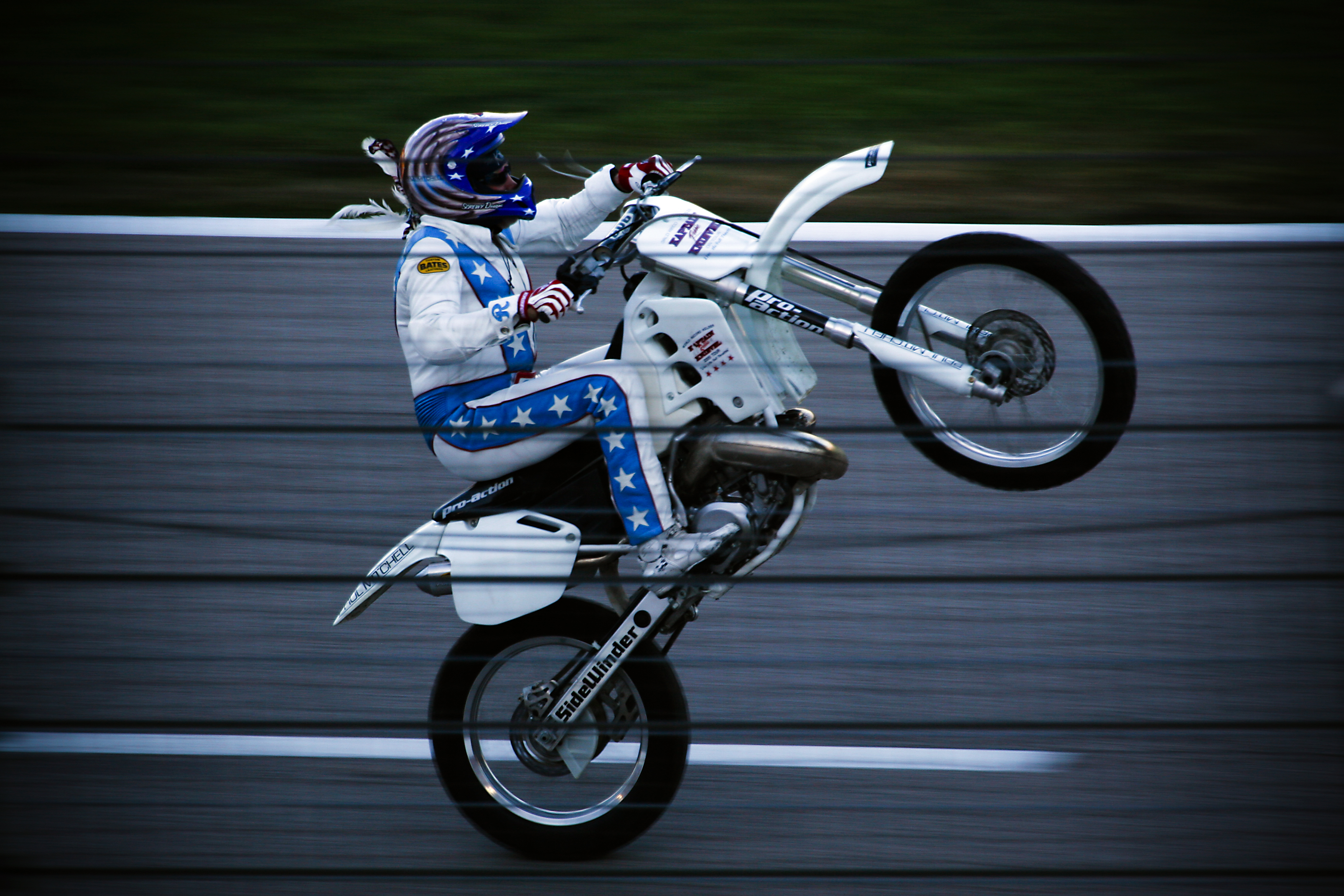
Robbie Knievel

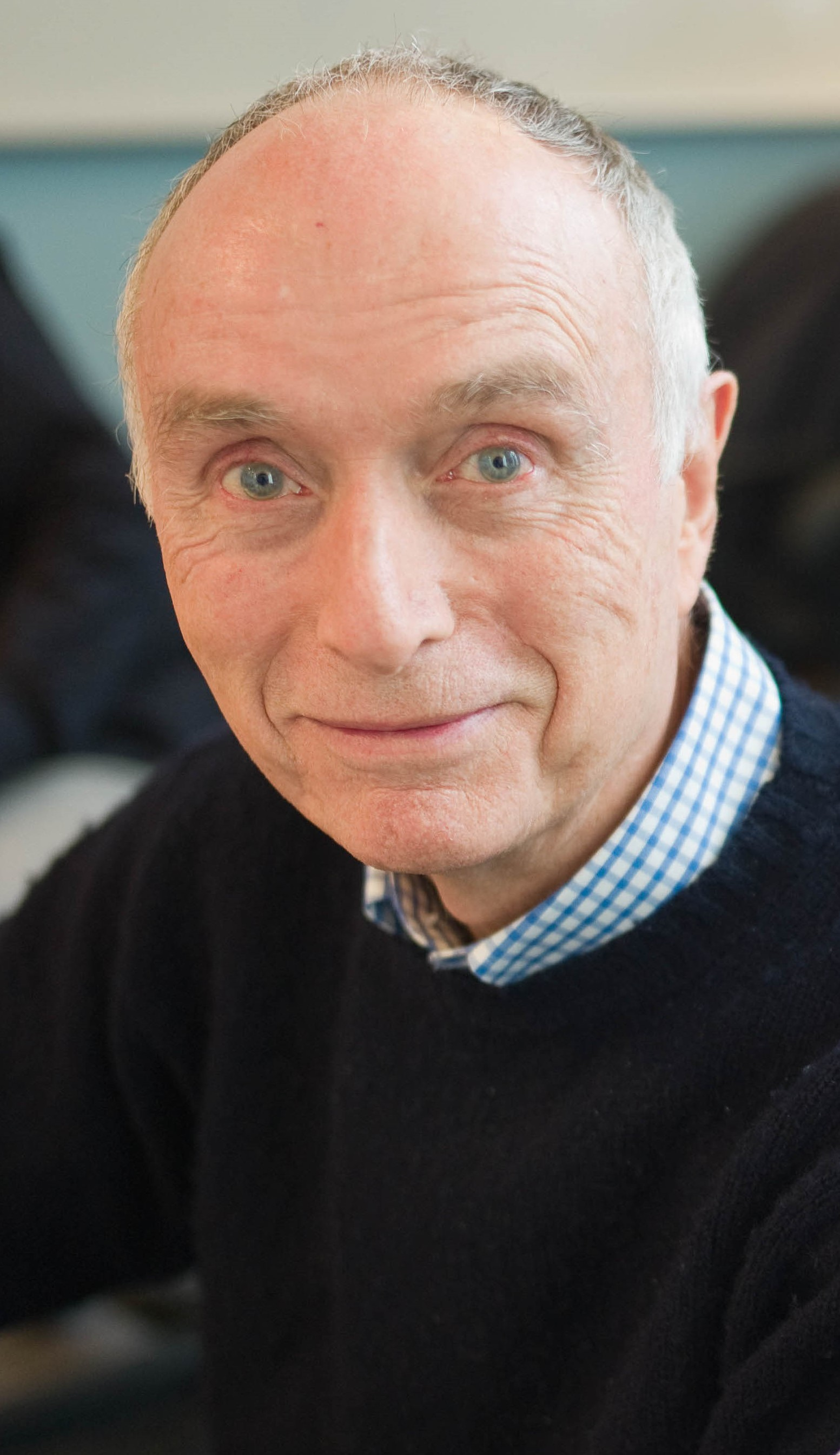
Lloyd Morrisett

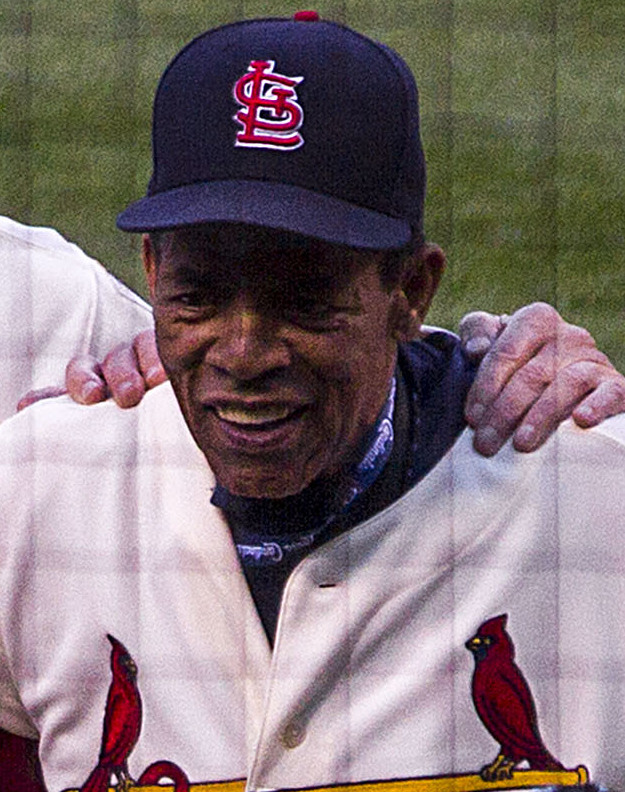
Ted Savage

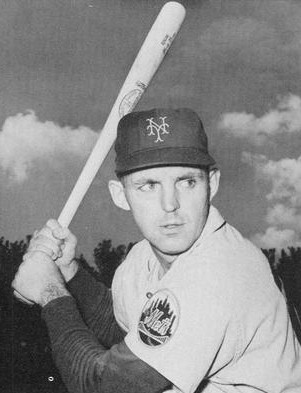
Frank Thomas

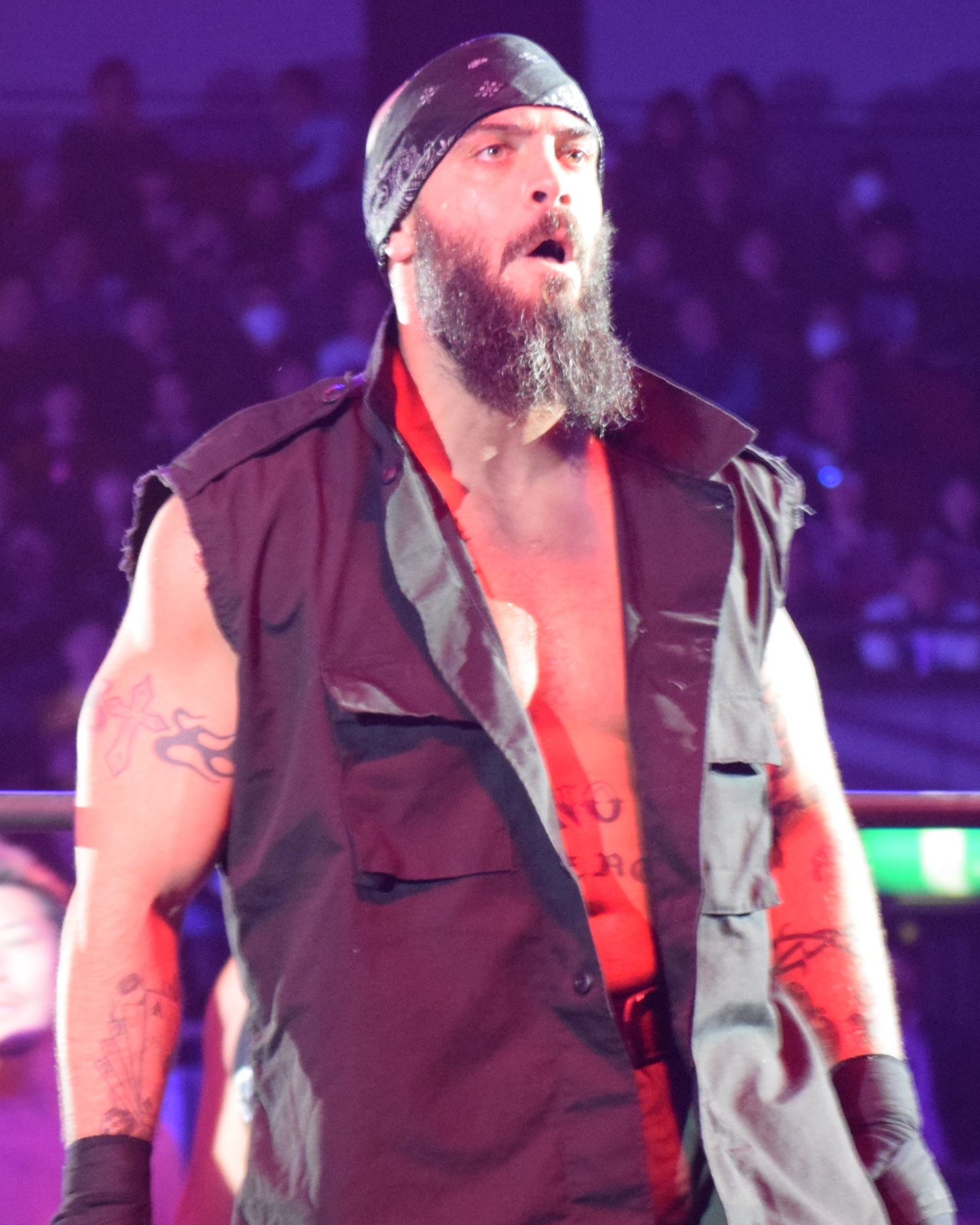
Jay Briscoe

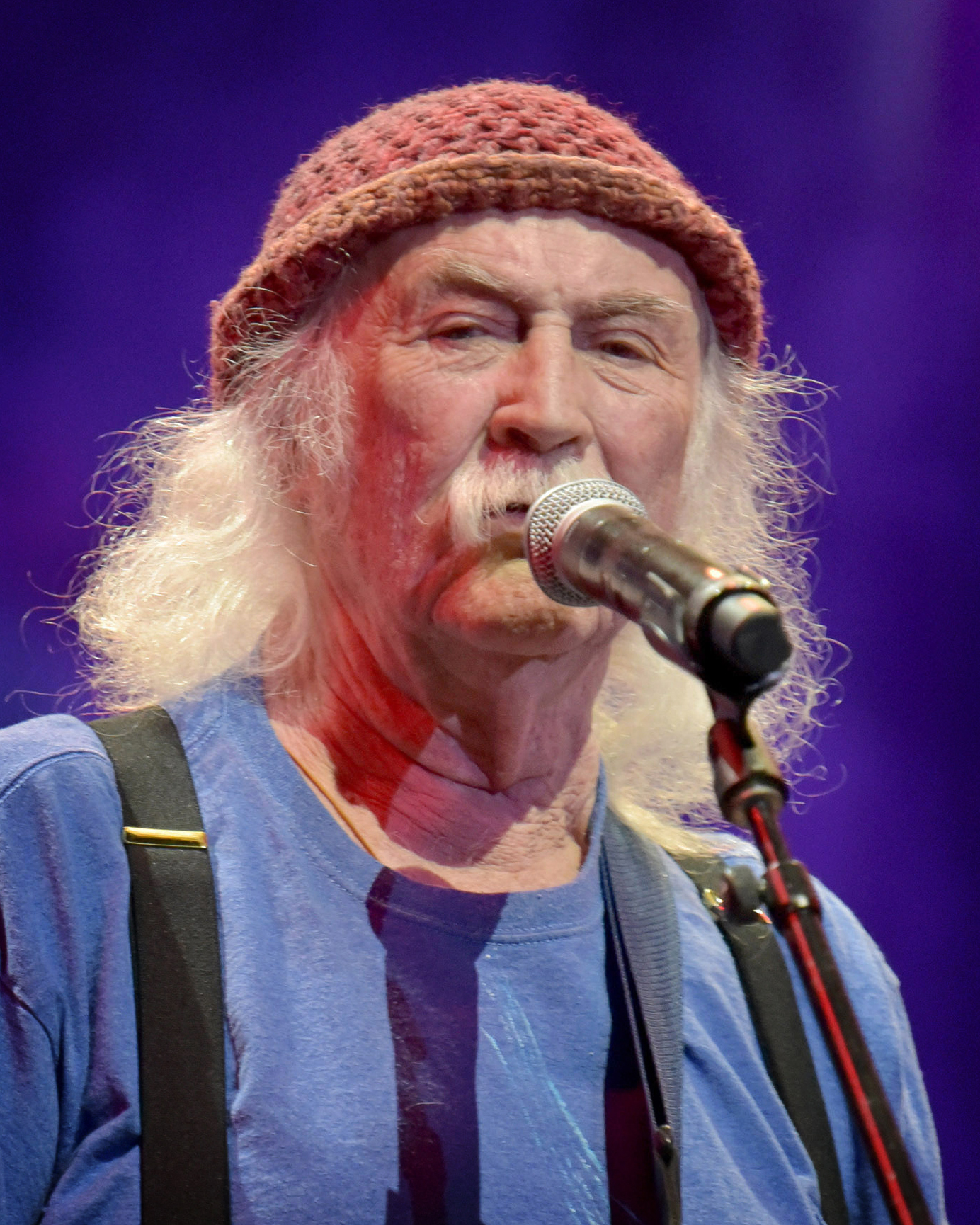
David Crosby

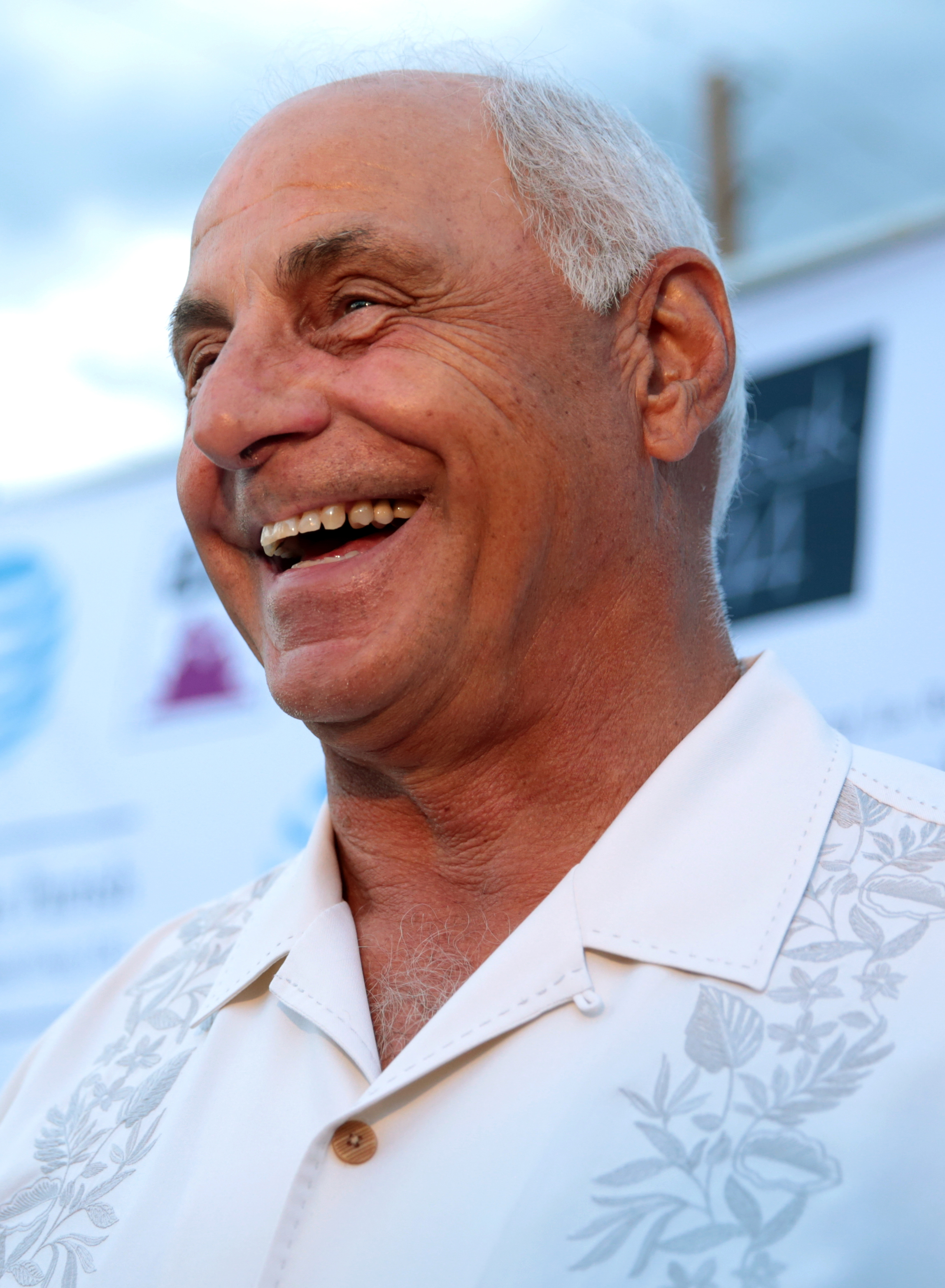
Sal Bando

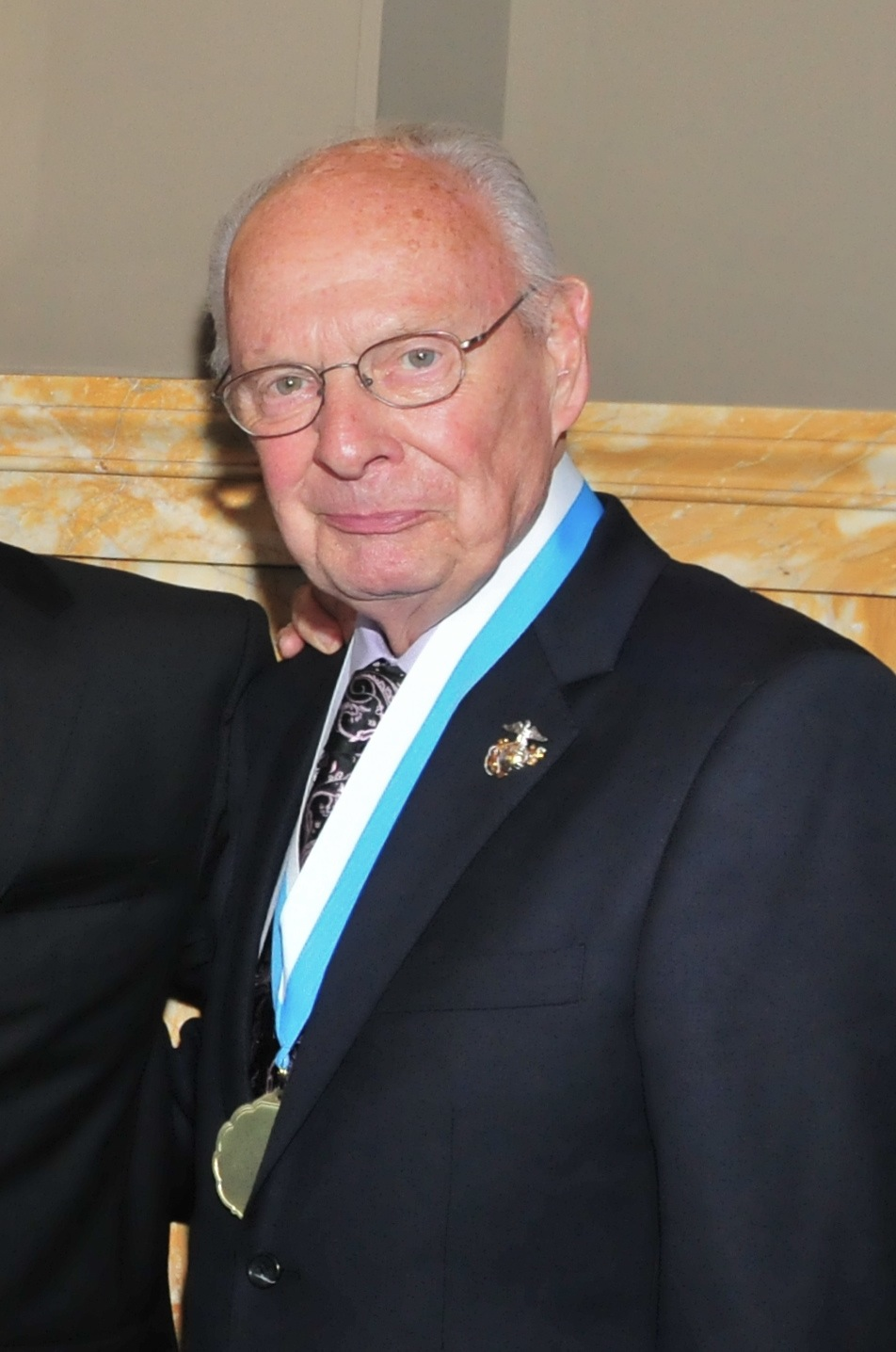
Bill Schonely

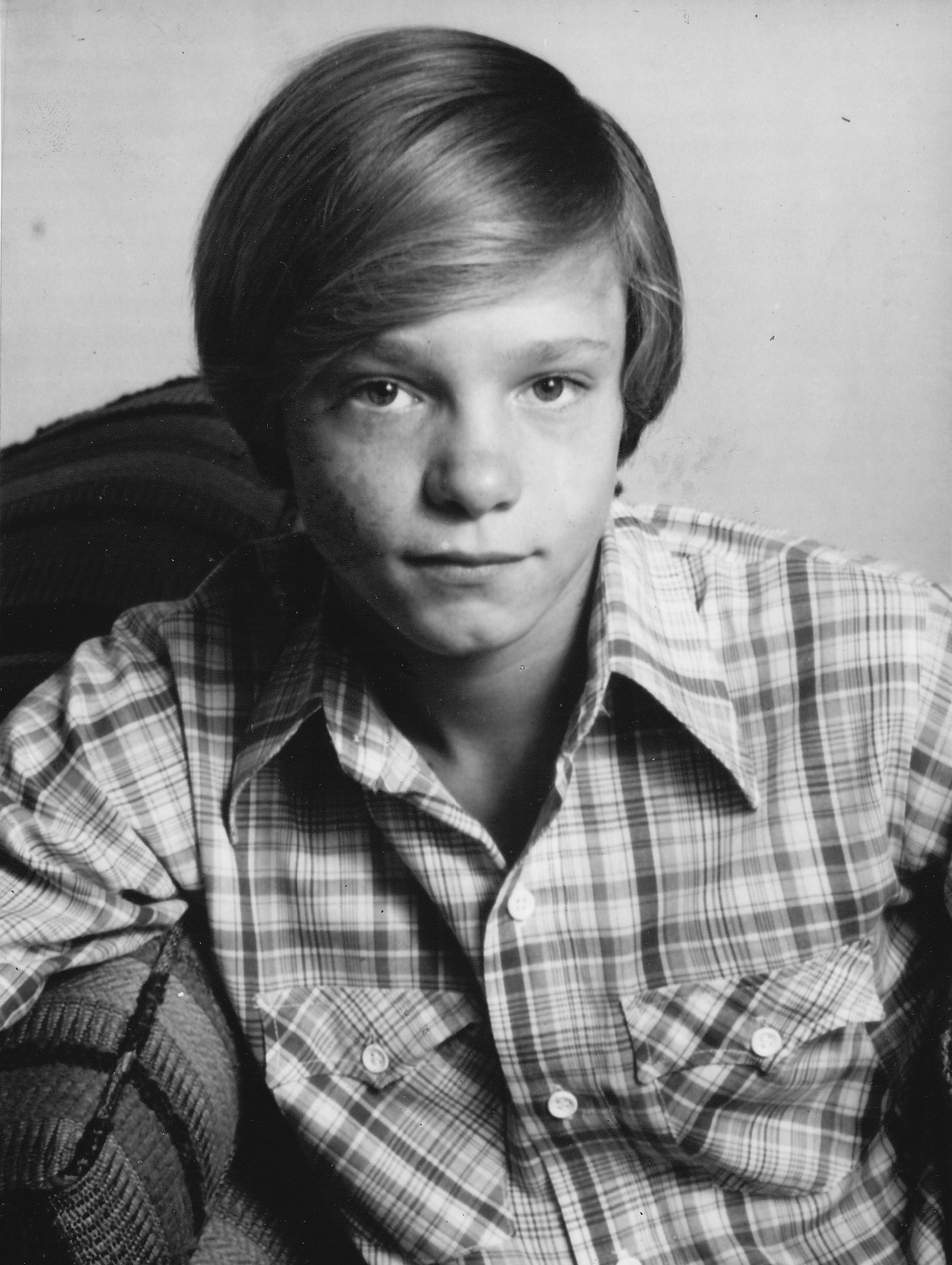
Lance Kerwin

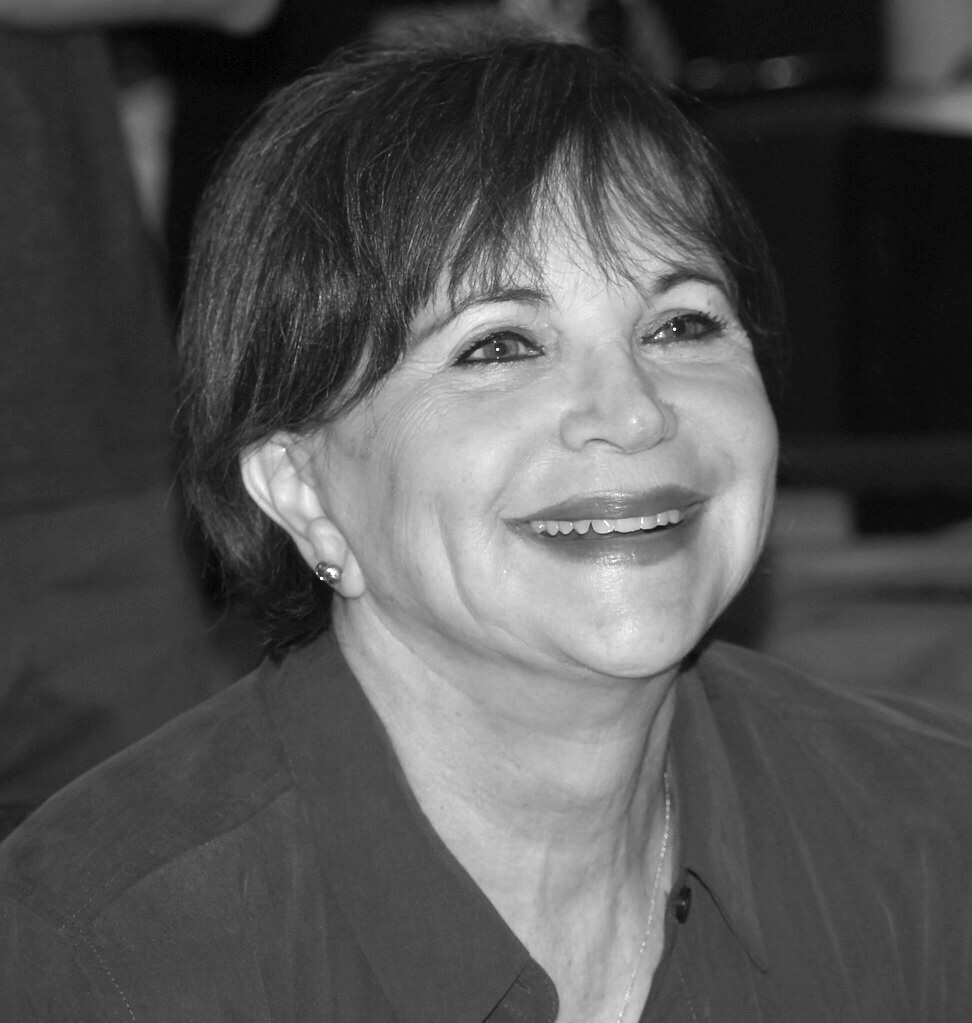
Cindy Williams

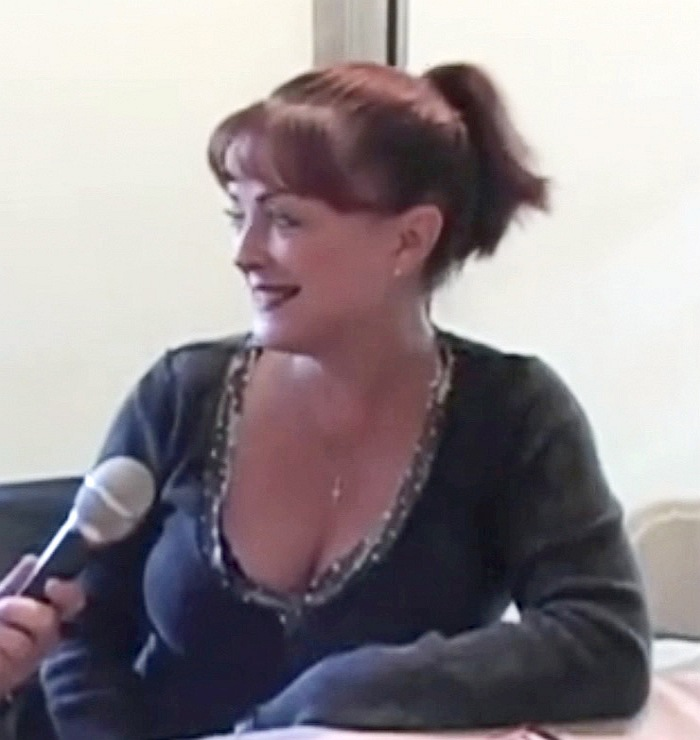
Lisa Loring

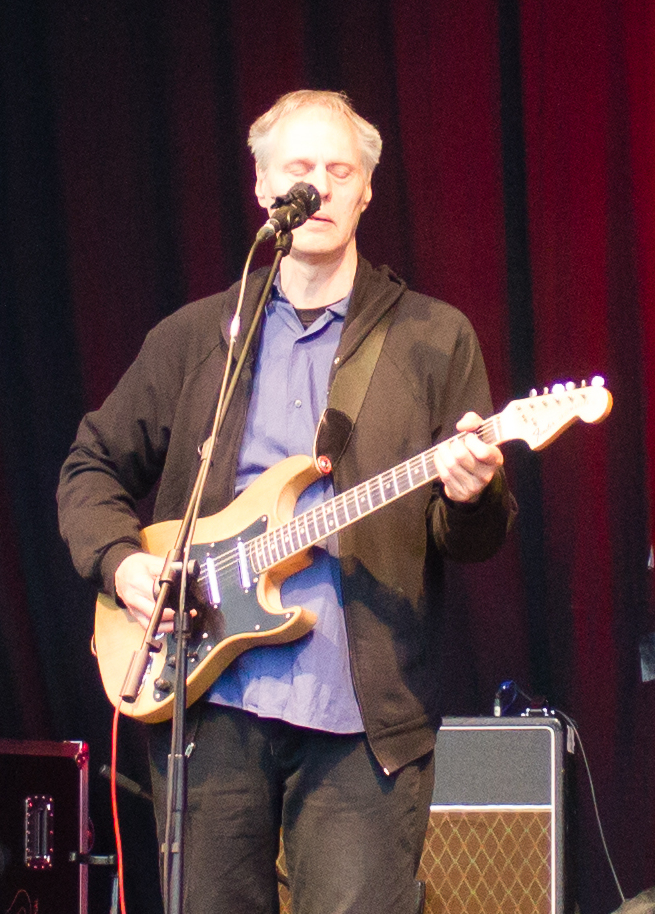
Tom Verlaine

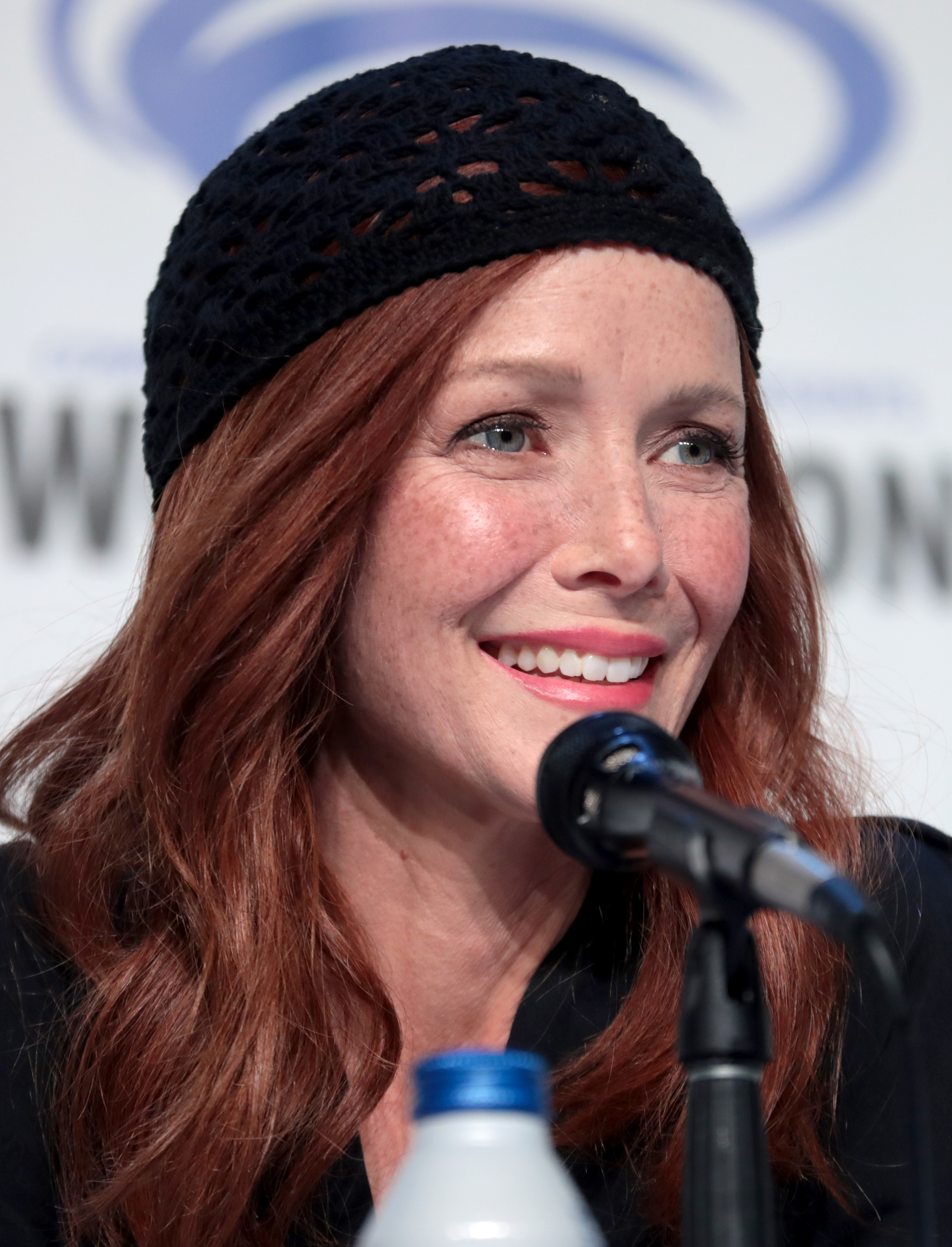
Annie Wersching

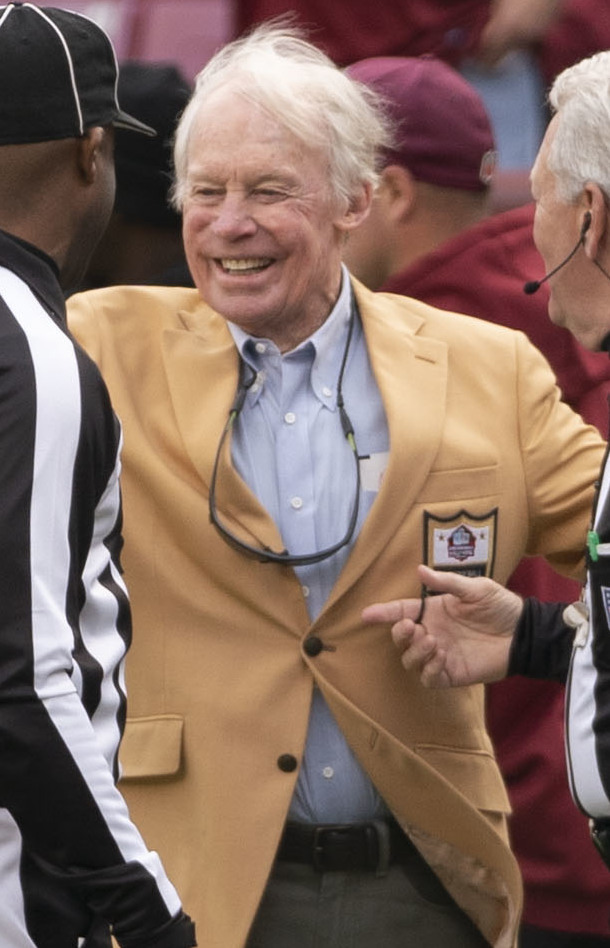
Bobby Beathard

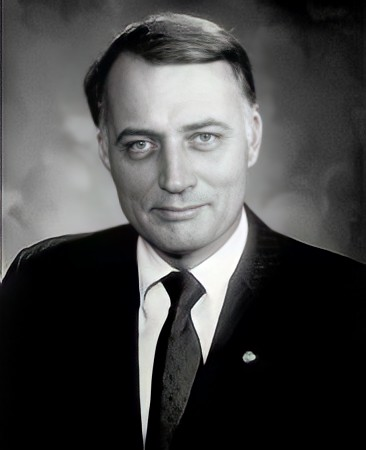
David Durenberger

- January 1
  - Martin Davis, 94, mathematician (Davis–Putnam algorithm) (b. 1928)
  - Gangsta Boo, 43, rapper (Three 6 Mafia) (b. 1979)
  - Edith Lank, 96, author and advice columnist (b. 1926)
  - Sebastian Marino, 57, guitarist (Overkill, Anvil) (b. 1965)
  - Art McNally, 97, Hall of Fame football official, director of officiating for the NFL (1968–1991) (b. 1925)
  - Kelly Monteith, 80, comedian (b. 1942)
  - Meenakshi Narain, 58, experimental physicist (b. 1964)
  - Edith Pearlman, 86, short story writer (b. 1936)
  - Fred White, 67, Hall of Fame drummer (Earth, Wind & Fire) (b. 1955)
- January 2
  - Lincoln Almond, 86, politician and lawyer, governor of Rhode Island (1995–2003), U.S. Attorney for the district of Rhode Island (1969–1978; 1981–1993) (b. 1936)
  - Ken Block, 55, professional rally driver (b. 1967)
  - Suzy McKee Charnas, 83, novelist (The Kingdom of Kevin Malone, The Holdfast Chronicles) and short story writer ("Boobs") (b. 1939)
  - Molly Corbett Broad, 81, academic administrator (b. 1941)
  - Buster Corley, 72, restaurateur, co-founder of Dave & Buster's (b. 1950)
  - Catherine David, 73, French-born literary critic and novelist (b. 1949)
  - Roxanne Donnery, 79, politician (b. 1943)
  - Cai Emmons, 71, author and blogger (b. 1951)
  - Frank Galati, 79, theatre director (The Grapes of Wrath, Ragtime) and screenwriter (The Accidental Tourist), Tony winner (1990) (b. 1943)
  - Cliff Gustafson, 91, baseball coach (Texas Longhorns) (b. 1931)
  - Bobby Hogue, 83, politician, member of the Arkansas House of Representatives (1979–1998) (b. 1939)
  - Thomas L. Hughes, 97, government official, director of the Bureau of Intelligence and Research (1963–1969) (b. 1925)
  - Marilyn Stafford, 97, American-born British photographer (b. 1925)
  - Robert Stephan, 89, lawyer, Kansas attorney general (1979–1995) (b. 1933)
- January 3
  - James D. Brubaker, 85, film producer (Bruce Almighty, Rocky, The Right Stuff) (b. 1937)
  - Walter Cunningham, 90, astronaut (Apollo 7) (b. 1932)
  - Bessie Hendricks, 115, supercentenarian (b. 1907)
  - Greta Kiernan, 89, politician, member of the New Jersey General Assembly (1978–1980) (b. 1933)
  - James Lowenstein, 95, diplomat, ambassador to Luxembourg (1977–1981) (b. 1927)
  - Frederick J. Marshall, 71, judge, justice of the New York Supreme Court (2000–2022) (b. 1951)
  - Robbie Pierce, 63, off-road racing driver (b. 1959)
  - Nate Thayer, 62, journalist (Far Eastern Economic Review, Jane's Defence Weekly, Soldier of Fortune) (b. 1960)
- January 4
  - Arthur Duncan, 97, tap dancer (The Lawrence Welk Show, The Betty White Show) (b. 1925)
  - Norman Fruchter, 85, writer and academic (b. 1937)
  - Casey Hayden, 85, civil rights activist (b. 1937)
  - Elwood Hillis, 96, politician, member of the U.S. House of Representatives (1971–1987) (b. 1926)
  - Stan Hitchcock, 86, country singer (b. 1936)
  - Miiko Taka, 97, actress (Sayonara) (b. 1925)
  - Calvin Muhammad, 64, football player (Los Angeles Raiders, Washington Redskins, San Diego Chargers) (b. 1958)
- January 5
  - Jack Bender, 91, cartoonist (Alley Oop) (b. 1931)
  - Earl Boen, 81, actor (Terminator, Monkey Island, Warcraft) (b. 1941)
  - Mark Capps, 54, sound engineer (b. 1968)
  - Nate Colbert, 76, baseball player (San Diego Padres, Houston Astros, Detroit Tigers) (b. 1946)
  - Carl Duser, 90, baseball player (Kansas City Athletics) (b. 1932)
  - Herbert Gintis, 82, economist, behavioral scientist and author (Schooling in Capitalist America) (b. 1940)
  - Gordy Harmon, 79, soul singer (The Whispers) (b. 1943)
  - Mike Hill, 73, film editor (Apollo 13, Rush, Frost/Nixon), Oscar winner (1996) (b. 1949)
  - Russell Pearce, 75, politician, member (2006–2011) and president (2011) of the Arizona Senate (b. 1947)
  - Dave Schubert, 49, street photographer (b. 1973)
  - Ruth Adler Schnee, 99, German-born textile designer and interior designer (b. 1923)
  - Quentin Williams, 39, politician, member of the Connecticut House of Representatives (since 2019) (b. 1983)
- January 6
  - Benjamin Bederson, 101, physicist (Manhattan Project) (b. 1921)
  - Fred Benners, 92, football player (New York Giants) (b. 1930)
  - Jeff Blackburn, 77, songwriter ("My My, Hey Hey (Out of the Blue)") and guitarist (Blackburn & Snow, Moby Grape) (b. 1945)
  - Bill Campbell, 74, baseball player (Minnesota Twins, Boston Red Sox, Chicago Cubs) (b. 1948)
  - Lew Hunter, 87, screenwriter and screenwriting teacher (b. 1935)
  - John Warren Johnson, 93, businessman and politician, member of the Minnesota House of Representatives (1966–1974) (b. 1929)
  - Danny Kaleikini, 85, Hawaiian entertainer and singer (b. 1937)
  - David S. Laustsen, 75, politician, member of the South Dakota House of Representatives (1977–1984) and senate (1985–1987) (b. 1947)
  - Annette McCarthy, 64, actress (Twin Peaks, Creature, Baywatch) (b. 1958)
  - Frank Molden, 80, football player (Los Angeles Rams, Philadelphia Eagles, New York Giants) (b. 1942)
  - Theodore R. Newman Jr., 88, jurist, judge (1976–2016) and chief judge (1976–1984) of the D.C. Court of Appeals, judge of the Superior Court of D.C. (1970–1976) (b. 1934)
  - Owen Roizman, 86, cinematographer (The Exorcist, Network, The French Connection) (b. 1936)
  - Dick Savitt, 95, Hall of Fame tennis player (b. 1927)
- January 7
  - Russell Banks, 82, novelist (Continental Drift, The Sweet Hereafter, Cloudsplitter) (b. 1940)
  - Joseph A. Hardy III, 100, lumber industry executive, founder of 84 Lumber (b. 1923)
  - Mary Ellen Hawkins, 99, politician, member of the Florida House of Representatives (1974–1994) (b. 1923)
  - Naomi Replansky, 104, poet (b. 1918)
  - Adam Rich, 54, actor (Eight Is Enough, Dungeons & Dragons, The Devil and Max Devlin) (b. 1968)
  - Dorothy Tristan, 88, actress (Klute, Scarecrow) and screenwriter (Weeds) (b. 1934)
- January 8
  - Charles David Allis, 71, molecular biologist (b. 1951)
  - Lynnette Hardaway, 51, conservative activist (Diamond and Silk) (b. 1971)
  - Jack W. Hayford, 88, Pentecostal minister and hymn writer, founder of The King's University (b. 1934)
  - Bernard Kalb, 100, journalist (Reliable Sources, The New York Times), assistant secretary of state for public affairs (1985–1986) (b. 1922)
- January 9
  - Les Brown Jr., 82, musician, actor and producer (b. 1940)
  - William Consovoy, 48, attorney (b. 1974)
  - Melinda Dillon, 83, actress (Close Encounters of the Third Kind, A Christmas Story, Absence of Malice) (b. 1939)
  - Ahmaad Galloway, 42, football player (Scottish Claymores, San Diego Chargers, Frankfurt Galaxy) (b. 1980)
  - Virginia Kraft Payson, 92, thoroughbred horse breeder and sports journalist (Sports Illustrated) (b. 1930)
  - Cincy Powell, 80, basketball player (Dallas Chaparrals, Kentucky Colonels, Virginia Squires) (b. 1942)
  - Charles Simic, 84, Serbian-born poet (b. 1938)
  - George S. Zimbel, 93, American-Canadian documentary photographer (b. 1929)
- January 10
  - Donald Blom, 73, murderer (b. 1949)
  - Dennis Budimir, 84, jazz and rock guitarist (The Wrecking Crew) (b. 1938)
  - István Deák, 96, Hungarian-born historian, member of the Hungarian Academy of Sciences (b. 1926)
  - Jeff Hamilton, 56, Olympic skier (b. 1966)
  - Blake Hounshell, 44, journalist (b. 1978)
  - Tyre Nichols, 29, delivery driver, subject of Tyre Nichols protests (b. 1993)
  - Roy Schwitters, 78, physicist (b. 1944)
  - Christopher T. Walsh, 78, biochemist, member of the National Academy of Sciences (b. 1944)
- January 11
  - Peter Campbell, 62, water polo player, twice Olympic silver medallist (1984, 1988) (b. 1960)
  - Carole Cook, 98, actress (The Lucy Show, The Incredible Mr. Limpet, Home on the Range), Sixteen Candles (b. 1924)
  - Harriet Hall, 77, air force flight surgeon (b. 1945)
  - Charles Kimbrough, 86, actor (Murphy Brown, The Hunchback of Notre Dame) (b. 1936)
  - Ben Masters, 75, actor (All That Jazz, Dream Lover, Passions) (b. 1947)
  - Eli Ostreicher, 39, British-born serial entrepreneur (b. 1983)
  - Charles White, 64, football player (Cleveland Browns, Los Angeles Rams), Heisman Trophy winner (1979) (b. 1958)
- January 12
  - Harold Brown, 98, Air Force officer (Tuskegee Airmen) (b. 1924)
  - David Doctorian, 88, politician, member of the Missouri Senate (1977–1991) (b. 1934)
  - Lisa Marie Presley, 54, singer-songwriter ("Lights Out"), and daughter of Elvis Presley (b. 1968)
  - Lee Tinsley, 53, baseball player (Boston Red Sox, Seattle Mariners, Philadelphia Phillies) (b. 1969)
  - Charles Treger, 87, violinist (b. 1935)
  - Charlotte Vale-Allen, 81, Canadian-born contemporary fiction writer (b. 1941)
  - Elliot Valenstein, 99, neuroscientist and psychologist (b. 1923)
  - Bobby Wood, 87, politician, member of the Tennessee House of Representatives (1976–2004) (b. 1935)
- January 13
  - Al Brown, 83, actor (The Wire) (b. 1939)
  - Bill Davis, 80, baseball player (Cleveland Indians, San Diego Padres) (b. 1942)
  - Robbie Knievel, 60, daredevil and stuntman (b. 1962)
  - James L. Morse, 82, jurist, justice of the Vermont Supreme Court (1988–2003) (b. 1940)
  - Thomasina Winslow, 57, blues musician (b. 1965)
  - Yoshio Yoda, 88, Japanese-born actor (McHale's Navy) (b. 1934)
- January 14
  - Keith Beaton, 72, singer (Blue Magic) (b. 1950) (death announced on this date)
  - Wally Campo, 99, actor (Machine-Gun Kelly, The Little Shop of Horrors, Master of the World) (b. 1923)
  - Craig Lowe, 65, politician, mayor of Gainesville (2010–2013) (b. 1957)
- January 15
  - Ed Beard, 83, football player (San Francisco 49ers) (b. 1939)
  - Victoria Chick, 86, economist (b. 1936)
  - C. J. Harris, 31, singer (American Idol) (b. 1991).
  - George McLeod, 92, basketball player (Baltimore Bullets) (b. 1931)
  - Lloyd Morrisett, 93, psychologist and television producer (Sesame Street) (b. 1929)
  - Ted Savage, 86, baseball player (St. Louis Cardinals, Chicago Cubs, Los Angeles Dodgers) (b. 1936)
  - Jean Veloz, 98, dancer and actress (Swing Fever, Where Are Your Children?, Jive Junction) (b. 1924)
- January 16
  - Johnny Powers, 84, rockabilly singer and guitarist (b. 1938)
  - Arthur Ravenel Jr., 95, politician, member of the South Carolina House of Representatives and Senate, member of the U.S. House of Representatives (1987–1995) (b. 1927)
  - Lupe Serrano, 92, Chilean-born ballerina (b. 1930)
  - Rasul Siddik, 73, jazz trumpeter (b. 1949)
  - Gary Smith, 64, record producer (b. 1958)
  - Jean-Pierre Swings, 79, American-born Belgian astronomer (b. 1943)
  - Frank Thomas, 93, baseball player (New York Mets, Pittsburgh Pirates, Philadelphia Phillies) (b. 1929)
- January 17
  - Jay Briscoe, 38, professional wrestler (ROH, CZW, NJPW) (b. 1984)
  - John Bura, 78, Ukrainian Greek Catholic hierarch, auxiliary bishop of Philadelphia (2006–2019) (b. 1944)
  - Van Conner, 55, bass guitarist (Screaming Trees) (b. 1967)
  - Jerome R. Cox Jr., 97, computer pioneer, scientist and entrepreneur (b. 1925)
  - T.J. deBlois, 38, drummer (A Life Once Lost) (b. 1984)
  - Maria Dworzecka, 81, Polish-born physicist and Holocaust survivor (b. 1941)
  - Chris Ford, 74, basketball player and coach (Detroit Pistons, Boston Celtics), NBA champion (1981) (b. 1948)
  - William Thomas Hart, 93, jurist, judge of the U.S. District Court for Northern Illinois (since 1982)(b. 1929)
  - Edward R. Pressman, 79, film producer (American Psycho, Conan the Barbarian) (b. 1943)
  - Sandra Seacat, 86, acting coach (Andrew Garfield, Laura Dern) and actress (Under the Banner of Heaven) (b. 1936)
- January 18
  - Donn Cambern, 93, film editor (Easy Rider, Romancing the Stone) (b. 1929)
  - David Crosby, 81, Hall of Fame singer (The Byrds, Crosby, Stills, Nash & Young) and songwriter ("Almost Cut My Hair") (b. 1941)
  - Robert Hersh, 82, lawyer (b. 1940)
- January 19
  - Carin Goldberg, 69, graphic designer (b. 1953)
  - Anton Walkes, 25, Charlotte FC English soccer player (b. 1997)
  - George Rose, 81, football player (Minnesota Vikings, New Orleans Saints) (b. 1942)
  - Ginger Stanley, 91, model, actress and stunt woman (Creature from the Black Lagoon, Jupiter's Darling, Revenge of the Creature) (b. 1931)
  - Betty Lee Sung, 98, activist, author and academic (b. 1924)
  - Bruce W. White, 70, businessman, founder of White Lodging (b. 1952)
- January 20
  - Sal Bando, 78, College Hall of Fame baseball player (Kansas City/Oakland Athletics, Milwaukee Brewers), World Series champion (1972, 1973, 1974) (b. 1944)
  - Ted Bell, 76, novelist (b. 1947)
  - Tom Birmingham, 73, politician, member (1991–2002) and president (1996–2002) of the Massachusetts Senate (b. 1949)
  - Jerry Blavat, 82, DJ and radio presenter (b. 1940)
  - Gwen Knapp, 61, sports journalist (The Philadelphia Inquirer, San Francisco Chronicle, The New York Times) (b. 1961)
  - Paul LaFarge, 52, novelist, essayist and academic (b. 1970)
  - Michaela Paetsch, 61, violinist (b. 1961)
  - Richard Steadman, 85, surgeon (b. 1937)
  - Howard M. Tesher, 90, Thoroughbred horse racing trainer (b. 1932)
  - Tom Villa, 77, politician, member of the Missouri House of Representatives (1974–1984, 2000–2008) (b. 1945)
- January 21
  - B.G., the Prince of Rap, 57, rapper and Eurodance artist ("The Colour of My Dreams", "Can We Get Enough?") (b. 1965)
  - Gary Pettigrew, 78, football player (Philadelphia Eagles, New York Giants) (b. 1944)
  - Sal Piro, 72, fan club president (The Rocky Horror Picture Show) and author (Creatures of the Night) (b. 1950)
  - Bill Schonely, 93, sports broadcaster (Portland Trail Blazers) (b. 1929)
- January 22
  - Easley Blackwood Jr., 89, composer (Twelve Microtonal Etudes for Electronic Music Media), pianist, and professor (b. 1933)
  - Lin Brehmer, 68, disc jockey and radio personality (WXRT) (b. 1954)
  - Matthew H. Clark, 85, Roman Catholic prelate, bishop of Rochester (1979–2012) (b. 1937)
  - Octaviano Juarez Corro, 49, Mexican-born fugitive (b. 1973)
  - Sam Bass Warner Jr., 94, historian (b. 1928)
- January 23
  - George Crabtree, 78, physicist (b. 1944)
  - William Lawvere, 85, mathematician (b. 1937)
  - Victor Navasky, 90, journalist (The Nation, Monocle, The New York Times Magazine) (b. 1932)
  - Everett Quinton, 71, actor (Natural Born Killers, Pollock, Bros) (b. 1952)
  - Carol Sloane, 85, jazz singer (b. 1937)
  - Jean Anderson, 93, cookbook author (b. 1929)
- January 24
  - Lance Kerwin, 62, actor (James at 15, The Loneliest Runner, Salem's Lot) (b. 1960)
  - Mira Lehr, 88, artist (b. 1934)
  - Jackson Rohm, 51, singer-songwriter (b. 1971)
- January 25
  - Bernhard T. Mittemeyer, 92, lieutenant general (b. 1930)
  - Willie Richardson, 74, civil rights activist (b. 1948)
  - Cindy Williams, 75, actress (Happy Days, Laverne & Shirley, American Graffiti) (b. 1947)
- January 26
  - Dave Albright, 63, football player (Saskatchewan Roughriders) (b. 1960)
  - Dean Daughtry, 76, keyboard player (Classics IV, Atlanta Rhythm Section) (b. 1946)
  - Jessie Lemonier, 25, football player (Los Angeles Chargers, Detroit Lions) (b. 1997)
  - Peter McCann, 74, songwriter ("Do You Wanna Make Love", "Right Time of the Night") and musician (b. 1948)
  - Billy Packer, 82, sports broadcaster and analyst (ACC, NCAA Final Four) (b. 1940)
  - Gary Peters, 85, baseball player (Chicago White Sox, Boston Red Sox) (b. 1937)
  - Allan Ryan, 77, attorney (b. 1945)
  - Alice Wolf, 89, Austrian-born politician, member of the Massachusetts House of Representatives (1996–2013) (b. 1933)
- January 27
  - Marcia G. Cooke, 68, jurist, judge on the U.S. District Court for the Southern District of Florida (since 2004) (b. 1954)
  - Robert Dalva, 80, film editor (The Black Stallion, Captain America: The First Avenger, Jumanji) (b. 1942)
  - Gregory Allen Howard, 70, screenwriter and film producer (Remember the Titans, Ali, Harriet) (b. 1952)
  - Alfred Leslie, 95, painter and film director (Pull My Daisy) (b. 1927)
  - Daniel Lewis Williams, 73, operatic basso profondo, (b. 1949)
- January 28
  - Hilda Bettermann, 80, politician, member of the Minnesota House of Representatives (1991–1999) (b. 1942)
  - Garth Everett, 69, politician, member of the Pennsylvania House of Representatives (2007–2020) (b. 1954)
  - Kent Lockhart, 59, American-born Australian basketball player (Eastside Spectres, Albany Patroons) (b. 1963)
  - Lisa Loring, 64, actress (The Addams Family) (b. 1958)
  - Dan Ramos, 41, politician, member of the Ohio House of Representatives (2011–2019) (b. 1981)
  - Barrett Strong, 81, singer ("Money (That's What I Want)") and songwriter ("I Heard It Through the Grapevine", "Papa Was a Rollin' Stone") (b. 1941)
  - Sidney Thornton, 68, football player (Pittsburgh Steelers) (b. 1954)
  - Tom Verlaine, 73, musician (Television) and songwriter ("Marquee Moon", "Prove It") (b. 1949)
- January 29
  - Bob Born, 98, candy manufacturer (Peeps), inventor of Hot Tamales (b. 1924)
  - Henry Moore, 88, football player (New York Giants, Baltimore Colts) (b. 1934)
  - John D. Morris, 76, creationist, president of the Institute for Creation Research (1996–2020) (b. 1946)
  - Roger Schank, 76, artificial intelligence theorist (b. 1946)
  - Kyle Smaine, 31, freestyle skier (b. 1991)
  - Will Steffen, 75, American-born Australian climatologist and chemist (b. 1947)
  - Annie Wersching, 45, actress (24, The Last of Us, Runaways) (b. 1977)
- January 30
  - John Adams, 71, baseball superfan (Cleveland Guardians) and drummer (b. 1951)
  - Bobby Beathard, 86, Pro Football Hall of Fame executive (b. 1937)
  - Pat Bunch, 83, country music songwriter ("I'll Still Be Loving You", "Wild One", "Living in a Moment") (b. 1939)
  - John Bailey Jones, 95, judge (b. 1927)
  - Ann McLaughlin Korologos, 81, politician, U.S. secretary of labor (1987–1989) (b. 1941)
  - Linda Pastan, 90, poet (b. 1932)
  - Mike Schrunk, 80, district attorney (b. 1942)
  - Charles Silverstein, 87, writer (The Joy of Gay Sex), therapist and gay activist (b. 1935)
  - Pedo Terlaje, 76, politician, member of the Legislature of Guam (since 2019) (b. 1946)
  - James Alexander Thom, 89, author (b. 1933)
  - Jeff Vlaming, 63, television writer and producer (The X-Files, Lois & Clark: The New Adventures of Superman, Northern Exposure and Hannibal) (b. 1959/1960) (death announced on this date)
- January 31
  - Cleve Bryant, 75, college football player (Ohio Bobcats) and coach (Illinois Fighting Illini, Texas Longhorns) (b. 1947)
  - Lou Campanelli, 84, basketball coach (James Madison Dukes, California Golden Bears) (b. 1938)
  - David Durenberger, 88, politician, member of the U.S. Senate (1978–1995) (b. 1934)
  - Dave Elder, 47, baseball player (Cleveland Indians) (b. 1975)
  - Donnie Marsico, 68, singer (The Jaggerz) (b. 1954)
  - Joe Moss, 92, football player (Washington Redskins) and coach (Philadelphia Eagles, Toronto Argonauts) (b. 1930)
  - Charlie Thomas, 85, Hall of Fame singer (The Drifters) (b. 1937) (death announced on this date)

== February ==
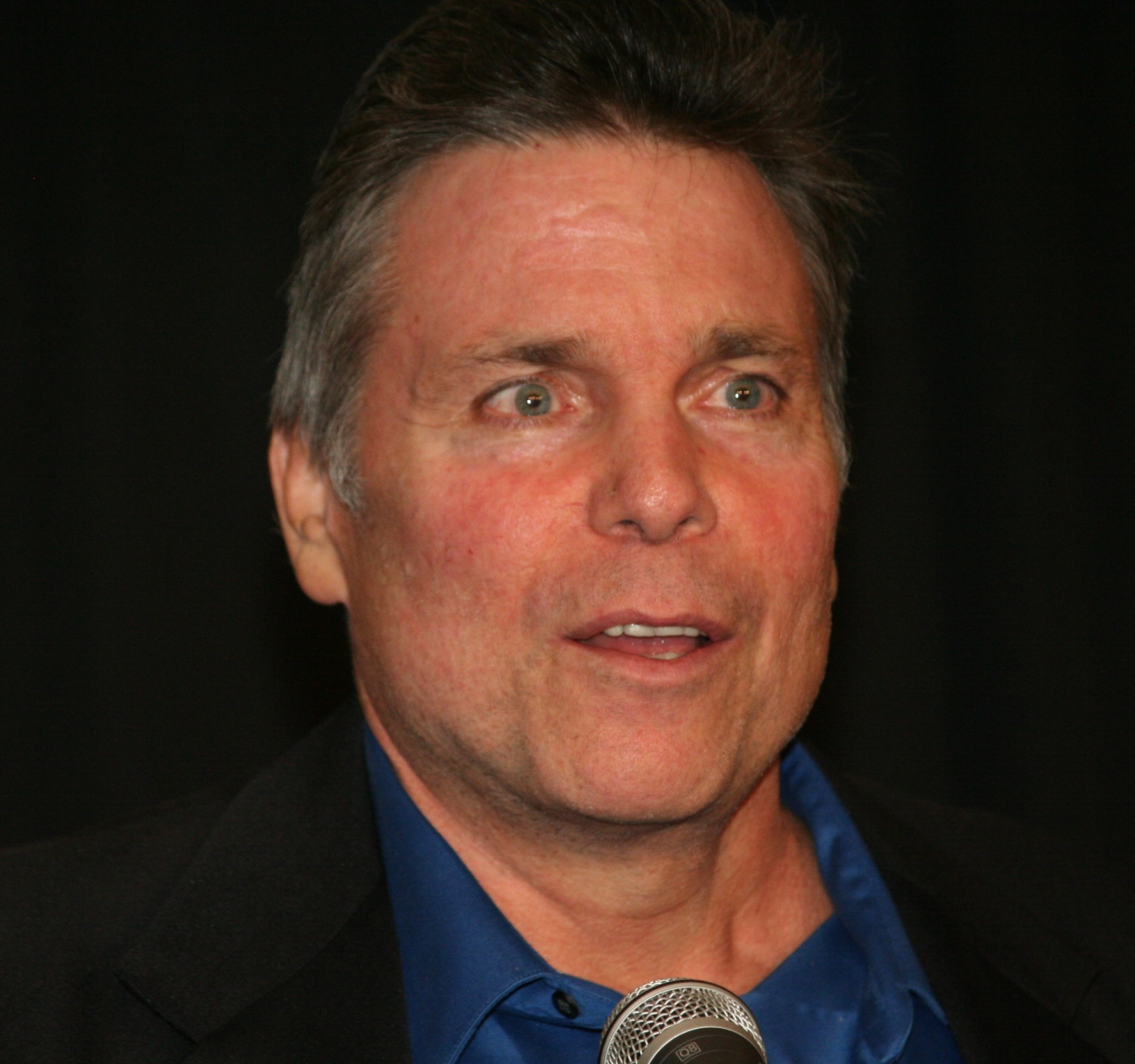
Lanny Poffo

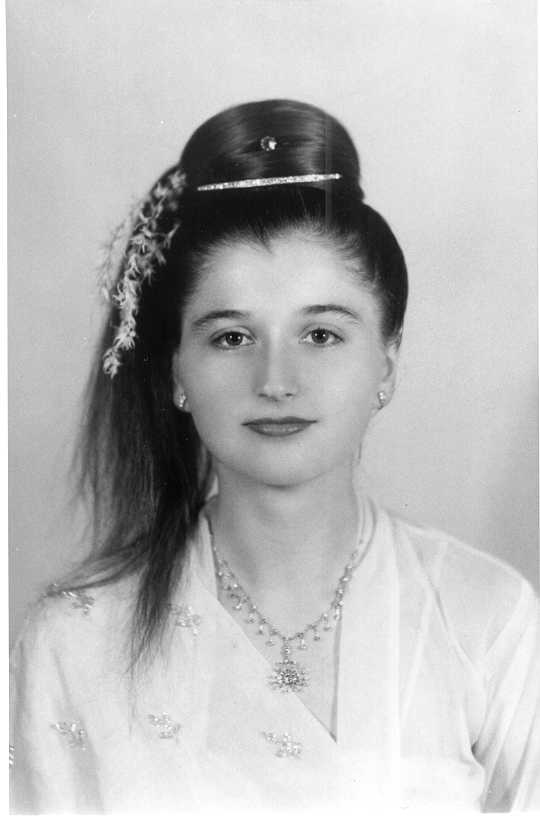
Inge Sargent

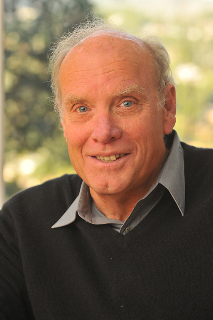
David Harris

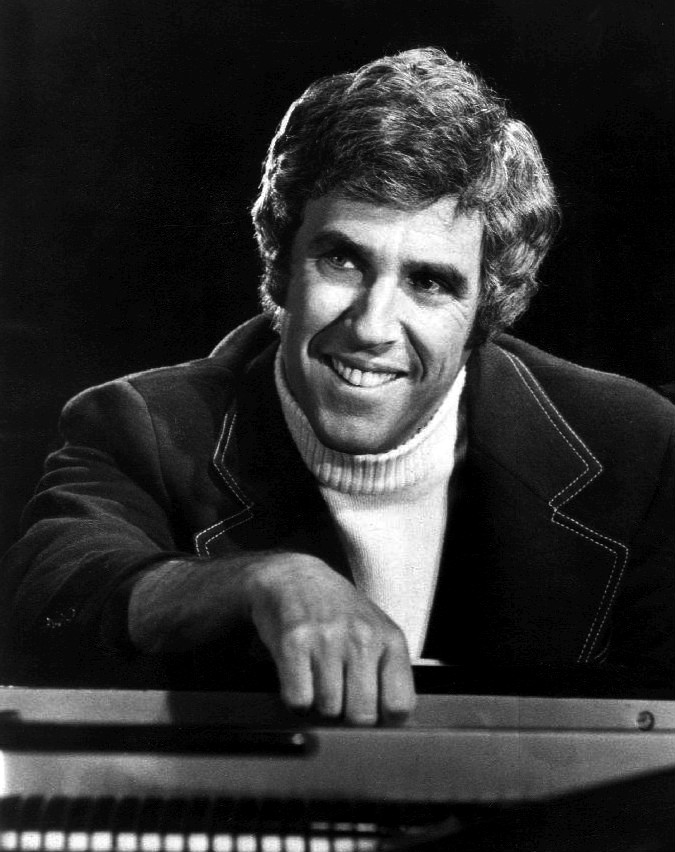
Burt Bacharach

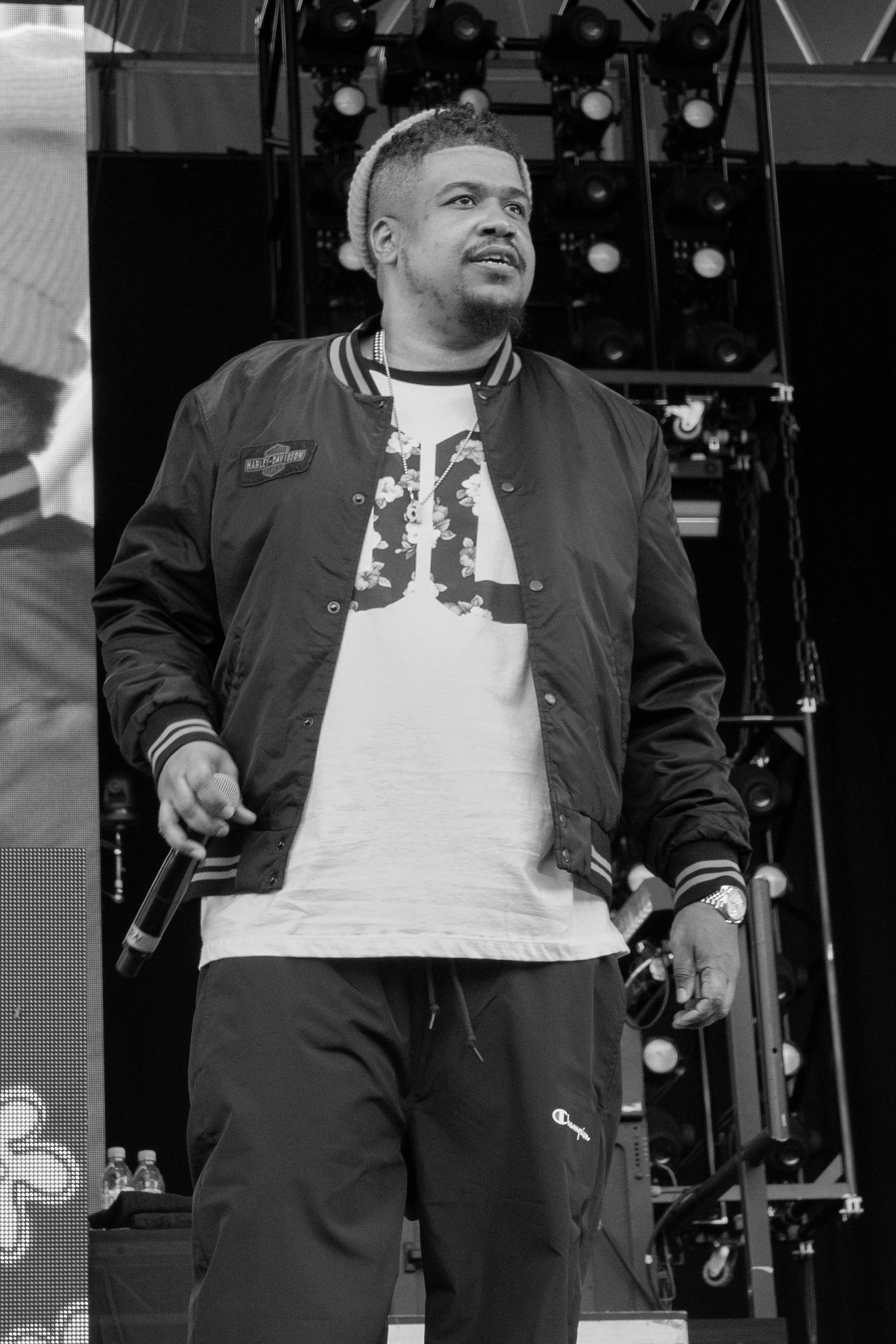
David Jolicoeur

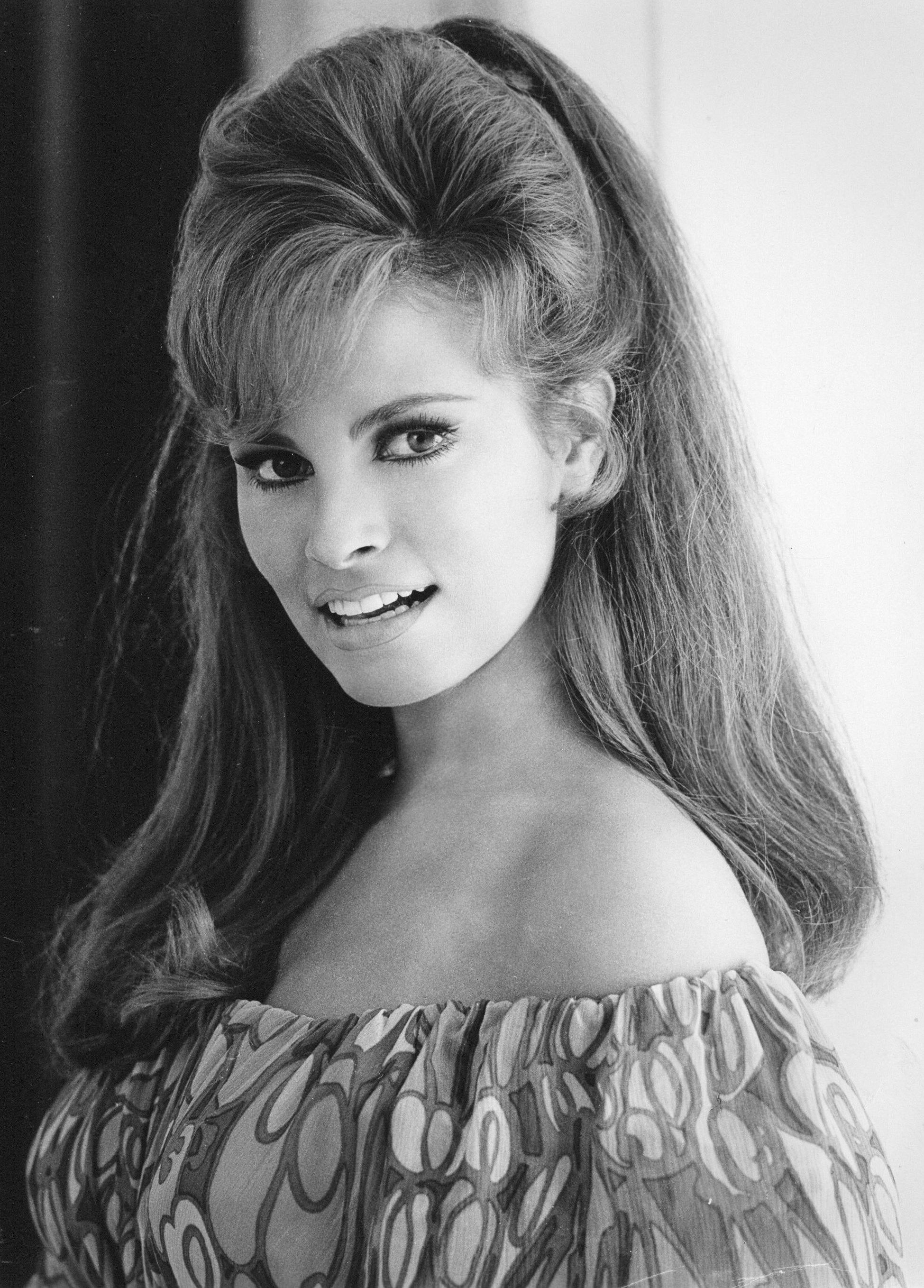
Raquel Welch

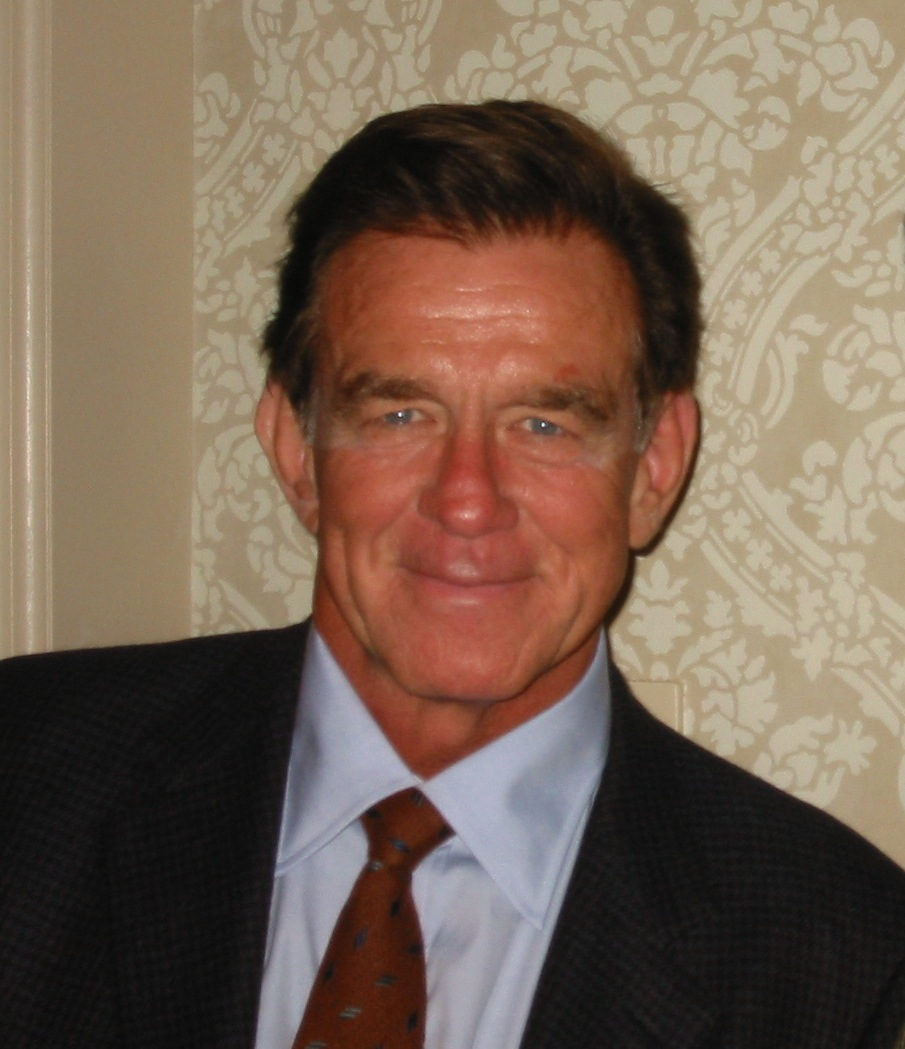
Tim McCarver

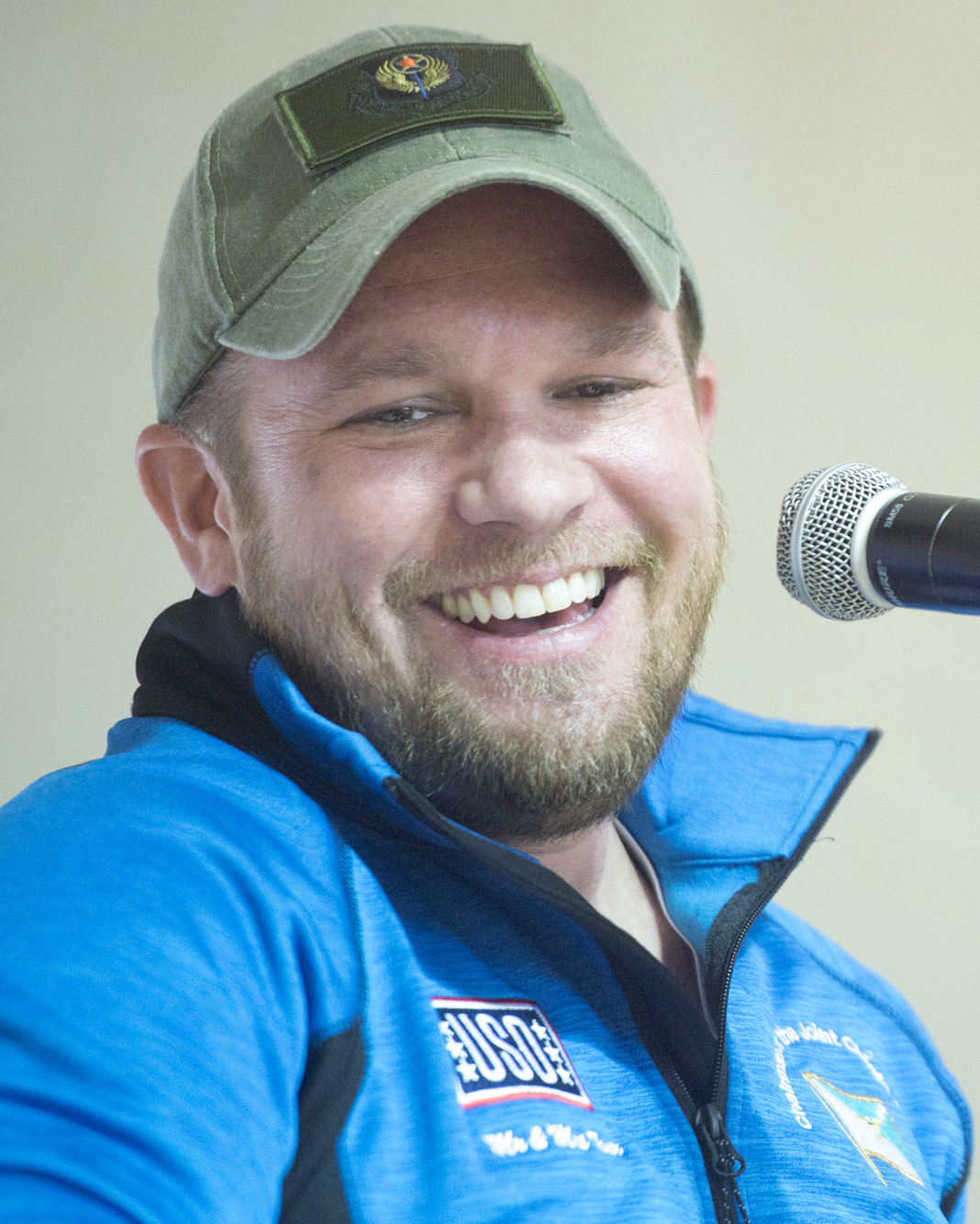
Kyle Jacobs

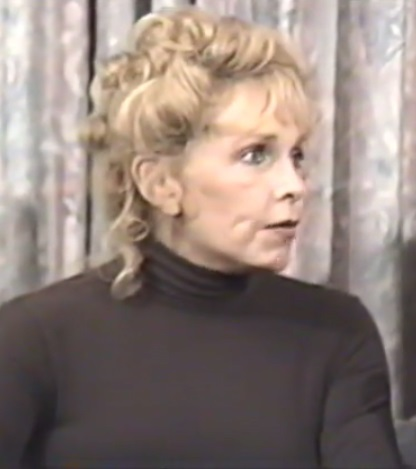
Stella Stevens

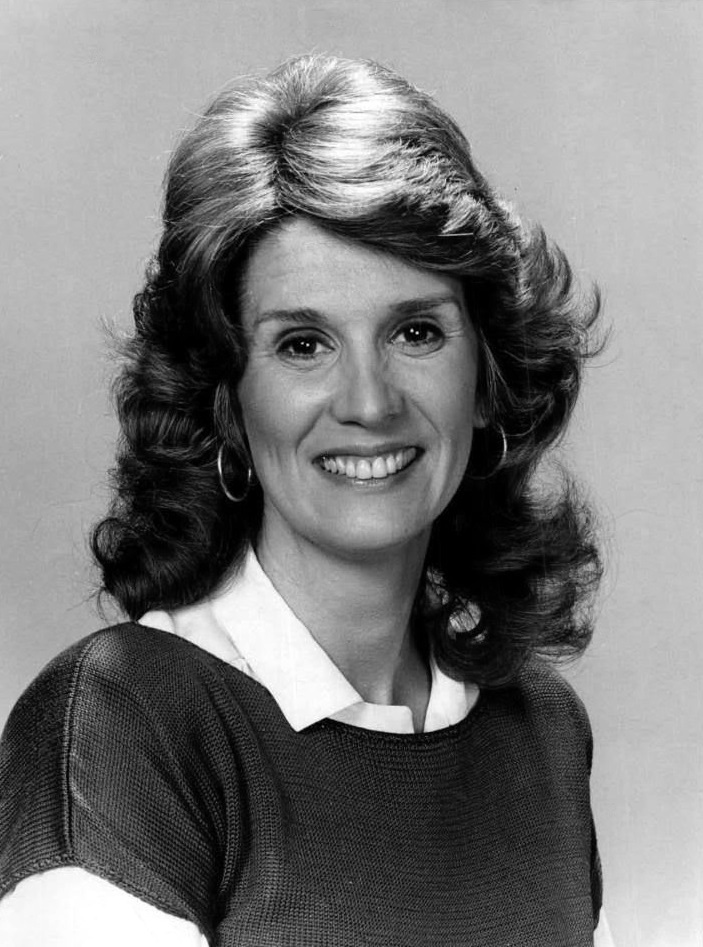
Barbara Bosson

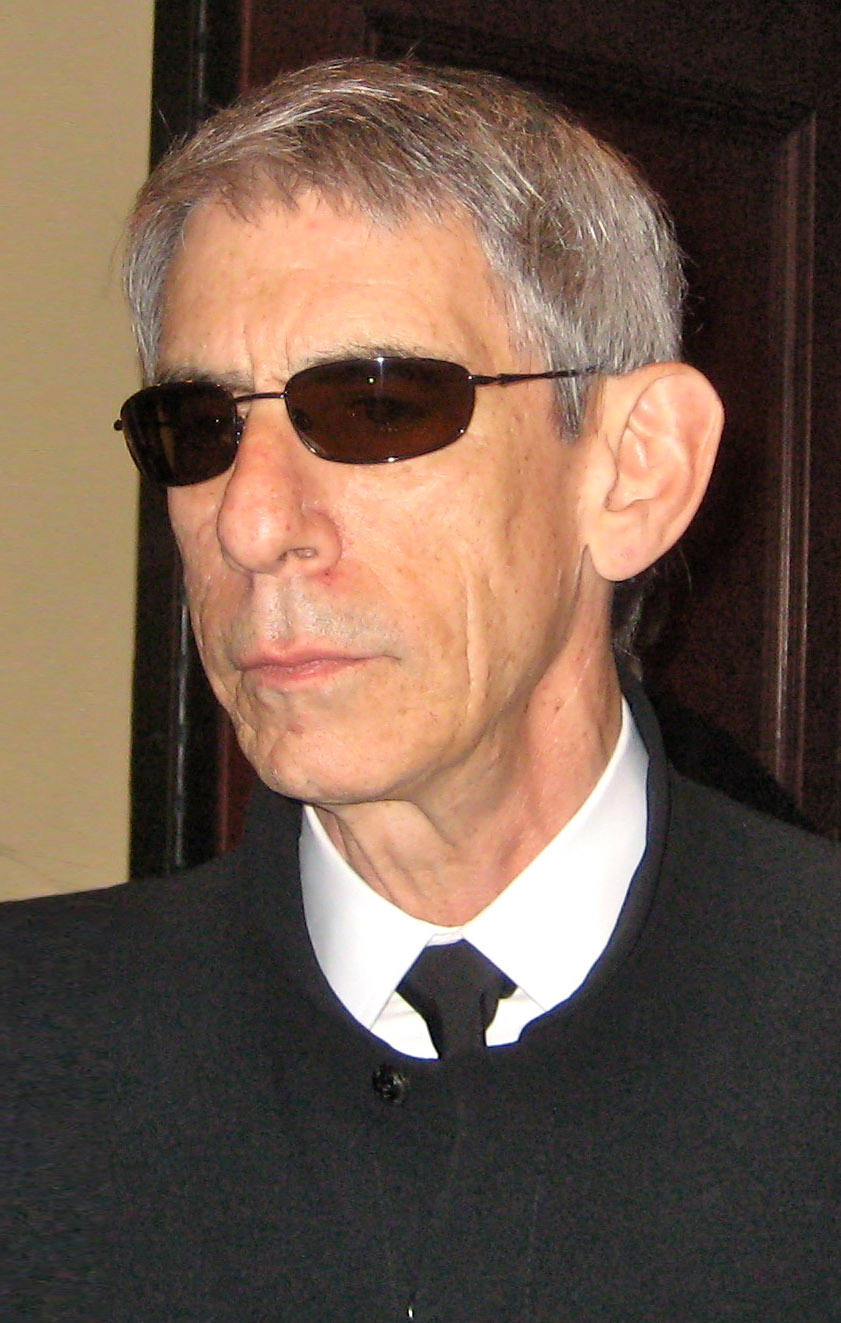
Richard Belzer

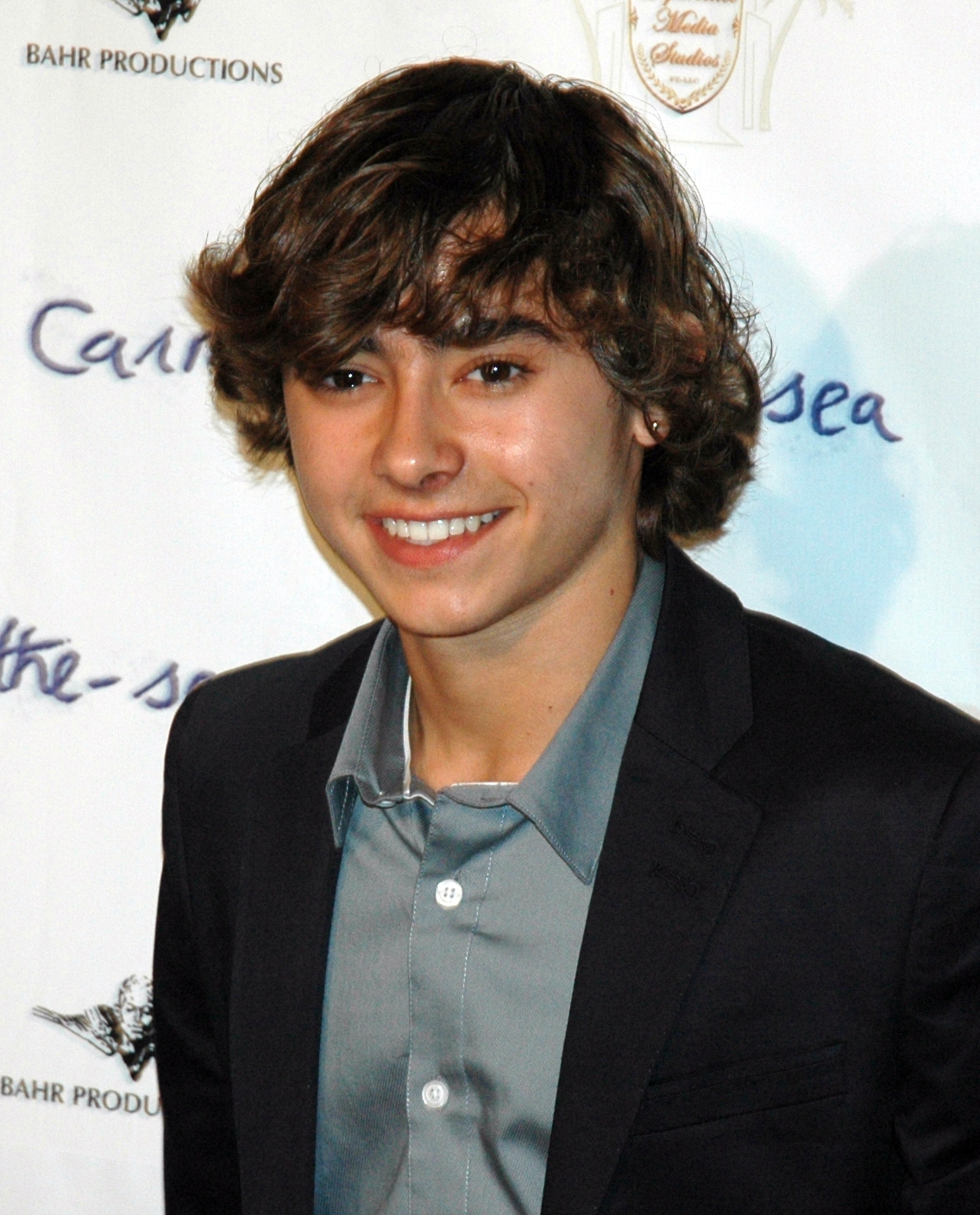
Jansen Panettiere

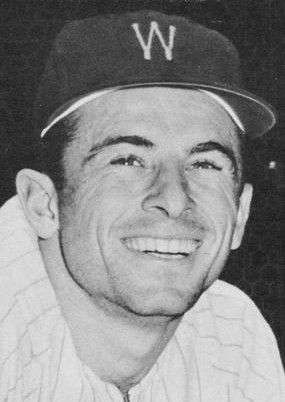
Albie Pearson

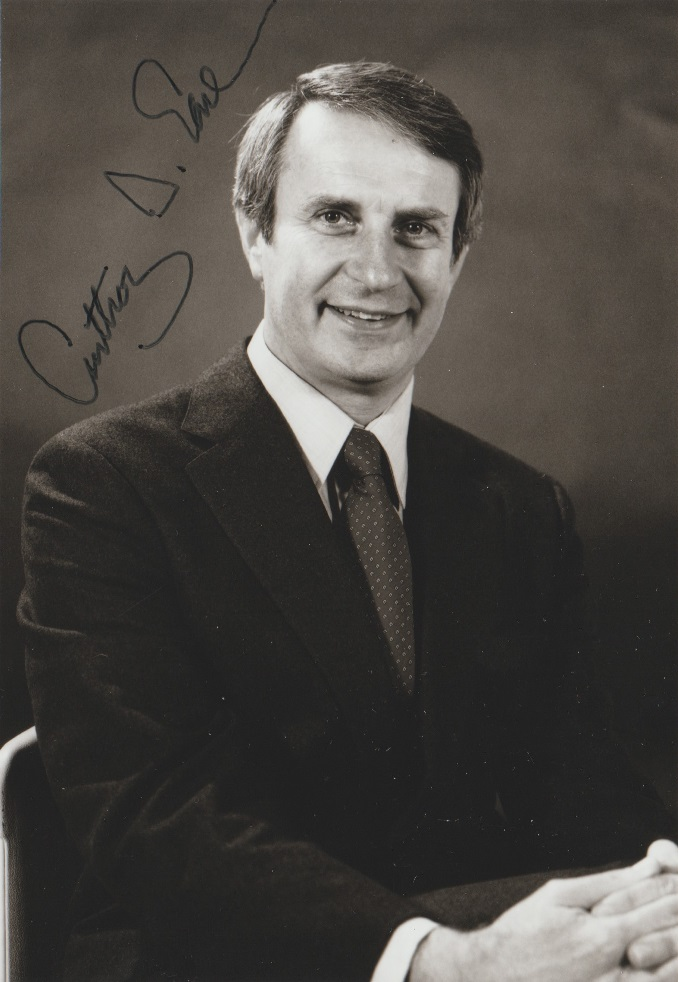
Tony Earl

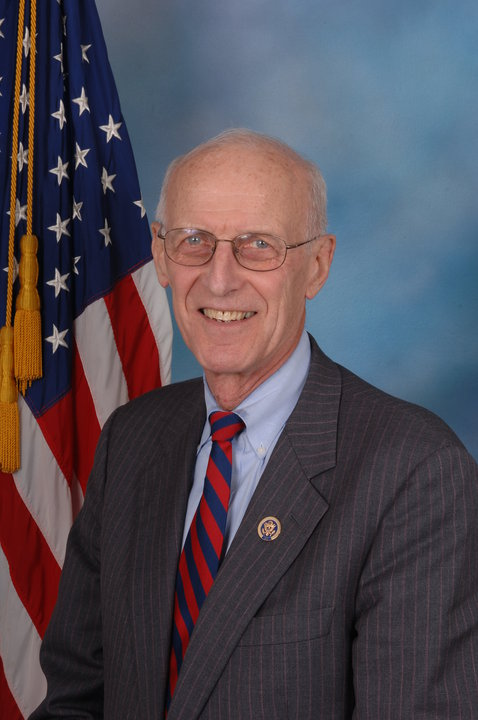
John Olver

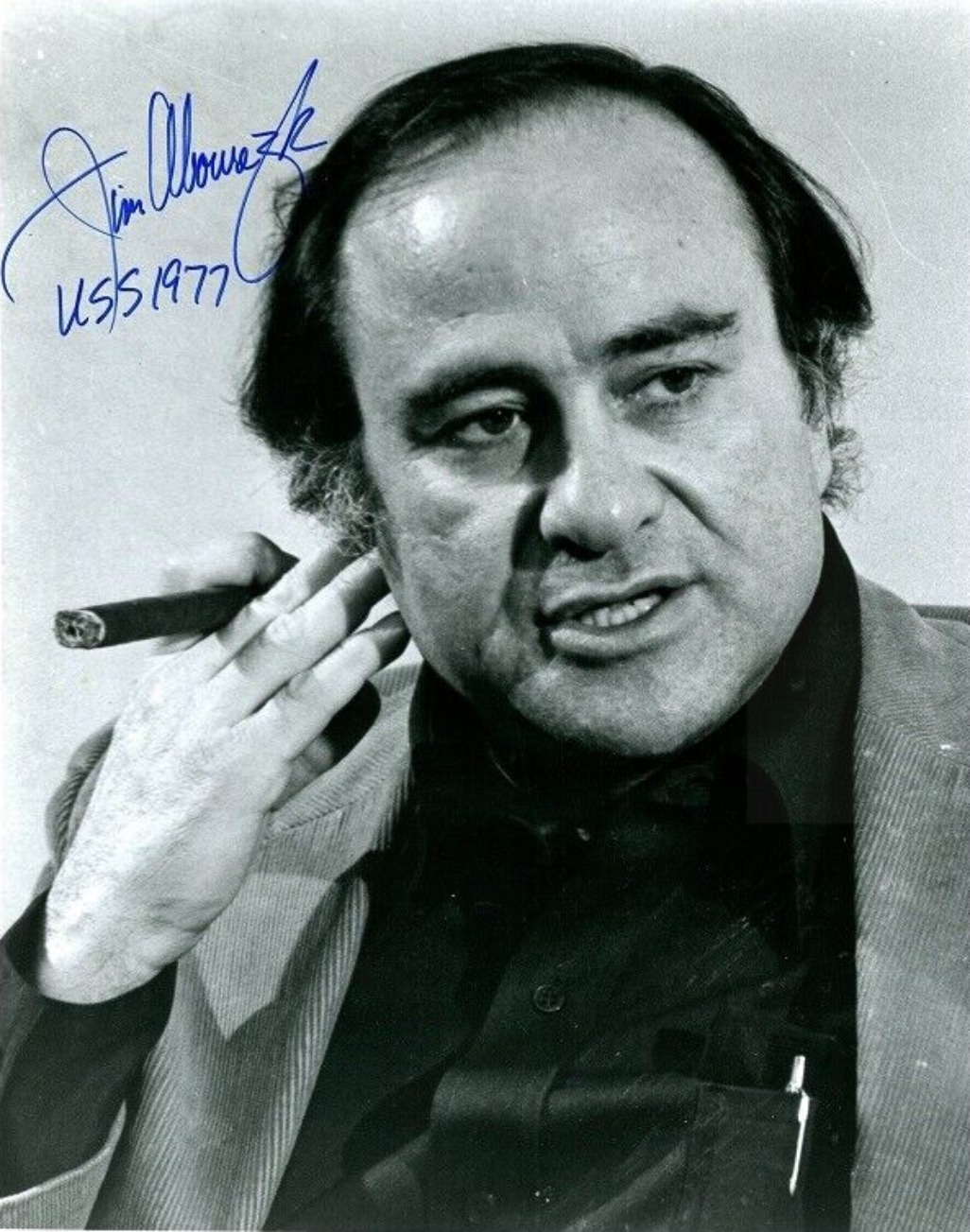
James Abourezk

- February 1
  - Joanne Bracker, 77, Hall of Fame college basketball coach (Midland University) (b. 1945)
  - Don Bramlett, 60, football player (Minnesota Vikings) (b. 1962)
  - Franklin Florence, 88, civil rights activist (b. 1934)
  - Roland Muhlen, 80, Olympic sprint canoer (1972, 1976) (b. 1942)
  - George P. Wilbur, 81, actor (Halloween 4: The Return of Michael Myers, Halloween: The Curse of Michael Myers, Remote Control) and stuntman (b. 1941)
  - Stanley Wilson Jr., 40, football player (Detroit Lions) (b. 1982)
- February 2
  - Ron Campbell, 82, baseball player (Chicago Cubs) (b. 1940)
  - Chris Chesser, 74, film producer (Major League, The Rundown, Bad Day on the Block) (b. 1948)
  - Kenny Jay, 85, professional wrestler (AWA) (b. 1937) (death announced on this date)
  - Butch Miles, 78, jazz drummer (b. 1944)
  - Robert Orben, 95, comedian and speechwriter (b. 1927)
  - Lanny Poffo, 68, professional wrestler (NWA, WWF) (b. 1954)
  - James C. Wofford, 78, equestrian, Olympic silver medalist (1968, 1972) (b. 1944)
- February 3
  - Paul Janovitz, 54, musician (Cold Water Flat) and photographer (b. 1968)
  - Lawrence M. McKenna, 89, jurist, judge of the U.S. District Court for Southern New York (since 1990) (b. 1933)
  - Joan Oates, 94, archaeologist and academic (b. 1928)
  - Irving Stern, 94, politician, member of the Minnesota Senate (1979–1982) (b. 1928)
  - Jack Taylor, 94, broadcaster (b. 1928)
- February 4
  - Susan Duhan Felix, 85, ceramic artist (b. 1937)
  - Adrian Hall, 95, theatre director (b. 1927)
  - Marv Kellum, 70, football player (Pittsburgh Steelers, St. Louis Cardinals) (b. 1952)
  - Floyd Kerr, 76, basketball player (Colorado State Rams) (b. 1946)
  - Pete Koegel, 75, baseball player (Milwaukee Brewers, Philadelphia Phillies) (b. 1947)
  - Paul Martha, 80, football player (Pittsburgh Steelers) and executive (San Francisco 49ers) (b. 1942)
  - Arnold Schulman, 97, screenwriter (Love with the Proper Stranger, Goodbye, Columbus) (b. 1925)
  - Steve Sostak, 49, rock singer (Sweep the Leg Johnny) (b. 1973)
  - Jerry W. Tillman, 82, politician, member of the North Carolina Senate (2003–2020) (b. 1940)
  - Ron Tompkins, 78, baseball player (Kansas City Athletics, Chicago Cubs) (b. 1944)
  - Harry Whittington, 95, attorney and political figure (Dick Cheney hunting accident) (b. 1927)
- February 5
  - Hank Beebe, 96, composer (Bathtubs Over Broadway) (b. 1926)
  - Chris Browne, 70, cartoonist (Hägar the Horrible) (b. 1952)
  - Demetrius Calip, 53, basketball player (Los Angeles Lakers) (b. 1969)
  - Inge Sargent, 90, Austrian-born author and human rights activist, queen consort of Hsipaw State (1953–1962) (b. 1932)
  - Kaye Vaughan, 91, Hall of Fame football player (Ottawa Rough Riders) (b. 1931)
  - Lillian Walker, 78, singer (The Exciters) (b. 1944)
- February 6
  - David Harris, 76, journalist and anti-war activist (b. 1946)
  - Emory Kristof, 80, photographer (b. 1942)
  - Eugene Lee, 83, set designer (Saturday Night Live, Candide, Sweeney Todd: The Demon Barber of Fleet Street) (b. 1939)
  - Charlie Norris, 57, professional wrestler (b. 1965)
- February 7
  - Lee Greenfield, 81, politician, member of the Minnesota House of Representatives (1979–2001) (b. 1941)
  - Tonya Knight, 56, professional bodybuilder and game show contestant (American Gladiators) (b. 1966)
  - Andrew J. McKenna, 93, businessman, chairman of McDonald's (2004–2016) (b. 1929)
- February 8
  - Burt Bacharach, 94, Hall of Fame composer ("Raindrops Keep Fallin' on My Head", "Walk On By", "Arthur's Theme (Best That You Can Do)"), six-time Grammy winner (b. 1928)
  - Shirley Fulton, 71, judge (North Carolina Superior Court) (b. 1952)
  - Cody Longo, 34, actor (Days of Our Lives, Hollywood Heights, Piranha 3D) (b. 1988)
  - Oscar Lawton Wilkerson, 96, pilot (Tuskegee Airmen) and radio personality (b. 1926)
- February 9
  - Doug Mattis, 56, figure skater (b. 1966)
  - Nelson Rising, 81, businessman (Federal Reserve Bank of San Francisco) (b. 1941)
  - Dimitrious Stanley, 48, football player (New Jersey Red Dogs, Winnipeg Blue Bombers) (b. 1974)
- February 10
  - Morris J. Amitay, 86, administrator, executive director of the American Israel Public Affairs Committee (1974–1980) (b. 1936)
  - Len Birman, 90, Canadian-born actor (Silver Streak, Generations, Captain America) (b. 1932)
  - Larry Coyer, 79, football coach (Tampa Bay Buccaneers, Denver Broncos, Indianapolis Colts) (b. 1943)
  - Michael Green, 69, molecular and cell biologist (b. 1954)
- February 11
  - Howard Bragman, 66, public relations executive (b. 1956)
  - Robert Dean Hunter, 94, politician, member of the Texas House of Representatives (1986–2007) (b. 1928)
  - Lee James, 69, weightlifter, Olympic silver medalist (1976)(b. 1953)
  - Austin Majors, 27, actor (NYPD Blue, Treasure Planet, The Ant Bully) (b. 1995)
  - Donald Spoto, 81, biographer (b. 1941)
- February 12
  - Roger Bobo, 84, tuba player (b. 1938)
  - Doug Fisher, 75, football player (Pittsburgh Steelers) (b. 1947)
  - David Jolicoeur, 54, rapper (De La Soul) and songwriter ("Me Myself and I", "Feel Good Inc."), Grammy winner (2006) (b. 1968)
  - Ted Lerner, 97, real estate developer, owner of the Washington Nationals (since 2006) and founder of Lerner Enterprises (b. 1925)
  - Linda King Newell, 82, historian and Mormon scholar (b. 1941)
  - J. Paul Taylor, 102, politician, member of the New Mexico House of Representatives (1987–2005) (b. 1920)
  - W. Russell Todd, 94, United States Army general (b. 1928)
- February 13
  - Tim Aymar, 59, heavy metal singer (Pharaoh) (b. 1963)
  - Marshall "Eddie" Conway, 76, Black Panther Party leader (b. 1946)
  - Roger Bonk, 78, football player (North Dakota Fighting Sioux, Winnipeg Blue Bombers) (b. 1944)
  - Conrad Dobler, 72, football player (St. Louis Cardinals, New Orleans Saints, Buffalo Bills) (b. 1950)
  - Brian DuBois, 55, baseball player (Detroit Tigers) (b. 1967)
  - Robert Geddes, 99, architect, dean of the Princeton University School of Architecture (1965–1982) (b. 1923)
  - Tom Luddy, 79, film producer (Barfly, The Secret Garden), co-founder of the Telluride Film Festival (b. 1943)
  - David Singmaster, 84, mathematician (b. 1938)
  - Huey "Piano" Smith, 89, R&B pianist and songwriter ("Rockin' Pneumonia and the Boogie Woogie Flu") (b. 1934)
  - Jesse Treviño, 76, Mexican-born painter, throat cancer (b. 1946)
  - Spencer Wiggins, 81, soul singer (b. 1942)
- February 14
  - Afternoon Deelites, 31, thoroughbred racehorse (b. 1992)
  - Charley Ferguson, 83, football player (Buffalo Bills, Cleveland Browns, Minnesota Vikings) (b. 1939)
  - Emil C. Gotschlich, 88, chemist, developer of the meningitis vaccine (b. 1935)
  - Allen Green, 84, football player (Dallas Cowboys) (b. 1938)
  - Gary L. Harrell, 71, United States Army general (b. 1951)
  - Jerry Jarrett, 80, professional wrestler (NWA) and wrestling promoter, founder of CWA (b. 1942)
  - Greg McMackin, 77, football coach (Oregon Tech Hustlin' Owls, Hawaii Warriors) (b. 1945)
  - Neale Stoner, 86, sports coach and athletic director (b. 1936)
  - John M. Veitch, 77, Hall of Fame racehorse trainer (b. 1945)
- February 15
  - Paul Berg, 96, biochemist, Nobel Prize laureate (1980) (b. 1926)
  - Catherine McArdle Kelleher, 84, political scientist (b. 1939)
  - David Oreck, 99, entrepreneur (b. 1923)
  - Raquel Welch, 82, actress (One Million Years B.C., The Three Musketeers, Fantastic Voyage) (b. 1940)
  - John E. Woods, 80, translator (b. 1942)
- February 16
  - Simone Edwards, 49, basketball player (New York Liberty, Seattle Storm) (b. 1973)
  - Chuck Jackson, 85, R&B singer ("Any Day Now", "I Keep Forgettin'", "Tell Him I'm Not Home") (b. 1937)
  - Tim McCarver, 81, baseball player (St. Louis Cardinals, Philadelphia Phillies) and broadcaster (Fox Sports) (b. 1941)
  - Hank Skinner, 60, killer (b. 1962)
- February 17
  - Otis Barthoulameu, 70, musician (Fluf, Olivelawn) and record producer (Cheshire Cat) (b. 1952) (death announced on this date)
  - Rebecca Blank, 67, economist and academic administrator, acting secretary of commerce (2011, 2012–2013) and chancellor of the University of Wisconsin-Madison (2013–2022) (b. 1955)
  - Jerry Dodgion, 90, jazz saxophonist and flautist (b. 1932)
  - Gerald Fried, 95, composer (Gilligan's Island, Star Trek: The Original Series, Roots) (b. 1928)
  - Kyle Jacobs, 49, songwriter ("More Than a Memory") (b. 1973)
  - James A. Joseph, 88, diplomat, ambassador to South Africa (1996–1999) (b. 1935)
  - Stella Stevens, 84, actress (Girls! Girls! Girls!, The Nutty Professor, The Poseidon Adventure) (b. 1938)
  - Tom Whitlock, 68, songwriter ("Danger Zone", "Take My Breath Away", "Winner Takes It All"), Oscar winner (1987) (b. 1954)
- February 18
  - Barbara Bosson, 83, actress (Hill Street Blues) (b. 1939)
  - Jim Broyhill, 95, politician, member of the U.S. House of Representatives (1963–1986) and Senate (1986) (b. 1927)
  - Thomas R. Donahue, 94, labor leader, president of the AFL–CIO (1995), complications from a fall (b. 1928)
  - Ammon McNeely, 52, rock climber (b. 1970)
  - David G. O'Connell, 69, Irish-born Roman Catholic prelate, auxiliary bishop of Los Angeles (since 2015) (b. 1953)
  - Justin O. Schmidt, 75, entomologist (b. 1947)
  - Richard H. Tilly, 90, economic historian (b. 1932)
- February 19
  - Richard Belzer, 78, actor (Homicide: Life on the Street, Law & Order: Special Victims Unit, The Flash), stand-up comedian, and author (b. 1944)
  - Davis Causey, 74, guitarist (Sea Level) (b. 1948)
  - Greg Foster, 64, hurdler, Olympic silver medallist (1984) (b. 1958)
  - David Lance Goines, 77, artist (b. 1945)
  - Red McCombs, 95, businessman and sports team owner (San Antonio Spurs, Minnesota Vikings), co-founder of iHeartMedia (b. 1927)
  - Jim McMillin, 85, football player (Denver Broncos, Oakland Raiders) (b. 1937)
  - Jansen Panettiere, 28, actor (The Secrets of Jonathan Sperry, The Perfect Game, Robots) (b. 1994)
- February 20
  - Bruce Barthol, 75, bassist (Country Joe and the Fish) (b. 1947)
  - Michael S. Heiser, 60, biblical scholar and author (b. 1963)
  - John Hitt, 82, academic administrator, president of the University of Central Florida (1992–2018) (b. 1940)
- February 21
  - Ron Altbach, 76, keyboardist (King Harvest, Celebration) and songwriter ("Alone on Christmas Day") (b. 1946)
  - Zandra Flemister, 71, diplomat (b. 1951)
  - Jesse Gress, 67, rock guitarist (b. 1956)
  - Albie Pearson, 88, baseball player (Los Angeles/California Angels, Washington Senators, Baltimore Orioles) (b. 1934)
  - Rayford Price, 86, politician, member (1961–1973) and speaker (1972–1973) of the Texas House of Representatives (b. 1937)
- February 22
  - Howard R. Lamar, 99, historian, president of Yale University (1992–1993) (b. 1923)
  - Dylan Lyons, 24, television journalist (Spectrum News 13) (b. 1998)
  - Augie Nieto, 65, businessman, founder of Life Fitness (b. 1958)
- February 23
  - Donald Dillbeck, 59, convicted murderer (b. 1963)
  - Tony Earl, 86, politician, governor of Wisconsin (1983–1987) and member of the Wisconsin State Assembly (1969–1975) (b. 1936)
  - Thomas H. Lee, 78, financier, founder of Thomas H. Lee Partners and Lee Equity Partners (b. 1944)
  - John Olver, 86, politician, member of the U.S. House of Representatives (1991–2013), member of the Massachusetts Senate (1973–1991) and House of Representatives (1969–1973) (b. 1936)
  - Allen Steck, 96, mountaineer and rock climber (b. 1926)
- February 24
  - James Abourezk, 92, politician, member of the U.S. House of Representatives (1971–1973) and Senate (1973–1979) (b. 1931)
  - Michael Blackwood, 88, documentary filmmaker (b. 1934)
  - Ed Fury, 94, bodybuilder and actor (Ursus, The Seven Revenges Ursus in the Land of Fire) (b. 1928)
  - Walter Mirisch, 101, film producer (In the Heat of the Night, Midway, The Hawaiians), Oscar winner (1967) (b. 1921)
  - David L. Starling, 73, railroad executive (b. 1949)
- February 25
  - Jack Billion, 83, politician, member of the South Dakota House of Representatives (1993–1997) (b. 1939)
  - Kris Jordan, 46, politician, member of the Ohio House of Representatives (2009–2010, since 2019) and Senate (2011–2018) (b. 1977)
  - Fred Miller, 82, football player (Baltimore Colts) (b. 1940)
  - Dave Nicholson, 83, baseball player (Baltimore Orioles, Chicago White Sox, Houston Astros) (b. 1939)
  - Carl Saunders, 80, trumpeter, composer and educator (b. 1942)
  - Richard Trefry, 98, army lieutenant general (b. 1924)
- February 26
  - Terry Holland, 80, basketball coach (Virginia Cavaliers) (b. 1942)
  - Gus Franklin Mutscher, 90, politician, speaker of the Texas House of Representatives (1969–1972) (b. 1932)
  - Bob Richards, 97, pole vaulter and politician, Olympic champion (1952, 1956) (b. 1926)
  - Fred Shabel, 90, basketball coach (UConn Huskies) (b. 1932)
- February 27
  - Ricou Browning, 93, actor (Creature from the Black Lagoon, Revenge of the Creature) and television director (Flipper) (b. 1930)
  - Burny Mattinson, 87, animator (The Jungle Book, The Great Mouse Detective, Robin Hood) (b. 1935)
  - Jerry Simmons, 76, tennis coach (LSU Tigers) (b. 1946)
- February 28
  - Michael Botticelli, 63, Olympic figure skater (1980) (b. 1959)
  - Brian J. Donnelly, 76, politician and diplomat, member of the U.S. House of Representatives (1979–1993) and ambassador to Trinidad and Tobago (1994–1997) (b. 1946)
  - Jean Faut, 97, baseball player (South Bend Blue Sox) (b. 1925)
  - Bo Hickey, 77, football player (Montreal Alouettes, Brooklyn Dodgers, Denver Broncos) (b. 1945)
  - Jay Weston, 93, film producer (Lady Sings the Blues, Buddy Buddy) (b. 1929)

== March ==
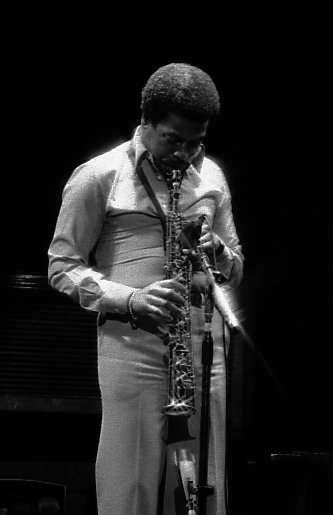
Wayne Shorter

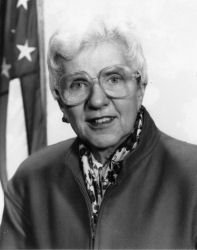
Barbara Everitt Bryant

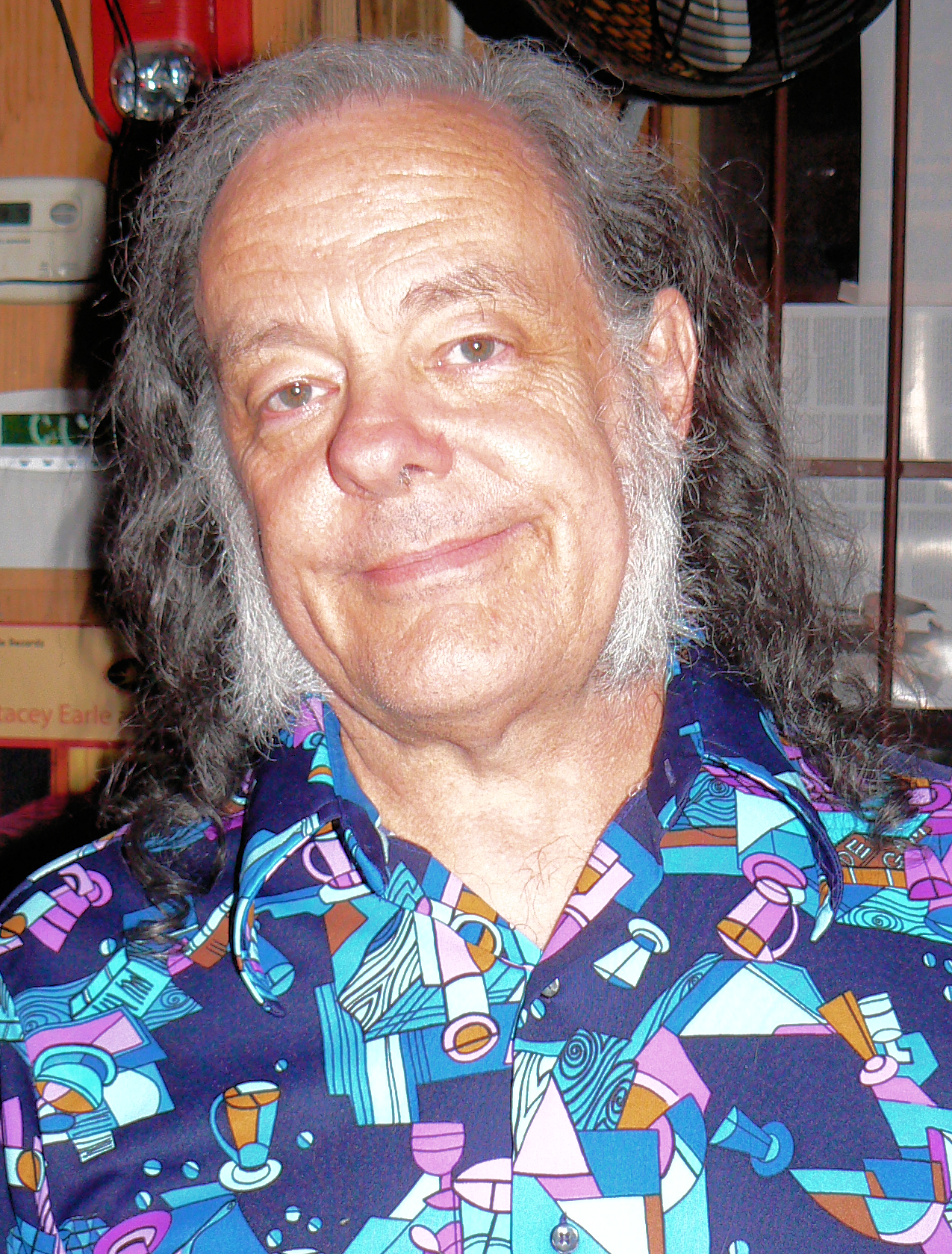
David Lindley

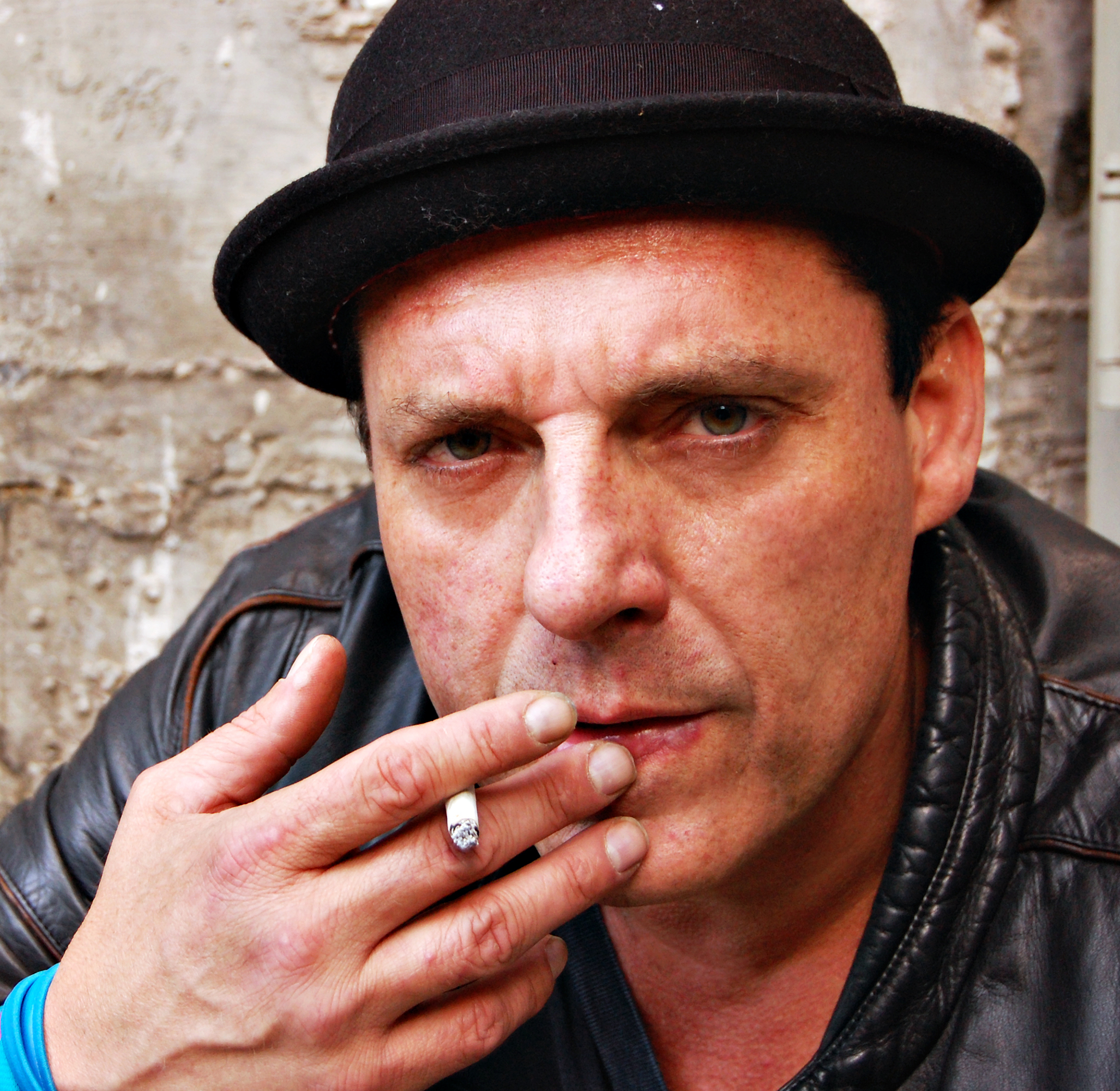
Tom Sizemore

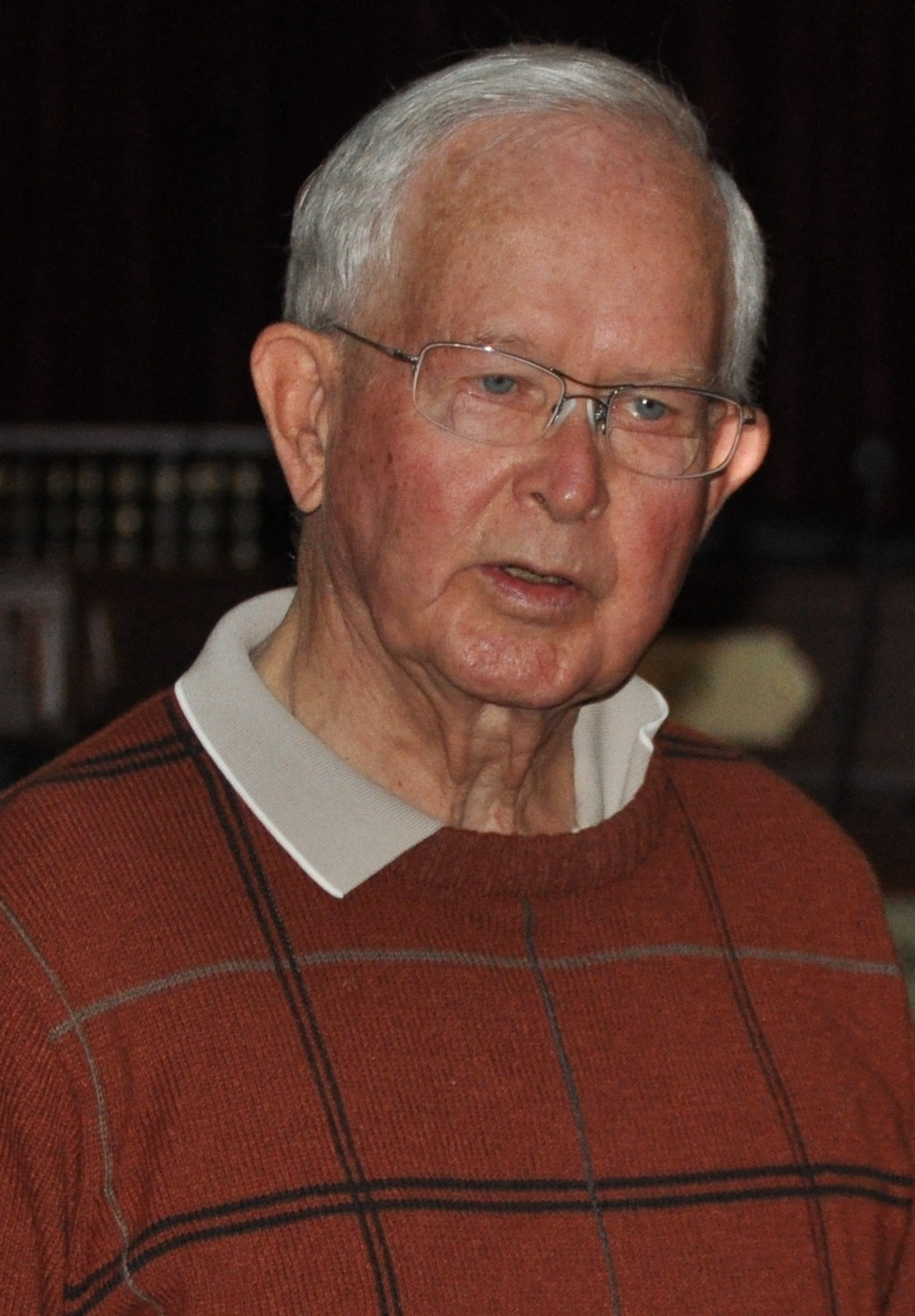
Phil Batt

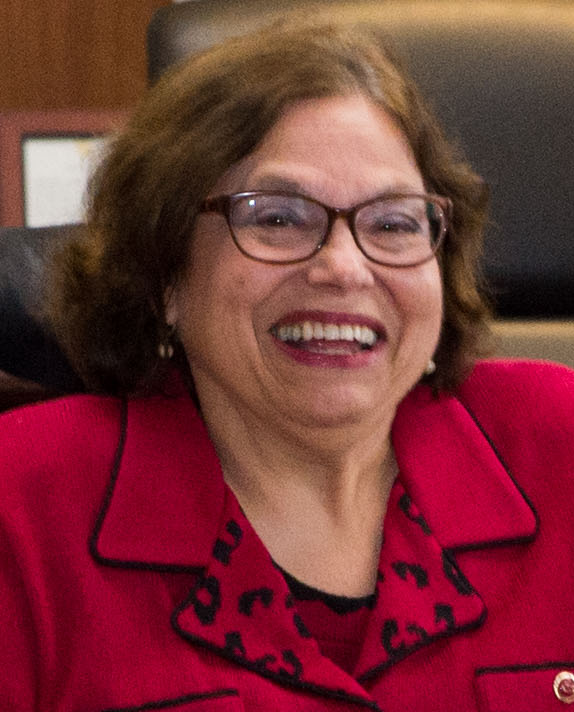
Judith Heumann

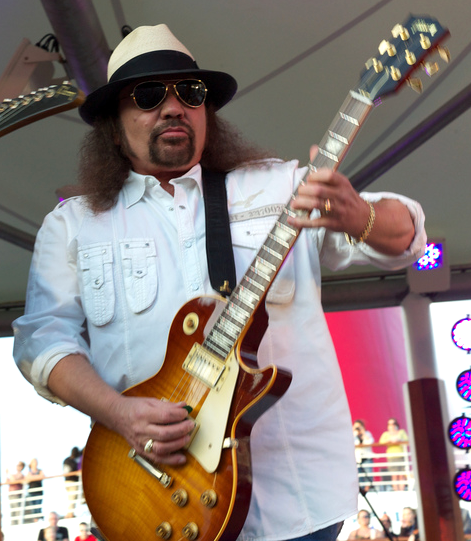
Gary Rossington

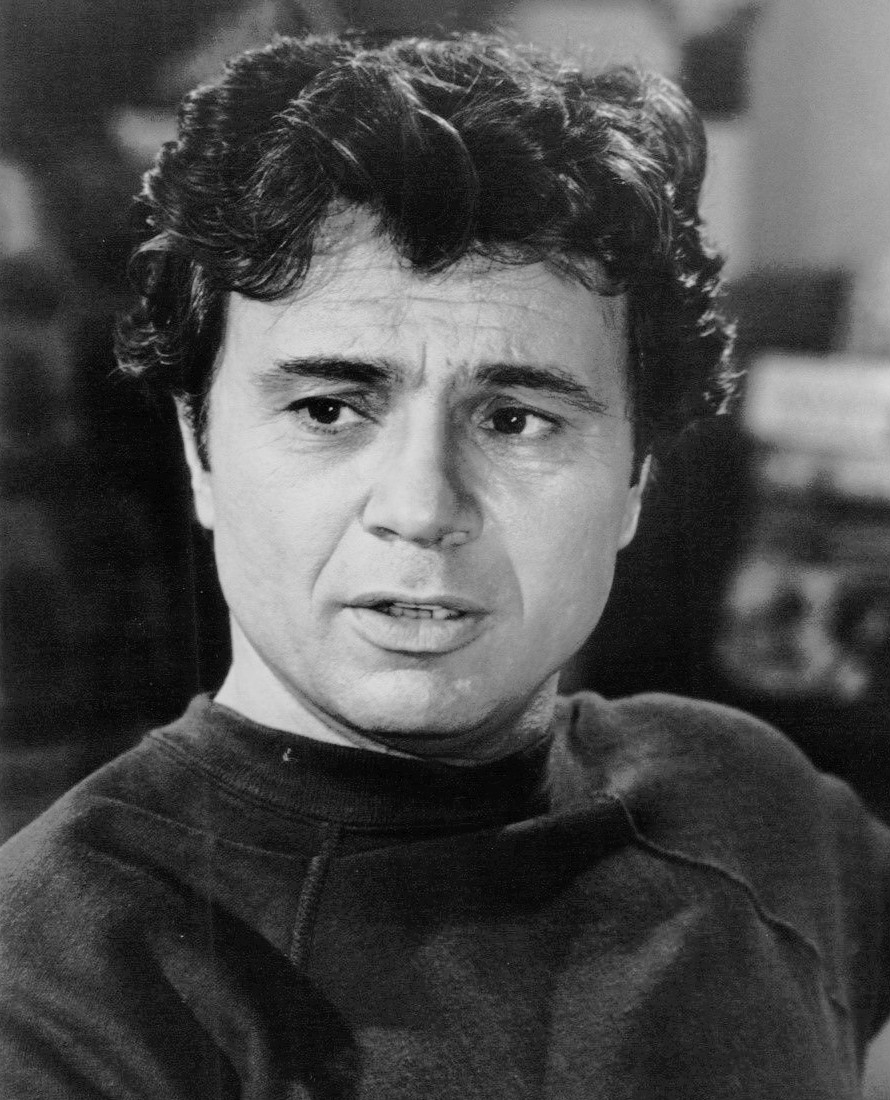
Robert Blake

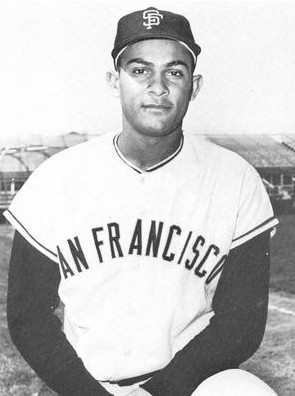
Jesús Alou

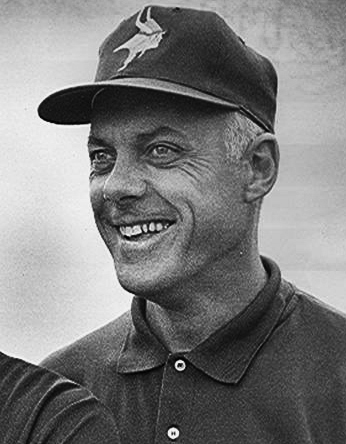
Bud Grant

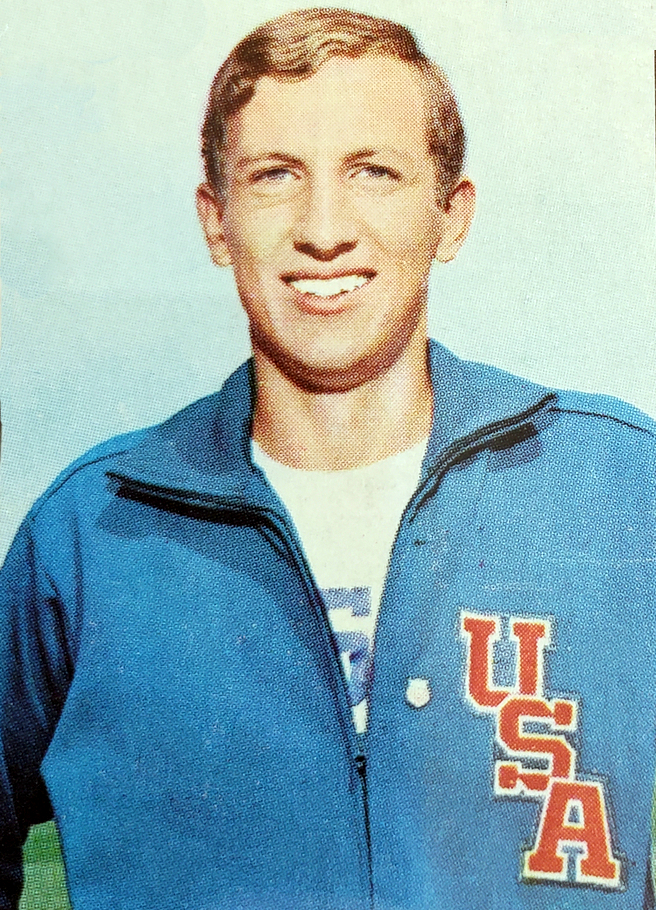
Dick Fosbury

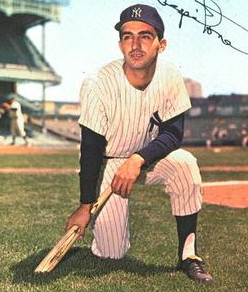
Joe Pepitone

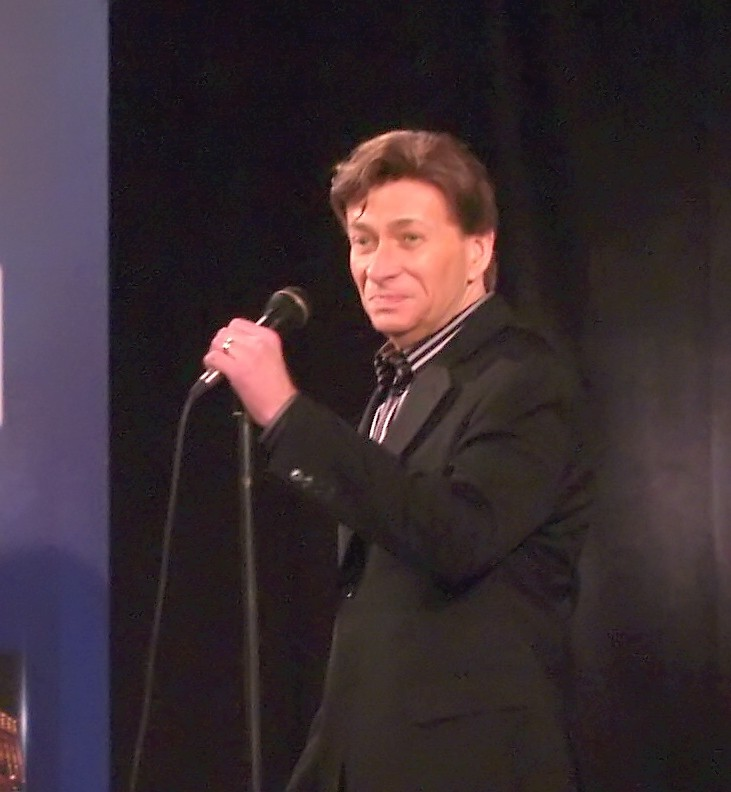
Bobby Caldwell

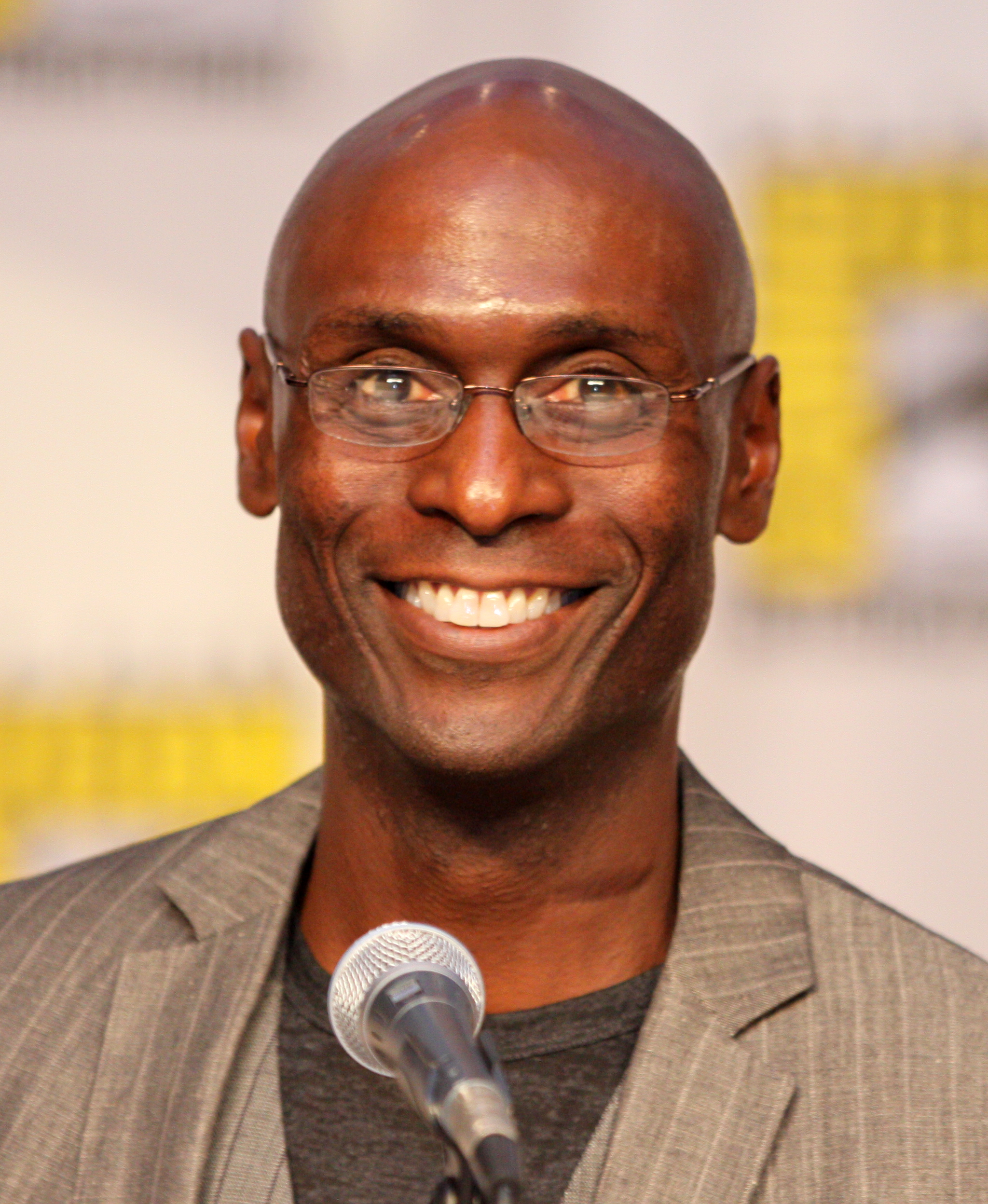
Lance Reddick

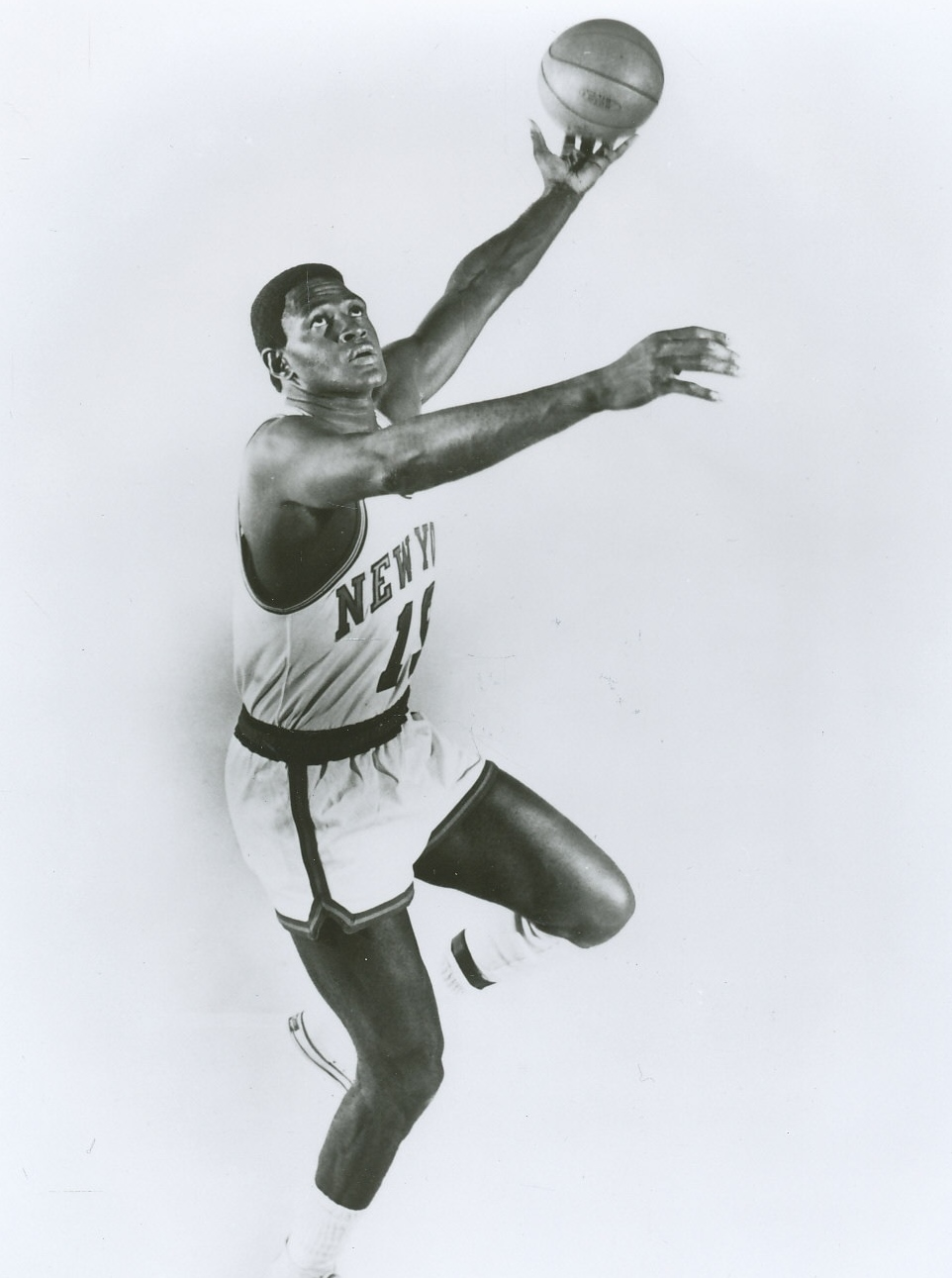
Willis Reed

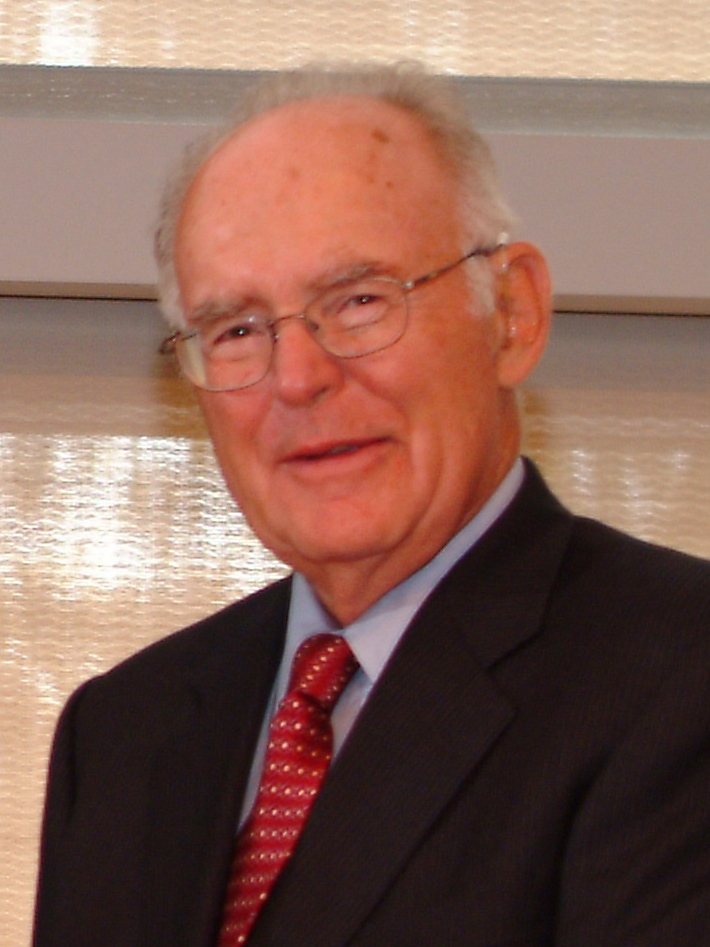
Gordon Moore

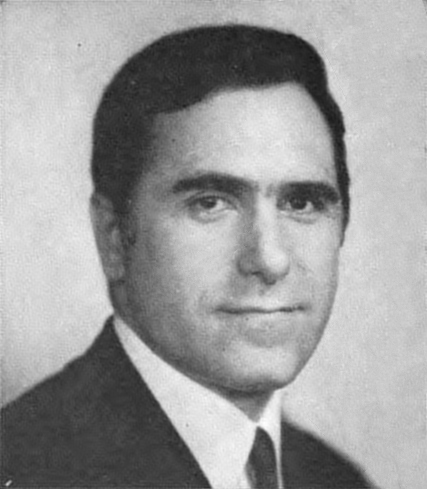
Nick Galifianakis

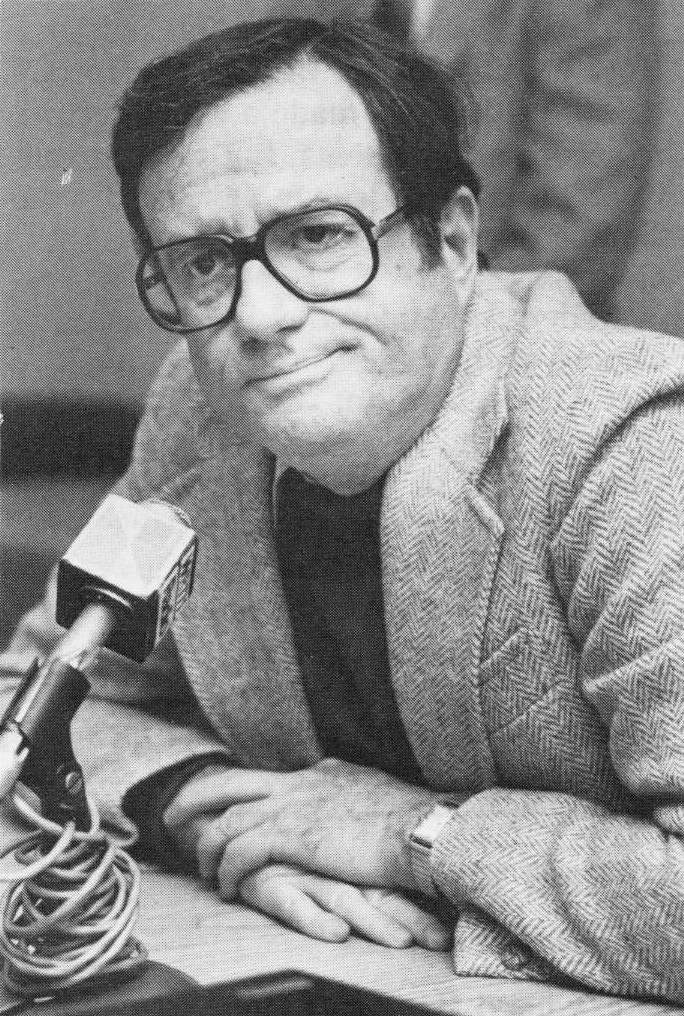
Mark Russell

- March 1
  - William E. Cooper, 93, major general (b. 1929)
  - Ted Donaldson, 89, actor (A Tree Grows in Brooklyn, Adventures of Rusty, Father Knows Best) (b. 1933)
  - Charles Harrington Elster, 65, writer and broadcaster (A Way with Words) (b. 1957)
  - Leon Hughes, 92, musician (The Coasters) (b. 1930)
  - Dan McGinn, 79, baseball player (Montreal Expos, Chicago Cubs, Cincinnati Reds) (b. 1943)
  - Jerry Richardson, 86, football player (Baltimore Colts) and executive (Carolina Panthers) (b. 1936)
- March 2
  - Lokenath Debnath, 87, Indian-born mathematician, founder of the International Journal of Mathematics and Mathematical Sciences (b. 1935)
  - Phil Hopkins, 73, basketball coach (Western Carolina Catamounts) (b. 1949)
  - Theodore Kanamine, 93, brigadier general (b. 1929)
  - Dell Raybould, 89, politician, member of the Idaho House of Representatives (2000–2018) (b. 1933)
  - C. Paul Robinson, 81, physicist (b. 1941)
  - Wayne Shorter, 89, jazz saxophonist (Miles Davis Quintet, Weather Report, The Jazz Messengers), 12-time Grammy winner (b. 1933)
- March 3
  - Barbara Everitt Bryant, 96, market researcher, director of the United States Census Bureau (1989–1993) (b. 1926)
  - Carlos Garnett, 84, Panamanian-born jazz saxophonist (b. 1938)
  - Sara Lane, 73, actress (The Virginian, I Saw What You Did) (b. 1949)
  - David Lindley, 78, musician (Kaleidoscope) and singer ("Mercury Blues") (b. 1944)
  - Calvin Newton, 93, gospel singer (The Oak Ridge Boys, Sons of Song) (b. 1929)
  - Tom Sizemore, 61, actor (Natural Born Killers, Heat, Saving Private Ryan, Black Hawk Down) (b. 1961)
  - Lou Stovall, 86, painter (b. 1937)
- March 4
  - Phil Batt, 96, politician, governor of Idaho (1995–1999), member of the Idaho House of Representatives (1965–1967) and twice of the Senate (b. 1927)
  - Robert Haimer, 69, musician (Barnes & Barnes) and songwriter ("Fish Heads") (b. 1954)
  - Judith Heumann, 75, disability rights activist (b. 1947)
  - Michael Rhodes, 69, bass player (b. 1953)
  - Andre Smith, 64, basketball player (Nebraska Cornhuskers) (b. 1958)
  - Donald Snyder, 71, politician, member of the Pennsylvania House of Representatives (1981–2000) (b. 1951)
  - Spot, 72, record producer (Damaged, Milo Goes to College, Zen Arcade) (b. 1951)
- March 5
  - Francisco J. Ayala, 88, Spanish-born evolutionary biologist and philosopher (b. 1934)
  - Joanne Elliott, 97, mathematician (b. 1925)
  - Bob Goodman, 83, Hall of Fame boxing promoter (b. 1939)
  - Frank Griswold, 85, clergyman, presiding bishop of the Episcopal Church (1998–2006) (b. 1937)
  - Tom Hsieh, 91, politician, member of the San Francisco Board of Supervisors (1986–1997) (b. 1931)
  - Ilkka Järvi-Laturi, 61, Finnish-born film director (Spy Games) (b. 1961)
  - Gary Rossington, 71, Hall of Fame guitarist (Lynyrd Skynyrd, Rossington Collins Band) (b. 1951)
  - Helen Vanni, 99, opera singer (b. 1924)
  - Dave Wills, 58, sportscaster (Tampa Bay Rays) (b. 1964)
- March 6
  - Harvey Carignan, 95 serial killer (b. 1927)
  - Sergey Grishin, 56, Russian-born businessman and engineer (b. 1966)
  - Traute Lafrenz, 103, German-born resistance fighter (White Rose) (b. 1919)
  - Eric Alan Livingston, 38, musician (Mamaleek) (b. 1984)
  - Wally Smith, 96, British-born mathematician (b. 1926)
- March 7
  - Ian Falconer, 63, author (Olivia) and illustrator (The New Yorker) (b. 1959)
  - Lisa Janti, 89, actress (World Without End, Ten Thousand Bedrooms) (b. 1933)
  - Tom Love, 85, entrepreneur, founder of Love's (b. 1937)
  - Pat McCormick, 92, diver, four-time Olympic champion (1952, 1956) (b. 1930)
  - Herbert Richardson, 72, politician, member of the New Hampshire House of Representatives (2002–2006, 2008–2018) (b. 1951)
  - Peterson Zah, 85, politician, president of the Navajo Nation (1991–1995) (b. 1937)
- March 8
  - Jim Durkin, 58, thrash metal guitarist (Dark Angel) (b. 1964)
  - Bert I. Gordon, 100, film director and screenwriter (Village of the Giants, Empire of the Ants, The Amazing Colossal Man) (b. 1922)
  - Dolores Klaich, 86, author and activist (b. 1936)
  - Jim Moeller, 67, politician, member of the Washington House of Representatives (2003–2017) (b. 1955)
  - Tish Naghise, 59, politician, member of the Georgia House of Representatives (since 2023) (b. 1963)
  - Abraham Zarem, 106, scientist (Manhattan Project) (b. 1917)
- March 9
  - Robert Blake, 89, actor (Baretta, In Cold Blood, Electra Glide in Blue, Lost Highway) (b. 1933)
  - William R. Cotter, 87, lawyer, president of Colby College (1979–2000) (b. 1936)
  - Mark Crutcher, 74, anti-abortion activist and author, founder of Life Dynamics Inc. (b. 1948)
  - Chris Greeley, 60, politician (b. 1962)
  - Connie Martinson, 90, writer and television personality (b. 1932)
  - Otis Taylor, 80, football player (Kansas City Chiefs), Super Bowl champion (1970) (b. 1942)
- March 10
  - Jesús Alou, 80, Dominican baseball player (San Francisco Giants, Houston Astros, Oakland Athletics) (b. 1942)
  - Skip Bafalis, 93, politician, member of the U.S. House of Representatives (1973–1983), member of the Florida Senate (1966–1970) and House of Representatives (1964–1966) (b. 1929)
  - Kevin Freeman, 81, equestrian, Olympic silver medalist (1964, 1968, 1972) (b. 1941)
  - Dick Haley, 85, football player (Washington Redskins, Minnesota Vikings, Pittsburgh Steelers) (b. 1937)
  - Rolland Hein, 90, college professor and scholar (b. 1932)
  - Napoleon XIV, 84, singer ("They're Coming to Take Me Away, Ha-Haaa!") (b. 1938)
  - Demetrio Perez Jr, 77, Cuban-born educator and politician (b. 1945)
  - Anthony Verga, 87, politician, member of the Massachusetts House of Representatives (1995–2009) (b. 1935)
  - William Wulf, 83, computer scientist (b. 1939)
- March 11
  - Wendy Barker, 80, poet (b. 1942)
  - Amy Fuller, 54, rower, Olympic silver medalist (1992) (b. 1968)
  - Bud Grant, 95, basketball player (Minneapolis Lakers), Hall of Fame football player (Winnipeg Blue Bombers) and coach (Minnesota Vikings) (b. 1927)
  - John Jakes, 90, author (North and South, The Kent Family Chronicles) (b. 1932)
  - David Reed, 96, Anglican clergyman, bishop of Colombia (1964–1972) and Kentucky (1974–1994) (b. 1927)
- March 12
  - Warren Boroson, 88, journalist, educator, and author (b. 1935)
  - Chris Cooper, 44, American-Italian baseball player (San Marino Baseball Club, Italy national team) (b. 1978)
  - Rolly Crump, 93, animator (Lady and the Tramp, Sleeping Beauty, One Hundred and One Dalmatians) and designer (b. 1930)
  - Dix Denney, 65, guitarist (The Weirdos, Thelonious Monster) (b. 1957)
  - Dick Fosbury, 76, high jumper (Fosbury Flop), Olympic champion (1968) (b. 1947)
  - Felton Spencer, 55, basketball player (Minnesota Timberwolves, Utah Jazz, Golden State Warriors) (b. 1968)
- March 13
  - Bob Breitenstein, 79, football player (Denver Broncos, Atlanta Falcons, Minnesota Vikings) (b. 1943)
  - Nicholas Calabrese, 80, contract killer (b. 1942)
  - Jim Gordon, 77, musician (Derek and the Dominos), songwriter ("Layla") and convicted murderer (b. 1945)
  - Edward Leavy, 93, jurist, judge on the U.S. District Court for Oregon (1984–1987) and U.S. Court of Appeals for the Ninth Circuit (since 1987) (b. 1929)
  - Joe Pepitone, 82, baseball player (New York Yankees, Houston Astros, Chicago Cubs), World Series champion (1962) (b. 1940)
  - Pat Schroeder, 82, politician, member of the U.S. House of Representatives (1973–1997) (b. 1940)
  - Eric Lloyd Wright, 93, architect (b. 1929)
- March 14
  - Bobby Caldwell, 71, singer ("What You Won't Do for Love") and songwriter ("The Next Time I Fall") (b. 1951)
  - Jim Ferree, 91, golfer (b. 1931)
  - Antonina Uccello, 100, politician, mayor of Hartford (1967–1971) (b. 1922)
- March 15
  - Jeff Gaylord, 64, professional wrestler (UWF, WCCW) and football player (Toronto Argonauts) (b. 1958)
  - Stuart Hodes, 98, dancer (b. 1924)
  - Mary Ann Nevins Radzinowicz, 97, academic and scholar (b. 1925)
  - Ronald Rice, 77, politician, member of the New Jersey Senate (1986–2022) (b. 1945)
  - Norman Steinberg, 83, screenwriter (Blazing Saddles, My Favorite Year, Johnny Dangerously) (b. 1939)
- March 16
  - Gladys Kessler, 85, jurist, judge of the Superior Court of the District of Columbia (1977–1994) and the U.S. District Court for the District of Columbia (since 1994) (b. 1938)
- March 17
  - John Carenza, 73, Olympic soccer player (1972) (b. 1950)
  - Hal Dresner, 85, screenwriter (The Eiger Sanction, Zorro, The Gay Blade, Sssssss) (b. 1937)
  - Fuzzy Haskins, 81, Hall of Fame singer (Parliament-Funkadelic) (b. 1941)
  - John Jenrette, 86, politician, member of the U.S. House of Representatives (1975–1980), member of the South Carolina House of Representatives (1964–1972) (b. 1936)
  - Lance Reddick, 60, actor (The Wire, Fringe, John Wick) (b. 1962)
  - Robert W. Sennewald, 93, army general (b. 1929)
  - Ray Solari, 95, football player (California Golden Bears) and coach (b. 1928)
  - Guy Troy, 100, Olympic pentathlete (1952) and United States Army officer (b. 1923)
- March 18
  - Gloria Dea, 100, actress (King of the Congo, Plan 9 from Outer Space) and magician (b. 1922)
  - Harold Parks Helms, 87, politician, member of the North Carolina House of Representatives (1974–1984) (b. 1935)
  - Charity Scott, 72, legal scholar (b. 1951)
  - Steven Ungerleider, 73, sports psychologist, author and documentary film producer (Munich '72 and Beyond, End Game, Citizen Ashe) (b. 1949)
  - Dot Wilkinson, 101, Hall of Fame bowler and softball player (b. 1921)
- March 19
  - Willie Cager, 80, basketball player (Texas Western Miners) (b. 1942)
  - Elizabeth de Cuevas, 94, sculptor (b. 1929)
  - Mike Kadish, 72, football player (Buffalo Bills) (b. 1950)
  - John Linebaugh, 67, weapons manufacturer (.500 Linebaugh, .475 Linebaugh) (b. 1955)
- March 20
  - Geof Kotila, 64, basketball player and coach (Michigan Tech Huskies) (b. 1959)
  - Michael Reaves, 72, screenwriter (Gargoyles, Batman: The Animated Series, Spider-Man Unlimited) (b. 1950)
- March 21
  - Fernand J. Cheri, 71, Roman Catholic prelate, auxiliary bishop of New Orleans (since 2015) (b. 1952)
  - Joe Giella, 94, comic book artist (b. 1928)
  - Bill Lewellen, 71, politician, member of the Arkansas Senate (1990–2000) (b. 1952)
  - Dan Morse, 84–85, bridge player (b. 1938)
  - Julie Anne Peters, 71, novelist (Keeping You a Secret, Luna, Between Mom and Jo) (b. 1952)
  - Leroy Raffel, 96, restaurateur and businessman, co-founder of Arby's (b. 1926)
  - Willis Reed, 80, Hall of Fame basketball player (New York Knicks) and coach (New Jersey Nets), NBA champion (1970, 1973) (b. 1942)
  - Pedro Velasco, 85, Olympic volleyball player (1964, 1968) (b. 1937)
  - Peter Werner, 76, film and television director (In the Region of Ice, Moonlighting, Grimm), Oscar winner (1976) (b. 1947)
- March 22
  - Rebecca Jones, 65, Mexican-born actress (Imperio de cristal, Para volver a amar, Que te perdone Dios) (b. 1957)
  - Ben Shelly, 75, politician, president of the Navajo Nation (2011–2015) (b. 1947)
  - Tom Leadon, 70, musician (Mudcrutch) (b. 1952)
  - Wayne Swinny, 59, guitarist (Saliva) (b. 1963)
  - Jeffrey Vandergrift, 55, radio presenter (The Dog House) (b. 1967)
- March 23
  - K. C. Constantine, 88, author (b. 1934)
  - Darcelle XV, 92, drag queen (b. 1930)
  - Jerry Green, 94, Hall of Fame sportswriter (Associated Press, The Detroit News) (b. 1928)
  - Joseph R. Inge, 75, lieutenant general (b. 1947)
  - Toichiro Kinoshita, 98, Japanese-born theoretical physicist (b. 1925)
  - Rita Lakin, 93, screenwriter (Peyton Place, The Doctors, The Rookies) (b. 1930)
  - Frank LeMaster, 71, football player (Philadelphia Eagles) (b. 1952)
  - Brendan O'Brien, 60, voice actor (Crash Bandicoot) (b. 1962)
  - Israel Zelitch, 98, plant pathologist and ecologist (b. 1924)
- March 24
  - Tim Joiner, 62, football player (Houston Oilers, Denver Broncos) (b. 1961)
  - Scott Johnson, 70, composer (b. 1952)
  - Gordon Moore, 94, businessman, engineer (Moore's law) and philanthropist, co-founder of Intel and Gordon and Betty Moore Foundation (b. 1929)
  - Randall Robinson, 81, lawyer, author, and activist (b. 1941)
- March 25
  - W. Onico Barker, 88, politician, member of the Virginia Senate (1980–1992) (b. 1934)
  - Chabelo, 88, American-born Mexican actor (The Extra, Escuela para solteras) and comedian (La Carabina de Ambrosio) (b. 1935)
  - Daniel Chorzempa, 78, organist and composer (b. 1944)
  - Barry Goldberg, 61, volleyball coach (American University) (b. 1962)
  - Leo D. Sullivan, 82, animator (Jabberjaw, BraveStarr, Taz-Mania) (b. 1940)
- March 26
  - Dan Ben-Amos, 88, folklorist and professor (b. 1934)
  - Keith Colson, 88, college basketball coach and athletics administrator (New Mexico State Aggies) (b. 1934)
  - Ron Faber, 90, actor (The Exorcist, Navy SEALs, The Private Files of J. Edgar Hoover) (b. 1933)
  - Rick Lantz, 85, football coach (Georgia Tech, Navy Midshipmen, Berlin Thunder) (b. 1938)
  - Ronnie Lee, 66, football player (Miami Dolphins, Seattle Seahawks, Atlanta Falcons) (b. 1956)
  - Virginia T. Norwood, 96, physicist (b. 1927)
  - Thomas J. Osler, 82, mathematician, long-distance runner and author (b. 1940)
  - Ray Pillow, 85, country singer ("I'll Take the Dog") (b. 1937)
  - Bill Zehme, 64, writer and journalist (b. 1958)
- March 27
  - Nick Galifianakis, 94, politician, member of the U.S. House of Representatives (1967–1973) and the North Carolina House of Representatives (1961–1967) (b. 1928)
  - N'Neka Garland, 49, television producer (General Hospital) (b. 1973)
  - Max Hardcore, 66, pornographic actor (b. 1956)
  - Charles Hough Jr., 88, equestrian, Olympic bronze medallist (1952) (b. 1934)
  - Howie Kane, 81, pop singer (Jay and the Americans) (b. 1945) (death announced on this date)
  - Carol Lavell, 79, equestrian, Olympic bronze medallist (1992) (b. 1943)
  - Ronald A. Sarasin, 88, politician, member of the U.S. House of Representatives (1973–1979) and the Connecticut House of Representatives (1969–1973) (b. 1934)
  - Peggy Scott-Adams, 74, blues and R&B singer (b. 1948)
- March 28
  - Mel King, 94, politician, member of the Massachusetts House of Representatives (1973–1983) (b. 1928)
  - Bill Leavy, 76, football official (b. 1947)
  - Mardye McDole, 63, football player (Minnesota Vikings) (b. 1959)
- March 29
  - Helen Barolini, 97, writer (Umbertina), editor, and translator (b. 1925)
  - Brian Gillis, 47, singer (LFO) (b. 1975)
  - David W. Hoyle, 84, politician, member of the North Carolina General Assembly (b. 1939)
  - Dragomir R. Radev, 54, computer scientist (b. 1968)
  - Sweet Charles Sherrell, 80, bassist (James Brown, The J.B.'s) (b. 1943)
- March 30
  - Michael Berlyn, 73, video game designer (Tass Times in Tonetown, Bubsy in Claws Encounters of the Furred Kind) (b. 1949) (death announced on this date)
  - Fred Klages, 79, baseball player (Chicago White Sox) (b. 1943)
  - Michael Rudman, 84, theatre director (b. 1939)
  - Mark Russell, 90, political satirist and comedian (b. 1932)
  - Steve Skeates, 80, comic book writer (Aquaman, Hawk and Dove, T.H.U.N.D.E.R. Agents) (b. 1943)
  - Bill Slocum, 75, politician, member of the Pennsylvania State Senate (1997–2000) (b. 1947)
- March 31
  - Ada Bello, 89, Cuban-born LGBT rights activist (b. 1933)
  - John Brockington, 74, football player (Green Bay Packers) (b. 1948)
  - Gene Derricotte, 96, football player (Michigan Wolverines) (b. 1926)
  - Raghavan Iyer, 61, Indian-born chef and author (b. 1961)
  - George Nagobads, 101, Latvian-born ice hockey team physician (United States national team, Minnesota Golden Gophers) (b. 1921)
  - Ricochet, 15, Golden Retriever surfing dog (b. 2008)
