= Deaths in March 2023 =

The following is a list of notable deaths in March 2023.

Entries for each day are listed alphabetically by surname. A typical entry lists information in the following sequence:

- Name, age, country of citizenship at birth, subsequent country of citizenship (if applicable), reason for notability, cause of death (if known), and reference.

== March 2023 ==
=== 1 ===
- Souley Abdoulaye, 66–67, Nigerien politician, prime minister (1994–1995).
- Ahmed Arab, 89, Algerian footballer (1960 Olympics, national team).
- Boris Bim-Bad, 81, Russian educator.
- William E. Cooper, 93, American major general.
- Ted Donaldson, 89, American actor (A Tree Grows in Brooklyn, Adventures of Rusty, Father Knows Best), complications from a fall.
- Charles Harrington Elster, 65, American writer and broadcaster (A Way with Words), cancer.
- Jonette Engan, 71, American politician.
- Wally Fawkes, 98, Canadian-British jazz clarinettist and satirical cartoonist.
- Just Fontaine, 89, French footballer (Nice, Reims, national team).
- Leon Hughes, 92, American musician (The Coasters).
- Bill Hunter, 85, Scottish businessman.
- Ab van Kammen, 90, Dutch molecular biologist and virologist.
- Olga Kennard, 98, Hungarian-born British crystallographer, founder of the Cambridge Crystallographic Data Centre.
- Anise Koltz, 94, Luxembourgish author.
- Marguerite Martel, 98, French Olympic long jumper (1948).
- Dan McGinn, 79, American baseball player (Montreal Expos, Chicago Cubs, Cincinnati Reds).
- Allan McGraw, 83, Scottish football player (Hibernian, Linfield) and manager (Greenock Morton).
- Lorna Milne, 88, Canadian academic and politician, senator (1995–2009).
- Pintu Nanda, 45, Indian actor (Saathire, Mate Ta Love Helare, Love Express), cirrhosis.
- Milt Pahl, 79, Canadian politician, Alberta MLA (1979–1986).
- Julian Peter, Pakistani army major general.
- Neela Ramgopal, 87, Indian Carnatic vocalist.
- Jerry Richardson, 86, American football player (Baltimore Colts) and executive (Carolina Panthers).
- Warren Saunders, 88, Australian cricketer (New South Wales).
- Irma Serrano, 89, Mexican actress (Tiburoneros, El monasterio de los buitres, Las amantes del señor de la noche) and singer, heart attack.
- Carlo Stelluti, 78, Italian politician, deputy (1996–2001).
- Joseph Edra Ukpo, 85, Nigerian Roman Catholic prelate, auxiliary bishop (1971–1973) and bishop (1973–2003) of Ogoja, archbishop of Calabar (2003–2013).
- Boybits Victoria, 50, Filipino basketball player (Pop Cola Panthers, San Miguel Beermen), heart attack.
- Peter Weibel, 78, Austrian post-conceptual artist.
- Colin Wilcockson, 90, British medievalist and literary scholar.

=== 2 ===
- Aziz Mushabber Ahmadi, 90, Indian jurist, chief justice (1994–1997), chancellor of Aligarh Muslim University (2003–2010).
- Awesome Feather, 14, American Thoroughbred racehorse, Breeders' Cup Juvenile Fillies winner (2010).
- Mary Bauermeister, 88, German visual artist (Fluxus).
- Giuseppe Cacciatore, 77, Italian philosopher, member of the Accademia dei Lincei.
- Maurice Cullinane, 90, American police officer.
- Chandrashekhar Dasgupta, 82, Indian diplomat, ambassador to China (1993–1996) and the European Union (1996–2000).
- Lokenath Debnath, 87, Indian-American mathematician, founder of the International Journal of Mathematics and Mathematical Sciences.
- Mabel Desmond, 94, Canadian-born American teacher and politician, member of the Maine House of Representatives (1994–2002).
- Frank Dickson, 91, New Zealand banker.
- Duncan Hendry, 71, Scottish theatre manager.
- Theodore Kanamine, 93, American brigadier general, cancer.
- Edward Kane, 87, American economist and writer.
- Bassma Kodmani, 64, Syrian academic and political dissident, cancer.
- Per Kristoffersen, 85, Norwegian footballer (Fredrikstad, national team).
- Steve Mackey, 56, English bassist (Pulp) and record producer.
- José Molíns, 90, Spanish Olympic long-distance runner (1960).
- Bertie O'Brien, 71, Irish hurler and Gaelic footballer (St Finbarr's, Cork GAA).
- Ryuho Okawa, 66, Japanese religious leader, founder of Happy Science.
- María Onetto, 56, Argentine actress (Montecristo, The Headless Woman, The Heavy Hand of the Law), suicide.
- Dell Raybould, 89, American politician, member of the Idaho House of Representatives (2000–2018).
- Sepp Reif, 85, German Olympic ice hockey player (1960, 1964, 1968).
- C. Paul Robinson, 81, American physicist.
- Wayne Shorter, 89, American jazz saxophonist (The Jazz Messengers, Miles Davis Quintet, Weather Report), 12-time Grammy winner.
- Nicholas Snowman, 78, British arts administrator, fall.
- Margherita Spiluttini, 75, Austrian photographer.
- Gothart Stier, 84, German singer.
- John Stobart, 93, British maritime artist.
- Rafael Viñoly, 78, Uruguayan architect (432 Park Avenue, 20 Fenchurch Street), aneurysm.
- Joan Williamson-Orr, 92, New Zealand politician, mayor of Taupō (1988–2001).
- Joachim Zeller, 70, German politician, MEP (2009–2019).
- Jan Żurawski, 91, Polish Olympic wrestler (1960).

=== 3 ===
- Beatrice Aboyade, 87, Nigerian librarian and academic.
- Bruno Astorre, 59, Italian politician, senator (since 2013), suicide by jumping.
- Francisco J. Ayala, 88, Spanish-American evolutionary biologist and philosopher.
- Barbara Everitt Bryant, 96, American market researcher, director of the United States Census Bureau (1989–1993).
- Robert Chase, 84, British football executive, chairman of Norwich City F.C. (1985–1996).
- Sasthipada Chattopadhyay, 81, Indian novelist (Pandab Goenda), stroke.
- Chicita F. Culberson, 91, American lichenologist.
- Edwin A. Dawes, 97, British biochemist and magician.
- Peter Dodge, 72, American meteorologist, stroke.
- Christopher Fowler, 69, English novelist, cancer.
- Carlos Garnett, 84, Panamanian-American jazz saxophonist.
- Mohie El Din El Ghareeb, 90, Egyptian economist and politician, minister of finance (1996–1999).
- Hiroshi Imai, 81, Japanese politician, MP (1993–2000, 2003–2009), aspiration pneumonia.
- Antal Jancsó, 88, Hungarian tennis player.
- Sara Lane, 73, American actress (The Virginian, I Saw What You Did), breast cancer.
- Dane Lanken, 77, Canadian author and journalist.
- Lee San Choon, 87, Malaysian politician, MP (1959–1983), minister of labour (1974–1978) and transport (1979–1983).
- Pierre Legendre, 92, French historian and psychoanalyst.
- David Lindley, 78, American musician (Kaleidoscope, The Section) and singer ("Mercury Blues").
- Jaak Lipso, 82, Estonian basketball player (CSKA Moscow), Olympic silver medallist (1964).
- Julien Manzano, 85, French footballer (Forbach, Red Star, Boulogne).
- Argentina Menis, 74, Romanian discus thrower, Olympic silver medallist (1972).
- Satyabrata Mookherjee, 90, Indian politician, MP (1999–2004).
- Franco Mulas, 84, Italian painter.
- Calvin Newton, 93, American gospel singer (The Oak Ridge Boys, Sons of Song).
- Kenzaburō Ōe, 88, Japanese novelist (A Personal Matter, The Silent Cry), Nobel Prize laureate (1994).
- Rita O'Hare, 80, Northern Irish political activist.
- Yana Rykhlitska, 29, Ukrainian combat medic, military combat.
- Alexandru Scripcenco, 32, Moldovan footballer (FC Dinamo-Auto Tiraspol, Iskra-Stal Rîbniţa, Sheriff Tiraspol).
- Tom Sizemore, 61, American actor (Saving Private Ryan, Black Hawk Down, Heat), complications from a brain aneurysm.
- Camille Souter, 93, British-born Irish artist.
- Lou Stovall, 86, American painter.
- Yuri Zhukov, 85, Russian historian.

=== 4 ===
- Romualdo Arppi Filho, 84, Brazilian football referee, kidney disease.
- Dietmar Artzinger-Bolten, 82, German lawyer and politician, president of 1. FC Köln (1987–1991).
- Allison Bailey, 33, American whistleblower and former Sergeant First Class in the Nevada National Guard.
- Phil Batt, 96, American politician, governor of Idaho (1995–1999), member of the Idaho House of Representatives (1965–1967) and twice of the Senate.
- Heinz Baumann, 95, German actor (I'm an Elephant, Madame, Und Jimmy ging zum Regenbogen, All People Will Be Brothers).
- Jacques Boigelot, 93, Belgian film director (Peace in the Fields) and screenwriter.
- Paulo Caruso, 73, Brazilian cartoonist.
- Sueli Costa, 79, Brazilian composer and singer.
- Roel Degamo, 56, Filipino politician, governor of Negros Oriental (since 2011), shot.
- Joseph Gabriel Fernandez, 97, Indian Roman Catholic prelate, bishop of Quilon (1978–2001).
- Louise Archambault Greaves, 90, American filmmaker.
- Robert Haimer, 69, American musician (Barnes & Barnes) and songwriter ("Fish Heads").
- Patti Hammond, 91, American football superfan (Seattle Seahawks).
- Judith Heumann, 75, American disability rights activist.
- Jan Lambrecht, 96, Belgian Catholic priest.
- John Nagenda, 84, Ugandan cricketer (East Africa, national team).
- John Oostrom, 92, Dutch-born Canadian politician.
- Yaroslava Plaviuk, 96, Ukrainian women's rights activist, first lady in exile (1989–1992).
- János Rácz, 81, Hungarian Olympic basketball player (1964).
- Michael Rhodes, 69, American bassist (The Notorious Cherry Bombs).
- Jean-Michel Rosenfeld, 88, French Holocaust survivor and politician.
- Andre Smith, 64, American basketball player (Nebraska Cornhuskers).
- Donald Snyder, 71, American politician, member of the Pennsylvania House of Representatives (1981–2000).
- Spot, 71, American record producer (Damaged, Milo Goes to College, Zen Arcade).
- Leo Sterckx, 86, Belgian cyclist, Olympic silver medallist (1960).
- Christos Zanteroglou, 82, Greek footballer (Olympiacos, Egaleo, national team).

=== 5 ===
- Azwar Anas, 91, Indonesian politician, coordinating minister for people's welfare (1993–1998), minister of transportation (1988–1993) and governor of West Sumatra (1977–1987).
- Richard Aylmer, 91, British Olympic cross-country skier (1956).
- Klaus Bonsack, 81, German luger, Olympic champion (1968).
- Arif Cooper, Jamaican musician, record producer and DJ.
- Diane Corcoran, 76, American colonel and nurse.
- Hilde De Ridder-Symoens, 79, Belgian historian.
- Heen Banda Dissanayaka, 85, Sri Lankan civil servant, governor of the Central Bank of Ceylon (1992–1995).
- Joanne Elliott, 97, American mathematician.
- Claire Etcherelli, 89, French novelist.
- Sharifa Fadel, 84, Egyptian singer and actress.
- Piero Gilardi, 80, Italian sculptor.
- Bob Goodman, 83, American Hall of Fame boxing promoter.
- Bob Goody, 71, British actor (Flash Gordon, Fire, Ice and Dynamite, Lighthouse) and writer, cancer.
- Frank Griswold, 85, American clergyman, presiding bishop of the Episcopal Church (1998–2006).
- Antal Hetényi, 75, Hungarian Olympic judoka (1972).
- Tom Hsieh, 91, American politician, member of the San Francisco Board of Supervisors (1986–1997).
- Gardner Hurley, 90, Canadian politician.
- Ilkka Järvi-Laturi, 61, Finnish-born American film director (Spy Games).
- Allan Jay, 91, British fencer, double Olympic silver medallist (1960), COVID-19.
- Karounga Keïta, 81, Malian football player (Girondins de Bordeaux) and official.
- Qavi Khan, 80, Pakistani actor (Mitti Ke Putlay, Begum Jaan, Nahin Abhi Nahin), cancer.
- Takahiro Kimura, 58, Japanese animator (City Hunter, Brigadoon: Marin & Melan, Godannar), amyloidosis.
- Matti Klinge, 86, Finnish historian.
- Andrew Linklater, 73, British international relations scholar.
- Tate Makgoe, 59, South African politician and anti-apartheid activist, Free State MPL (since 1994), traffic collision.
- Kenneth Montgomery, 79, British conductor, pneumonia.
- Eugeniusz Olszyna, 69, Polish footballer (Lech Poznań).
- Pierluigi Onorato, 84, Italian magistrate and politician, deputy (1979–1987), senator (1987–1992).
- Mark Pilgrim, 53, South African radio broadcaster (5FM, 94.7 Highveld Stereo) and television presenter (Big Brother Africa), lung cancer.
- Pedro Rodrigues Filho, 68, Brazilian serial killer, shot.
- Gary Rossington, 71, American Hall of Fame guitarist (Lynyrd Skynyrd, Rossington Collins Band).
- Shozo Sasahara, 93, Japanese wrestler, Olympic champion (1956).
- Maurice Scully, 70–71, Irish poet.
- Ahuva Sherman, 96, Israeli artist.
- Sylviane Telchid, 81, Guadeloupean writer, complications from Alzheimer's disease.
- Fred M. Utter, 91, American oceanographer.
- Imre Vagyóczki, 90, Hungarian Olympic sprint canoer (1956).
- Helen Vanni, 99, American opera singer.
- Dave Wills, 58, American sportscaster (Tampa Bay Rays, Chicago White Sox).

=== 6 ===
- Ryuzan Aki, 80, Japanese manga artist, Shogakukan Manga Award recipient, heart attack.
- Abdulrahman al-Ansary, 87, Saudi Arabian archaeologist.
- Masum Babul, 60, Bangladeshi film dance director and choreographer (Beder Meye Josna, Keyamat Theke Keyamat, Ekti Cinemar Golpo).
- Georgina Beyer, 65, New Zealand politician and transgender rights activist, mayor of Carterton (1995–2000) and MP (1999–2007).
- Harvey Carignan, 95, American serial killer.
- Artak Davtyan, 56, Armenian economist and politician, member of the National Assembly (2007–2017).
- Sergey Grishin, 56, Russian-American businessman and engineer.
- Ivana Hloužková, 62, Czech actress (The Fortress, Boredom in Brno).
- Władysław Janecki, 88, Polish politician, MP (1985–1989).
- Jörg Jarnut, 81, German historian.
- Pavel Kharin, 95, Russian sprint canoeist, Olympic champion (1956).
- Traute Lafrenz, 103, German-American resistance fighter (White Rose).
- Reginald McFadden, 70, American serial killer.
- Toru Miyoshi, 95, Japanese judge, chief justice (1995–1997).
- Ken Money, 88, Canadian astronaut, scientist, and Olympic high jumper (1956).
- Seiko Obonai, 83, Japanese Olympic shot putter (1964).
- Irvo Otieno, 28, Kenyan-born American prisoner, asphyxiation.
- Benigno Luigi Papa, 87, Italian Roman Catholic prelate, archbishop of Taranto (1990–2011) and bishop of Oppido Mamertina-Palmi (1981–1990).
- Spiros Papadopoulos, 91, Greek politician, MP (1985–1993).
- Gérard Pelisson, 91, French hotelier, co-founder of Accor.
- Alfonso Quaranta, 87, Italian magistrate, president of the Constitutional Court (2011–2013).
- M. A. Ramlu, 96, Indian academic.
- Alan C. Riebel, 95, American politician.
- Kuppuswami Sampath, 75, Indian footballer (Dempo, national team).
- Heinz Schwarz, 94, German politician, MP (1976–1990), minister of the interior of Rhineland-Palatinate (1971–1976) and member of the Landtag (1959–1976).
- Wally Smith, 96, British-born American mathematician.
- Wyndham St. John, 63, Canadian Olympic equestrian (2000).
- Mario Telò, 72, Italian political scientist and researcher.
- Tom Van Sant, 92, American sculptor.
- Josef Vojta, 87, Czech footballer (Sparta Prague, Czechoslovakia national team), Olympic silver medallist (1964).
- Wang Xiaomo, 84, Chinese radar engineer, member of the Chinese Academy of Engineering and deputy (1998–2008).

=== 7 ===
- Ibtisam Abdallah, 80, Iraqi writer and translator.
- Vlastislav Antolák, 80, Czech teacher and politician, deputy (2002–2006).
- Michael Brimer, 89, South African-Australian organist, pianist, and conductor.
- Mik Critchlow, 68, British photographer.
- Ronnie Delport, 91, South African cricketer.
- Shirley du Boulay, 90, British author.
- Ian Falconer, 63, American author (Olivia) and illustrator (The New Yorker), kidney failure.
- Salvador Farfán, 90, Mexican footballer (Atlante, national team).
- Władysław Findeisen, 97, Polish control theorist, academic, and politician, senator (1989–1993).
- Salvador García-Bodaño, 87, Spanish poet, member of the Royal Galician Academy (since 1992).
- E. Thurman Gaskill, 87, American politician, member of the Iowa Senate (1997–2009).
- Marcel Gatsinzi, 75, Rwandan politician, minister of defence (2002–2010).
- Denise Goddard, 77, British Olympic artistic gymnast (1964).
- Kevin Alexander Gray, 65, American political activist and author.
- J. A. W. Gunn, 85, Canadian political philosopher.
- André Haefliger, 93, Swiss mathematician (Haefliger structure).
- Alice Sterling Honig, 93, American child psychologist.
- Anton Ionescu, 83, Romanian politician, deputy (1996–2004).
- José Ramón Irusquieta, 82, Spanish footballer (Real Zaragoza).
- Lisa Janti, 89, American actress (World Without End, Ten Thousand Bedrooms).
- Prafulla Kumar Jena, 91, Indian metallurgist, member of the Indian Academy of Sciences.
- Cecil Kippins, 98, Guyanese cricket umpire.
- Dmytro Kotsiubailo, 27, Ukrainian soldier, shot.
- Augusto Lauro, 99, Italian Roman Catholic prelate, bishop of San Marco Argentano-Scalea (1979–1999).
- Tom Love, 85, American entrepreneur, founder of Love's.
- Pat McCormick, 92, American diver, four-time Olympic champion (1952, 1956).
- Y C McNease, 87, American college football coach.
- Jitendra Nath Mohanty, 95, Indian philosopher.
- Siphamandla Mtolo, 29, South African footballer (Richards Bay).
- Herbert Richardson, 72, American politician, member of the New Hampshire House of Representatives (2002–2006, 2008–2018).
- Lynn Seymour, 83, Canadian-born British ballerina and choreographer.
- Bill Siderewicz, 87, American football coach.
- Khatijun Nissa Siraj, 97, Singaporean women's rights activist.
- Peterson Zah, 85, American politician, president of the Navajo Nation (1991–1995).
- Andrei Zlotnikov, 52, Belarusian sociologist and politician, deputy (since 2019).

=== 8 ===
- Ali Bilal, 40, Pakistani political worker.
- Marcel Amont, 93, French singer.
- Paul Anselin, 91, French politician, mayor of Ploërmel (1977–2008).
- Richard A. N. Bonnycastle, 88, Canadian business executive (Harlequin Enterprises).
- Hendrik Brocks, 80, Indonesian Olympic cyclist (1960).
- Gianmarco Calleri, 81, Italian football player (Novara) and executive, president of Lazio (1986–1992) and Torino (1994–1997).
- Junior Daugherty, 92, American fiddler and guitarist.
- Philippe Fauveau, 96, French Olympic rower (1948).
- Italo Galbiati, 85, Italian football player (Lecco) and manager (Milan).
- Bert I. Gordon, 100, American film director and screenwriter (Village of the Giants, Empire of the Ants, The Amazing Colossal Man).
- Martin Gorry, 68, English footballer (Barnsley, Hartlepool United, Newcastle United).
- Roland Hürzeler, 77, Swiss Olympic gymnast (1968).
- Ranjeet Singh Judeo, 80, Indian politician, Uttar Pradesh MLA.
- Satish Kaushik, 66, Indian film director (Hum Aapke Dil Mein Rehte Hain), actor (Mr. India, Brick Lane), and comedian, heart attack.
- Jean-Marie Kieffer, 62, Luxembourgish composer.
- Dolores Klaich, 86, American author and activist, assisted suicide.
- Pentti Koskinen, 79, Finnish Olympic diver (1964, 1968, 1972).
- Jose David Lapuz, 84, Filipino educator and administrator.
- Sverre Olaf Lie, 85, Norwegian pediatrician.
- Dušan Mirković, 69, Yugoslav Olympic weightlifter (1980). (death announced on this date)
- John Moelaert, 80, Belgian footballer (Cercle Brugge, Club Brugge), heart failure.
- Jim Moeller, 67, American politician, member of the Washington House of Representatives (2003–2017), complications from Parkinson's disease.
- Tish Naghise, 59, American politician, member of the Georgia House of Representatives (since 2023).
- Grace Onyango, 98, Kenyan politician, mayor of Kisumu (1965–1969) and MP (1969–1983).
- Chaim Topol, 87, Israeli actor (Fiddler on the Roof, Flash Gordon, For Your Eyes Only), complications from Alzheimer's disease.

=== 9 ===
- Azagaia, 38, Mozambican rapper, complications from epilepsy.
- Robert Blake, 89, American actor (Baretta, In Cold Blood, Lost Highway), Emmy winner (1975), heart disease.
- Roland Castro, 82, French architect and political activist.
- Michel Côté, 85, Canadian politician, member of the National Assembly of Quebec (1994–2003).
- William R. Cotter, 87, American lawyer, president of Colby College (1979–2000).
- Marguerite M. Engler, 67, American nurse scientist and physiologist.
- Lily Yulianti Farid, 51, Indonesian writer, researcher and cultural activist.
- Hassan Ghafourifard, 79, Iranian academic and politician, minister of energy (1981–1985) and three-time MP.
- Chris Greeley, 60, American politician, member of the Maine House of Representatives (2002–2010).
- Shiro Hashizume, 94, Japanese swimmer, Olympic silver medallist (1952), prostate cancer.
- Heart's Cry, 21, Japanese Thoroughbred racehorse, winner of the Arima Kinen (2005) and Dubai Sheema Classic (2006).
- Bryan Horskins, 77, Australian rules footballer (Hawthorn).
- Alan Jones, 77, Welsh footballer (Hereford United, Swansea City, Southport).
- Hisashi Kobayashi, 84, Japanese engineer, dean of Princeton University School of Engineering and Applied Science (1986–1991).
- Paul Locht, 93, Danish Olympic rower (1952).
- Robin Lumley, 74, British jazz keyboardist (Brand X), heart failure.
- Connie Martinson, 90, American writer and television personality.
- Raphael Mechoulam, 92, Bulgarian-born Israeli organic chemist.
- McNeil Moore, 89, American football player (Chicago Bears).
- Daud Muzamil, Afghan Taliban politician and militant, governor of Nangarhar (2021–2022) and of Balkh (since 2022), bombing.
- Mystic Meg, 80, British astrologer, influenza.
- Dave Nicoll, 78, British motocross racer.
- Chikage Oogi, 89, Japanese actress (A Teapicker's Song of Goodbye) and politician, president of the House of Councillors (2004–2007) and minister of land (2001–2003), esophageal cancer.
- Samaraditya Pal, 84, Indian lawyer.
- Daryl W. Preston, 94, American astronomer and physicist.
- Fazalur Rehman, 81, Pakistani field hockey player, Olympic champion (1968).
- Sir Sebastian Roberts, 69, British major general.
- Al Jawhara bint Abdulaziz Al Saud, Saudi Arabian royal.
- Randhir Singh, 65, Indian cricketer (national team).
- Tanja Heiberg Storm, 76, Norwegian diplomat, ambassador to the OECD (2001–2006).
- Jan Syczewski, 85, Polish politician, MP (1997–2001).
- Otis Taylor, 80, American football player (Kansas City Chiefs), Super Bowl champion (1970), complications from Parkinson's disease.
- Pearry Reginald Teo, 44, Singaporean film director (The Gene Generation, Witchville, The Curse of Sleeping Beauty) and producer.
- Fernando Valdés Dal-Ré, 77, Spanish jurist and academic, magistrate of the Constitutional Court (2012–2020).
- Ken Wagner, 75, American football coach.
- Kiska, 47, captive orca

=== 10 ===
- Jesús Alou, 80, Dominican baseball player (San Francisco Giants, Houston Astros, Oakland Athletics), World Series champion (1973, 1974).
- Skip Bafalis, 93, American politician, member of the U.S. House of Representatives (1973–1983), Florida Senate (1966–1970), and Florida House of Representatives (1964–1966).
- William R. C. Blundell, 95, Canadian business executive.
- David Bottoms, 73, American poet.
- Niall Brophy, 87, Irish rugby union player (Leinster, national team, British & Irish Lions).
- Alwin Bully, 74, Dominican cultural administrator, playwright and artist, designer of the flag of Dominica.
- Junior English, 71, Jamaican reggae singer.
- Kevin Freeman, 81, American equestrian, Olympic silver medalist (1964, 1968, 1972).
- Naonobu Fujii, 31, Japanese volleyball player (Toray Arrows, national team), stomach cancer.
- Juan Francisco García Sánchez, 86, Spanish judge, magistrate of the Supreme Court (1999–2006).
- Antonín Hájek, 35, Czech Olympic ski jumper (2010, 2014). (death announced on this date)
- Dick Haley, 85, American football player (Washington Redskins, Minnesota Vikings, Pittsburgh Steelers).
- Rolland Hein, 90, American college professor and scholar.
- Byron Hyland, 93, Australian cricketer.
- Masatoshi Ito, 98, Japanese businessman (7-Eleven).
- Seiichi Kaneta, 75, Japanese politician, MP (1993–2009), cerebral hemorrhage.
- Goff Letts, 95, Australian politician, majority leader of the Northern Territory (1974–1977).
- Renán López, 83, Bolivian footballer (Jorge Wilstermann, national team).
- Rafael de Mendizábal Allende, 95, Spanish judge, president of the National Court (1977–1986, 1991–1992) and magistrate of the Constitutional Court (1992–2001).
- Napoleon XIV, 84, American singer ("They're Coming to Take Me Away, Ha-Haaa!").
- René Olmeta, 88, French politician, deputy (1981–1986).
- Juvencio Osorio, 72, Paraguayan footballer (Cerro Porteño, Espanyol, national team).
- Dhiruben Patel, 96, Indian novelist, playwright and translator.
- Demetrio Perez Jr., 77, Cuban-American educator and politician.
- Ayşegül Sarıca, 87, Turkish concert pianist.
- Vefa Tanır, 96, Turkish politician, minister of national defense (1995–1996), forestry (1991–1993) and twice of health.
- Tongo, 65, Peruvian singer and comedian, kidney failure.
- Anthony Verga, 87, American politician, member of the Massachusetts House of Representatives (1995–2009).
- Tony Vincent, 97, American tennis player.
- Sheila Watt, 82, British Olympic swimmer (1960).
- Janusz Weiss, 74, Polish radio broadcaster, co-founder of Radio ZET.
- Michael Wilford, 84, English architect (The Lowry, Embassy of the United Kingdom, Berlin).
- William Wulf, 83, American computer scientist.
- Noriaki Yamada, 71, Japanese politician, member (1995–2014) and chairman (2012–2013) of the Ishikawa Prefectural Assembly, fall.

=== 11 ===
- Wendy Barker, 80, American poet.
- Ernst Behringer, 81, German politician, member of the Landtag of Baden-Württemberg (1994–2011).
- Ahlem Belhadj, 59, Tunisian women's rights activist.
- Erik Rud Brandt, 79, Danish fashion designer.
- Chen Kenichi, 67, Japanese chef (Iron Chef), interstitial lung disease.
- Chuanyin, 96, Chinese Buddhist monk, master of the Buddhist Association of China (2005–2010).
- R. Dhruvanarayana, 61, Indian politician, MP (2009–2019), cardiac arrest.
- Oleksandr Dovbiy, 69, Ukrainian football player (Metalist Kharkiv, SKA Kyiv) and manager (Naftovyk Okhtyrka).
- Amy Fuller, 54, American rower, Olympic silver medalist (1992), complications from breast cancer.
- Bud Grant, 95, American basketball player (Minneapolis Lakers), Hall of Fame football player (Winnipeg Blue Bombers) and coach (Minnesota Vikings).
- Guo Zhi, 98, Chinese politician, deputy (1978–1998).
- Angel Hobayan, 93, Filipino Roman Catholic prelate, bishop of Catarman (1975–2005).
- Eric Iles, 95, Australian politician, member of the Tasmanian House of Assembly (1966–1969).
- John Jakes, 90, American author (North and South, The Kent Family Chronicles).
- Jiang Yanyong, 91, Chinese physician and political dissident, pneumonia.
- William G. Johnsson, 88, Australian author.
- Keith Johnstone, 90, British-Canadian theatre director and educator (Impro: Improvisation and the Theatre).
- Karoline Käfer, 68, Austrian Olympic sprinter (1972, 1980).
- Ignacio López Tarso, 98, Mexican actor (Rosa Blanca, Esmeralda, Wild at Heart), pneumonia.
- Alexandru Mesian, 86, Romanian Greek Catholic hierarch, coadjutor bishop (1994–1995) and bishop (since 1995) of Lugoj.
- Takeshi Noma, 88, Japanese politician, member of the House of Councillors (1992–2004).
- Ivonne Passada, 66, Uruguayan politician, MP (2005–2020) and speaker of the Chamber of Representatives (2010–2011).
- Michel Peyramaure, 101, French writer.
- David Reed, 96, American Anglican clergyman, bishop of Colombia (1964–1972) and Kentucky (1974–1994).
- Piero Sartogo, 88, Italian architect (Embassy of Italy, Washington, D.C.).
- Dimitrij Skolil, 92, Czechoslovak slalom canoeist.
- Bill Tidy, 89, British cartoonist (The Cloggies, The Fosdyke Saga).
- Costa Titch, 27, South African rapper.
- Derek Weddle, 87, English footballer (Sunderland, Darlington, York City).
- Ann Wilson, 91, American painter.

=== 12 ===
- Hussein Abu al-Khair, 57, Jordanian drug smuggler, executed.
- Franca Afegbua, 79, Nigerian politician, senator (1983).
- Roberto Barbon, 89, Cuban-born Japanese baseball player (Hankyu Braves, Kintetsu Buffaloes), pneumonia.
- Dame Phyllida Barlow, 78, British visual artist.
- Alphonse Beni, 77, Cameroonian actor and film director.
- Warren Boroson, 88, American journalist, educator, and author, chronic obstructive pulmonary disease.
- Isabel Colegate, 91, British author (The Shooting Party) and literary agent.
- Chris Cooper, 44, American-Italian baseball player (San Marino, Italy national team), heart attack.
- Rolly Crump, 93, American animator and designer (Walt Disney Imagineering).
- Anatoly Dryukov, 86, Russian diplomat, ambassador to Singapore (1987–1990), India (1991–1996), and Armenia (1998–2005).
- Dick Fosbury, 76, American high jumper (Fosbury flop), Olympic champion (1968), lymphoma.
- Tom French, 88, Northern Irish politician, complications from Parkinson's disease.
- Karel Kaplan, 94, Czech historian.
- Liam Kearns, 60, Irish Gaelic football player (Austin Stacks) and manager (Offaly, Limerick).
- Marek Kopelent, 90, Czech composer and composition professor (Academy of Fine Arts, Prague).
- Li Laizhu, 90, Chinese military officer, commander of the Beijing Military Region (1993–1997) and deputy (1988–1993).
- Susan Cunliffe-Lister, Baroness Masham of Ilton, 87, British politician, member of the House of Lords (since 1970) and Paralympic champion (1960, 1964).
- Jaume Medina, 73, Spanish philologist.
- Dragoslav Mihailović, 92, Serbian writer.
- Hedley Muscroft, 84, English golfer.
- Gyula Németh, 63, Hungarian high jumper.
- Rudel Obreja, 57, Romanian Olympic boxer (1984).
- Antônio Pedro, 82, Brazilian actor (Casa da Mãe Joana, Casa da Mãe Joana 2, Muito Prazer).
- Ondrej Šima, 86, Slovak Olympic sport shooter (1968).
- Felton Spencer, 55, American basketball player (Minnesota Timberwolves, Utah Jazz, Golden State Warriors).
- Joseph Edward Troy, 91, Canadian Roman Catholic prelate, coadjutor bishop (1984–1986) and bishop (1986–1997) of Saint John, New Brunswick.

=== 13 ===
- Denis Bovey, 93, Scottish Episcopalian priest, dean of Aberdeen and Orkney (1983–1988).
- Bob Breitenstein, 79, American football player (Denver Broncos, Atlanta Falcons, Minnesota Vikings).
- Nicholas Calabrese, 80, American contract killer.
- Simon Emmerson, 67, English musician (Weekend, Working Week, Afro Celt Sound System), record producer and DJ.
- Jim Gordon, 77, American drummer (Derek and the Dominos, Traffic), songwriter ("Layla") and convicted murderer.
- Terry Grier, 86, Canadian university administrator and politician, MP (1972–1974).
- Donald Hinds, 89, Jamaican writer, journalist, and teacher.
- Mabo Ismaila, 78, Nigerian football manager (women's national team).
- Eden Knight, 23, Saudi Arabian trans woman, suicide.
- Momoko Kuroda, 84, Japanese poet and essayist, brain hemorrhage.
- Edward Leavy, 93, American jurist, judge of the U.S. District Court for Oregon (1984–1987) and U.S. Court of Appeals for the Ninth Circuit (since 1987).
- Mario Masini, 84, Italian cinematographer (Padre Padrone, Our Lady of the Turks, The Perfume of the Lady in Black) and film director.
- Jack McLaughlin, 93, Australian cricketer (Queensland).
- Karol Mikuláš, 100, Slovak miner.
- Eliseu Padilha, 77, Brazilian lawyer and politician, chief of staff of the presidency (2016–2019), minister of transport (1997–2001) and three-time deputy.
- Joe Pepitone, 82, American baseball player (New York Yankees, Houston Astros, Chicago Cubs), World Series champion (1962).
- Jennifer Rahim, 60, Trinidadian writer, poet, and literary critic.
- Tom Ryan, 81, Irish hurler (Killenaule, Tipperary).
- Pat Schroeder, 82, American politician, member of the U.S. House of Representatives (1973–1997), complications from a stroke.
- Vera Selby, 93, English snooker and billiards player.
- Chris Shevlane, 80, Scottish footballer (Heart of Midlothian, Hibernian, Greenock Morton).
- Cyprian Tseriwa, 86, Zimbabwean Olympic runner (1960).
- Ernst Tugendhat, 93, Czechoslovak-born German philosopher.
- Marija Ujević-Galetović, 89, Croatian sculptor.
- Pradeep Uppoor, 65, Indian film producer (Ardh Satya, Aghaat, Chakra).
- Glen Weir, 71, Canadian Hall of Fame football player (Montreal Alouettes).
- Barbro Westerholm, 89, Swedish doctor and politician, MP (1988–1999, 2006–2022).
- Eric Lloyd Wright, 93, American architect.

=== 14 ===
- Alexander Andreev, 82, Russian theoretical physicist.
- Sam Bell, 83, American politician, member of the Florida House of Representatives (1974–1988).
- Gloria Bosman, 50, South African jazz singer.
- Bobby Caldwell, 71, American singer ("What You Won't Do for Love") and songwriter ("The Next Time I Fall").
- Jacques Cossette-Trudel, 76, Canadian screenwriter and political activist (Front de libération du Québec).
- Laurie Daniel, 81, Welsh rugby union player (Newport, Pontypool, national team).
- Louisette Dussault, 82, Canadian actress (Françoise Durocher, Waitress, IXE-13, Wedding Night) and writer.
- Jim Ferree, 91, American golfer.
- Ángel Floro Martínez, 83, Spanish Roman Catholic prelate, bishop of Gokwe (2000–2017).
- Sergei Grigoryants, 81, Russian human rights activist and Soviet dissident.
- Leslie Hardcastle, 96, British arts administrator (BFI).
- Kim Yong-chul, 98, South Korean jurist and judge, chief justice (1986–1988).
- Arne Kjörnsberg, 87, Swedish politician, MP (1985–2006).
- Valery Loshchinin, 82, Russian diplomat, ambassador to Belarus (1996–1999).
- Andrzej Mazurkiewicz, 81, Polish footballer (Lech Poznań).
- R. Kenton Musgrave, 95, American jurist, judge of the United States Court of International Trade (since 1987).
- Luigi Piccatto, 68, Italian comic artist (Dylan Dog).
- Nukhim Rashkovsky, 76, Russian chess player and coach, Grandmaster (1980).
- Saida Sherif, 90, Pakistani-British broadcaster, educationalist, humanitarian and poet.
- Janet Sinsheimer, 65, American biostatistician.
- Betty Glassman Trachtenberg, 89, American college administrator (Yale College).
- Antonina Uccello, 100, American politician, mayor of Hartford, Connecticut (1967–1971).
- Ved Pratap Vaidik, 78, Indian journalist, fall.
- Dale K. Van Kley, 81, American historian.
- Richard Wagner, 70, Romanian-born German novelist.

=== 15 ===
- Sir Geoffrey Allen, 94, British chemist.
- Théo de Barros, 80, Brazilian composer and musician (Quarteto Novo).
- Dorothy Bohm, 98, German-born British photographer.
- Chinga Chavin, 78, American musician and advertising executive.
- Pierluigi Concutelli, 78, Italian terrorist (Ordine Nuovo) and convicted murderer.
- Ron Cooper, 95, British Olympic boxer (1948).
- Peter Day, 76, British broadcaster.
- Jeff Gaylord, 64, American professional wrestler (UWF, WCCW) and football player (Toronto Argonauts).
- Edwin Grech, 94, Maltese politician.
- Stuart Hodes, 98, American dancer.
- Odd Hoftun, 95, Norwegian engineer and missionary.
- James F. Hutchinson, 90, American painter.
- Sameer Khakhar, 70, Indian actor (Nukkad, Pushpaka Vimana, Shahenshah), multiple organ failure.
- Jüri Kraft, 88, Soviet-Estonian economist and politician, people's deputy (1989–1991).
- Alastair Lamb, 93, Chinese-born British diplomatic historian and author.
- Roman Lentner, 85, Polish footballer (1960 Olympics, Górnik Zabrze).
- Aleksander Łuczak, 79, Polish historian and politician, minister of national education (1993–1995).
- Fèlix Millet, 87, Spanish businessman and convicted fraudster.
- José Elias Moreira, 82, Brazilian businessman and politician, federal deputy (1988–1995).
- Taro Nakayama, 98, Japanese politician, minister for foreign affairs (1989–1991) and MP (1968–2009).
- Petros Palian, 92, Iranian Armenian videographer and cinematographer (An Isfahani in New York, Samurai Cop, Dangerous Men).
- Mimis Papaioannou, 80, Greek football player (AEK Athens, national team) and manager (New York Pancyprian-Freedoms).
- Mary Ann Nevins Radzinowicz, 97, American academic and scholar.
- Ronald Rice, 77, American politician, member of the New Jersey Senate (1986–2022), cancer.
- Jonas Šimėnas, 69, Lithuanian politician, MP (1990–1992, 1996–2000, 2008–2012).
- Norman Steinberg, 83, American screenwriter (Blazing Saddles, My Favorite Year, Johnny Dangerously).
- John Thompson, 75, British Royal Air Force officer, head of the British Defence Staff – US (2000–2002).
- Victor Veretennikov, 82, Ukrainian politician, deputy (1990–1994, 2002–2006).
- Antje Vollmer, 79, German politician, MP (1983–1985, 1987–1990, 1994–2005).
- Thomas Wagner, 46, Austrian footballer (Mattersburg).

=== 16 ===
- Sharon Acker, 87, Canadian model and actress (Lucky Jim, Point Blank, Happy Birthday to Me).
- Katalin Benkő, 81, Hungarian Olympic sprint canoeist (1964).
- Stephen Bromhead, 66, Australian politician, New South Wales MLA (since 2011), mesothelioma.
- Sean Burns, 61–62, British overseas administrator, administrator of Tristan da Cunha (2010–2013, 2016–2020, since 2022).
- Tony Coe, 88, English jazz musician.
- Ron Elstob, 98, Australian politician, senator (1978–1987).
- Ángel Fournier, 35, Cuban Olympic rower (2008, 2012, 2016), heart attack.
- Claude Fournier, 91, Canadian film director (The Tin Flute, The Mills of Power, Alien Thunder), screenwriter and cinematographer, heart attack.
- Patrick French, 57, British writer and historian (Tibet, Tibet, The World Is What It Is), cancer.
- Sayyid Gaddaf al-Dam, 75, Libyan general.
- Jacqueline Gold, 62, British businesswoman (Ann Summers), breast cancer.
- Peter Hardy, 66, Australian actor (The Pursuit of Happiness, McLeod's Daughters, Dangerous Remedy), drowned.
- Fuzzy Haskins, 81, American Hall of Fame singer (Parliament-Funkadelic).
- Gladys Kessler, 85, American jurist, judge of the Superior Court of the District of Columbia (1977–1994) and the U.S. District Court for the District of Columbia (since 1994).
- Kenji Kosaka, 83, Japanese psychiatrist, aspiration pneumonia.
- Anna Sujatha Mathai, 89, Indian poet.
- Melanie McFadyean, 72, British journalist, cancer.
- Don Megson, 86, English football player (Sheffield Wednesday, Bristol Rovers) and manager (Portland Timbers).
- Emmanuelle Mottaz, 59, French singer and screenwriter (Hélène et les Garçons).
- Victor Ocampo, 71, Filipino Roman Catholic prelate, bishop of Gumaca (since 2015).
- Carolina Rieuwpassa, 74, Indonesian Olympic sprinter (1972, 1976).
- Franco Rotelli, 80, Italian psychiatrist.
- José Francisco Moreira dos Santos, 94, Portuguese Roman Catholic prelate, bishop of Uíje (1979–2008).
- Ray Thorburn, 85, New Zealand artist.
- Helen Vari, 91, Czechoslovak-born Canadian philanthropist.
- Brian Walsh, 67, Australian television executive (Foxtel).
- Nani Widjaja, 78, Indonesian actress (Cinta Pertama, Catatan Si Boy, Maling Kutang), respiratory failure.

=== 17 ===
- Isao Arita, 96, Japanese virologist.
- Giorgio Bornacin, 73, Italian politician, senator (1996–2001, 2006–2013) and deputy (2001–2006).
- Don Burgess, 76, Canadian ice hockey player (Philadelphia Blazers, Vancouver Blazers, San Diego Mariners).
- John Carenza, 73, American Olympic footballer (1972).
- Morville Chote, 98, British Olympic javelin thrower (1948).
- Hal Dresner, 85, American screenwriter (The Eiger Sanction, Zorro, The Gay Blade, Sssssss), cancer.
- Adri Duivesteijn, 72, Dutch politician, member of the House of Representatives (1994–2006) and Senate (2013–2015), prostate cancer.
- Jorge Edwards, 91, Chilean novelist and diplomat, ambassador to France (2010–2014).
- Sir Paul Girolami, 97, Italian-British pharmaceutical executive, chairman of Glaxo (1985–1994).
- James Goldrick, 64–65, Australian rear admiral, naval historian and analyst, lymphoma and leukaemia.
- Ada den Haan, 81, Dutch Olympic swimmer (1960), European champion (1958).
- John Jenrette, 86, American politician, member of the U.S. House of Representatives (1975–1980) and the South Carolina House of Representatives (1964–1972).
- Paffard Keatinge-Clay, 97, British architect.
- Toon Meerman, 89, Dutch footballer (Feyenoord, Excelsior). (death announced on this date)
- Pierre Michaud, 86, Canadian lawyer and judge, chief justice of Quebec (1994–2002).
- Edmar Moreira, 83, Brazilian lawyer and politician, federal deputy (1991–1995, 1999–2011, 2014).
- Jean-Bernard Ndongo Essomba, Cameroonian politician, MP (1992–1997, since 2002).
- Sean Patrick O'Brien, 34, American professional wrestling referee (OVW).
- Fito Olivares, 75, Mexican cumbia musician.
- Carlos Payán, 94, Mexican writer, journalist and politician, senator (1997–2000) and founder of La Jornada.
- Lance Reddick, 60, American actor (The Wire, Fringe, John Wick) and musician, heart disease.
- Mary Ronnie, 96, Scottish-born New Zealand librarian, national librarian (1976–1981).
- Robert W. Sennewald, 93, American army general.
- Raoul Servais, 94, Belgian filmmaker, animator, and comics artist (Harpya).
- Ray Solari, 95, American football player (California Golden Bears) and coach.
- Guy Troy, 100, American Olympic pentathlete (1952).
- Dubravka Ugrešić, 73, Croatian-Dutch writer.
- Laura Valenzuela, 92, Spanish television presenter (TVE) and actress (Spaniards in Paris, Growing Leg, Diminishing Skirt), complications from Alzheimer's disease.
- Tilman Zülch, 83, German human rights activist, founder of the Society for Threatened Peoples.

=== 18 ===
- Vladimir Chernavin, 94, Russian admiral, commander-in-chief of the navy (1985–1992), Hero of the Soviet Union.
- Robert Lindsay, 29th Earl of Crawford, 96, Scottish politician and peer, MP (1955–1974), member of the House of Lords (1974–2019) and minister of state for defence procurement (1970–1972).
- Gloria Dea, 100, American actress (King of the Congo, Plan 9 from Outer Space) and magician, coronary artery disease.
- Sir James Dunbar-Nasmith, 96, British conservation architect (Sunninghill Park, Balmoral Estate).
- Bisi Egbeyemi, 78, Nigerian lawyer and politician, deputy governor of Ekiti State (2018–2022).
- Harold Parks Helms, 87, American politician, member of the North Carolina House of Representatives (1974–1984).
- Gerhard Kraft, 81, German physicist.
- Henry O. Macauley, 61, Sierra Leonean politician, minister of energy (2014–2018).
- Kathy MacKinnon, 75, British zoologist and conservationist.
- Mozart Mimms, 104, American-Canadian trade unionist.
- Karl Nicola, 83, German politician, member of the Landtag of Baden-Württemberg (1972–1992).
- Pekka Paavola, 89, Finnish politician, minister of justice (1972).
- Joseph Powathil, 92, Indian Syro-Malabar Catholic prelate, eparch of Kanjirappally (1977–1985), auxiliary bishop (1972–1977) and archeparch (1985–2007) of Changanacherry.
- Francisco Rodón, 88, Puerto Rican painter.
- Charity Scott, 72, American legal scholar, cancer.
- Spiros Simitis, 88, Greek-German jurist and data protection pioneer.
- Valeri Sinau, 78, Russian football player (Rostov-on-Don, Zorya Luhansk) and manager (Kuban Krasnodar).
- Pedro Solbes, 80, Spanish economist, twice minister of economy and finance, European Commissioner for Economic and Monetary Affairs (1999–2004) and second deputy prime minister (2004–2009), liver cancer.
- Heinz Steinmann, 85, German footballer (Werder Bremen, Schwarz-Weiß Essen, West Germany national team).
- Steven Ungerleider, 73, American sports psychologist, author and documentary film producer (Munich '72 and Beyond, End Game, Citizen Ashe).
- Sverre Valen, 97, Norwegian choir conductor, founder of the Sandefjord Girls Choir.
- Dot Wilkinson, 101, American Hall of Fame bowler and softball player.
- Labo Yari, 80, Nigerian writer.

=== 19 ===
- Malcolm R. Barnebey, 95, American diplomat, ambassador to Belize (1981–1985).
- Roger W. Brockett, 84, American control theorist.
- Willie Cager, 80, American basketball player (Texas Western Miners).
- Elizabeth de Cuevas, 94, American sculptor.
- Katherine Fischer Drew, 99, American historian.
- Jean-Jacques Favier, 73, German-born French astronaut (STS-78).
- Clemens Ganz, 88, German organist.
- Walter Gassire, 76, Uruguayan footballer (Deportivo Toluca, Atletas Campesinos, Tampico Madero).
- Mike Kadish, 72, American football player (Buffalo Bills).
- Nelson Kiang, 93, Chinese-born American physiologist.
- Gottfried Kustermann, 79, German Olympic sport shooter (1972, 1976).
- John Linebaugh, 67, American weapons manufacturer (.500 Linebaugh, .475 Linebaugh).
- Marisol Malaret, 73, Puerto Rican television host, model, and beauty queen (Miss Universe 1970).
- Rui Nabeiro, 91, Portuguese businessman, founder of Delta Cafés.
- Petar Nadoveza, 80, Croatian football player (Hajduk Split, Yugoslavia national team) and manager (Olimpija Ljubljana).
- Emmanuel Oblitey, 89, Ghanaian Olympic footballer (1964).
- Ralph Roberts, 87, New Zealand Olympic sailor (1960, 1968).
- Csaba Schmidt, 43, Hungarian chemist and politician, MP (2010–2014) and mayor of Tatabánya (2010–2019).
- Pōhiva Tuʻiʻonetoa, 71, Tongan politician, prime minister (2019–2021), minister of finance (2018–2019) and MP (since 2014).
- Bob Wolfe, 76, American college football coach (Bowling Green Falcons, Tiffin Dragons).

=== 20 ===
- Jiayegbade Alao, allegedly 121, Nigerian musician and longevity claimant.
- Syabda Perkasa Belawa, 21, Indonesian badminton player (PB Djarum, national team), traffic collision.
- Osvaldo Cruz, 91, Argentine footballer (Independiente, Unión Española, national team).
- Ross Douglas, 72, Canadian voice actor (Mobile Suit Gundam, Master Keaton, Sly 2: Band of Thieves).
- Michael Collins Dunn, 75, American scholar.
- Dave Gardner, 70, Canadian ice hockey player (Montreal Canadiens, St. Louis Blues, California Golden Seals).
- Paul Grant, 56, British actor (Return of the Jedi, Labyrinth, The Dead) and stuntman.
- Bryn Hargreaves, 36–37, English rugby league player (Bradford Bulls, St Helens, Wigan Warriors). (body discovered on this date)
- Al Horning, 83, Canadian politician, MP (1988–1993) and British Columbia MLA (2005–2009).
- Maria Ilnicka-Mądry, 77, Polish politician, physician and academic, chair of the West Pomeranian Voivodeship Sejmik (since 2018).
- Bob Johnston, 98, Australian economist, governor of the Reserve Bank of Australia (1982–1989).
- Muhammad Sayab Khalid Khan, 82, Pakistani politician, member (1985–1996, 2001–2016) and speaker (2001–2006) of the Azad Jammu and Kashmir Legislative Assembly.
- Geof Kotila, 64, American basketball player and coach (Michigan Tech Huskies).
- Mario López Estrada, 84, Guatemalan telecommunications executive, founder of Tigo Guatemala.
- Terry Norris, 92, Australian actor (Homicide, Cop Shop) and politician, Victorian MLA (1982–1992).
- Anthony Akoto Osei, 69, Ghanaian banker and politician, minister for finance (2007–2009) and MP (since 2005).
- Eduardo Ravani, 81, Chilean comedian, cancer.
- Michael Reaves, 72, American screenwriter (Gargoyles, Batman: The Animated Series, Spider-Man Unlimited), complications from Parkinson's disease.
- Karl-Heinz Reinfandt, 90, German musicologist and music educator.
- Vasily Reshetnikov, 103, Russian pilot and World War II veteran, Hero of the Soviet Union.
- Helmut Ringsdorf, 93, German chemist.
- Viliam Roth, 81, Slovak journalist and politician, minister without portfolio of Czechoslovakia (1989).
- Abdul Rahman Majeed al-Rubaie, 83, Iraqi novelist (The Tattoo Mark).
- Val Rushworth, 83, British road and track racing cyclist. (death announced on this date)
- John Sattler, 80, Australian rugby league player (Kurri Kurri, South Sydney, national team).
- Gilly Szego, 90, British artist.
- Tewolde Berhan Gebre Egziabher, 83, Ethiopian biologist.
- Anita Thallaug, 85, Norwegian singer (Eurovision Song Contest 1963) and actress (Blonde in Bondage, I moralens navn).
- Ragab Mohamed Abu Zeid Zair, 80, Egyptian politician and lawyer, health complications in prison.
- Virginia Zeani, 97, Romanian operatic soprano.

=== 21 ===
- Charles E. Bastien, 60, Canadian animator (PAW Patrol, The Magic School Bus, Braceface), cancer.
- Willie Bell, 85, Scottish football player (Leeds United, national team) and manager (Birmingham City), stroke.
- Sir Nicholas Bonsor, 80, British politician, MP (1979–1997).
- Eric Brown, 62, British science fiction writer, sepsis.
- Alexander Cameron, 59, British barrister, pancreatic cancer.
- Yehezkel Chazom, 76, Israeli footballer (Hapoel Tel Aviv, national team).
- Fernand J. Cheri, 71, American Roman Catholic prelate, auxiliary bishop of New Orleans (since 2015).
- K. P. Dandapani, 76, Indian lawyer.
- Fred Florusse, 85, Dutch actor (Intensive Care, Wilde Harten), director and cabaret artist.
- Joe Giella, 94, American comic book artist (Batman, Green Lantern, Adam Strange).
- Janez Gorišek, 89, Slovenian civil engineer, architect, and Olympic ski jumper (1956).
- Jacques Haitkin, 72, American cinematographer (A Nightmare on Elm Street, Wishmaster, Shocker), complications from amyotrophic lateral sclerosis and leukemia.
- Hugh Hiscutt, 96, Australian politician, Tasmania MLC (1983–1995).
- Henk de Jong, 91, Dutch theologian.
- Kicking King, 25, Irish Thoroughbred racehorse.
- John Smith, Baron Kirkhill, 92, Scottish peer, lord provost of Aberdeen (1971–1975), minister of state for Scotland (1975–1978) and member of the House of Lords (1975–2018).
- Oleksandr Kozarenko, 59, Ukrainian composer, pianist and musicologist, COVID-19.
- Bill Lewellen, 71, American politician, member of the Arkansas Senate (1990–2000).
- Claude Lorius, 91, French glaciologist.
- Francesco Maselli, 92, Italian film director and screenwriter (Time of Indifference, A Tale of Love, Abandoned).
- Y. R. Meena, 76, Indian jurist, justice of the Calcutta High Court (1997–2001), Rajasthan High Court (2001–2006), and Gujarat High Court (2006–2008).
- Dan Morse, 85, American bridge player, complications from surgery.
- Jag Mohan Nath, 92, Indian Air Force officer.
- Harri Nykänen, 69, Finnish writer.
- Julie Anne Peters, 71, American novelist (Keeping You a Secret, Luna, Between Mom and Jo).
- Willis Reed, 80, American Hall of Fame basketball player (New York Knicks) and coach (New Jersey Nets), NBA champion (1970, 1973), heart failure.
- Shamim Sikder, 70, Bangladeshi sculptor (Shoparjito Shadhinota).
- Howard F. Taylor, 83, American sociologist.
- Pedro Velasco, 85, American Olympic volleyball player (1964, 1968).
- Peter Werner, 76, American film and television director (In the Region of Ice, Moonlighting, Grimm), Oscar winner (1976), heart failure.
- Kyle White, 53, Australian rugby league footballer (Canterbury-Bankstown Bulldogs, Western Suburbs Magpies).

=== 22 ===
- Rivka Basman Ben-Hayim, 98, Lithuanian-born Israeli Yiddish poet.
- Vladimir Churov, 70, Russian civil servant, chairman of the Central Election Commission (2007–2016), heart attack.
- Jirō Dan, 74, Japanese actor (Daijōbu, My Friend, Return of Ultraman, Zero Woman), lung cancer.
- John Ene, 52, Romanian football player (Brașov, Dunărea Giurgiu) and manager, heart attack.
- Rafael Filippelli, 84, Argentine film director, producer and screenwriter (The Absentee).
- Marie-Thérèse Join-Lambert, 86, French government official, president of ONPES (1999–2005).
- Rebecca Jones, 65, Mexican-American actress (Imperio de cristal, Para volver a amar, Que te perdone Dios), ovarian cancer.
- Salim Khatri, 58, Pakistani religious leader, shot.
- Tony Knapp, 86, English football player (Southampton) and manager (Viking, Iceland national team).
- Rigmor Kofoed-Larsen, 79, Norwegian politician, MP (1997–2001).
- Jackie Lane, 91, English footballer (Notts County, Birmingham City).
- Tom Leadon, 70, American musician (Mudcrutch).
- Thomas P. Lowry, 90, American author.
- Takafumi Matsui, 77, Japanese planetary scientist, prostate cancer.
- Arthur L. Peterson, 96, American educator and politician, member of the Montana House of Representatives (2000–2002).
- Lucy Salani, 98, Italian activist.
- Ahmad Samii Gilani, 102, Iranian translator and editor.
- Teresa Sempere Jaén, 75, Spanish politician, deputy (1989–1996).
- Ben Shelly, 75, American politician, president of the Navajo Nation (2011–2015).
- Vera T. Sós, 92, Hungarian mathematician (Kővári–Sós–Turán theorem), member of the Hungarian Academy of Sciences.
- Marcus Wilson, 91, Irish Gaelic footballer (St Vincents, Dublin).
- Andrzej Zarębski, 65, Polish politician and journalist, MP (1991–1993) and member of KRRiT (1993–1997).

=== 23 ===
- Tony Abbott, 92, Canadian politician, MP (1974–1979), minister of consumer and corporate affairs (1976–1977) and of national revenue (1978–1979).
- Jean-Marie Apostolidès, 79, French novelist, essayist, and theater director.
- Souhila Belbahar, 89, Algerian painter.
- Abhay Chhajlani, 88, Indian journalist.
- K. C. Constantine, 88, American author.
- Darcelle XV, 92, American drag queen.
- Sir Howard Fergus, 85, Montserratian author and historian.
- Marion Game, 84, Moroccan-born French actress (Scènes de ménages, Parking, Dickie-roi).
- Epeli Ganilau, 71, Fijian military officer and politician, minister for Fijian affairs (2007–2008) and chairman of the Great Council of Chiefs (2001–2004).
- Jerry Green, 94, American Hall of Fame sportswriter (Associated Press, The Detroit News).
- James Harithas, 90, American museum curator.
- Huang Baosheng, 80, Chinese Sanskrit scholar.
- Dafydd Hywel, 77, Welsh actor (Coming Up Roses, Off to Philadelphia in the Morning, Miss Peregrine's Home for Peculiar Children).
- Joseph R. Inge, 75, American lieutenant general.
- Toichiro Kinoshita, 98, Japanese-born American theoretical physicist.
- Rita Lakin, 93, American television writer (Peyton Place, The Doctors, The Rookies).
- Frank LeMaster, 71, American football player (Philadelphia Eagles).
- Peter Marti, 70, Swiss footballer (Zürich, Basel, national team).
- Tomoko Naraoka, 93, Japanese actress (Poppoya, Ponyo, Wolf), pneumonia.
- Harald Neuwirth, 84, Austrian jazz pianist and composer.
- Letitia Obeng, 98, Ghanaian educational pioneer.
- Brendan O'Brien, 60, American voice actor (Crash Bandicoot).
- Rolando Picchioni, 86, Italian politician, deputy (1972–1983) and undersecretary for cultural heritage (1979–1981).
- Tommy Proffitt, 95, English Olympic boxer (1948).
- Keith Reid, 76, English lyricist (Procol Harum) and songwriter ("A Whiter Shade of Pale", "You're the Voice"), colon cancer.
- Peter Shelley, 80, British songwriter ("My Coo Ca Choo"), singer, and record producer (Magnet Records).
- Horst Söhnlein, 80, German activist.
- Israel Zelitch, 98, American plant pathologist and ecologist, COVID-19.

=== 24 ===
- Takashi Awamori, 84, Japanese businessman and politician, councillor (1989–1995).
- Marcel Blanc, 88, Swiss politician, Vaud state councillor (1978–1991).
- Martin T. Buell, 80, American karateka.
- William D. Coleman, 72, Canadian political scientist.
- Scott Johnson, 70, American composer, pneumonia.
- Tim Joiner, 62, American football player (Houston Oilers, Denver Broncos).
- Orhan Karaveli, 93, Turkish journalist and writer.
- Walter Kintsch, 90, American psychologist and academic.
- Marie Laing, 85, Canadian politician, Alberta MLA (1986–1993).
- Jeremy Lemmon, 87, British educator.
- Arley McNeney, 40, Canadian wheelchair basketball player, Paralympic bronze medallist (2004).
- Gordon Moore, 94, American businessman, engineer (Moore's law), and philanthropist, co-founder of Intel and Gordon and Betty Moore Foundation.
- Yakov Neishtadt, 99, Russian-Israeli chess player and author.
- One For Arthur, 14, Irish Thoroughbred racehorse.
- Marko Petkovšek, 67, Slovenian mathematician.
- Randall Robinson, 81, American lawyer, author, and activist.
- Pradeep Sarkar, 67, Indian film director (Parineeta, Laaga Chunari Mein Daag, Helicopter Eela) and producer.
- David Schoumacher, 88, American news anchor and journalist.
- Mel Semenko, 85, American football player (BC Lions, Ottawa Rough Riders, Montreal Alouettes).
- Bruce Sinclair, 94, Canadian politician, mayor of Etobicoke (1984–1994).

=== 25 ===
- W. Onico Barker, 88, American politician, member of the Virginia Senate (1980–1992).
- Steve Booras, 74, American gridiron football player (Las Vegas Cowboys, Montreal Alouettes, Memphis Southmen), natural causes.
- Chabelo, 88, American-born Mexican actor (The Extra, Escuela para solteras) and comedian (La Carabina de Ambrosio), sepsis.
- Juca Chaves, 84, Brazilian singer and comedian, respiratory failure.
- Daniel Chorzempa, 78, American organist and composer.
- Csaba Czakó, 79, Hungarian Olympic rower (1972).
- Rita Czech-Blasl, 90, German Olympic cross-country skier (1956, 1960, 1964).
- Hennie Dompeling, 56, Dutch five-time Olympic sport shooter.
- Ger Glavin, 66, Irish Gaelic footballer (Midleton, Ballincollig, Cork) and hurler.
- Barry Goldberg, 61, American volleyball coach (American University), cancer.
- Christopher Gunning, 78, English composer (La Vie en rose, Agatha Christie's Poirot, Middlemarch), kidney cancer.
- Edwin J. Hess, 89, American businessman.
- Muhammad Idrees, Pakistani politician, Khyber Pakhtunkhwa MPA (2013–2018).
- Pavel Krotov, 30, Russian Olympic freestyle skier (2014, 2018).
- Mitsuo Kurotsuchi, 76, Japanese director and screenwriter (The Samurai I Loved), multiple organ failure.
- Jean Lacy, 90, American museum education specialist and visual artist.
- Sassi Lamouri, 83, Algerian politician, minister of religious affairs and wakfs (1992–1993, 1994–1995).
- Reginald Wyndham Lloyd-Davies, 88, British urologist (A Colour Atlas of Urology), metastatic pancreatic cancer.
- Byron J. Matthews, 94, American politician, mayor of Newburyport, Massachusetts (1968–1978).
- Pascoal Mocumbi, 81, Mozambican politician, prime minister (1994–2004).
- Moosa Moolla, 88, South African activist and diplomat, ambassador to Iran (1995–1999), high commissioner to Pakistan (2000–2004).
- Hans Richter, 63, German footballer (Karl-Marx-Stadt, Lokomotive Leipzig, East Germany national team).
- Erwin Riess, 66, Austrian political scientist, playwright and journalist.
- Janine Shalom, 63, British theatre publicist.
- Leo D. Sullivan, 82, American animator (Jabberjaw, BraveStarr, Taz-Mania).
- Tristán, 86, Argentine actor (Historia de un clan, La Casa de Madame Lulù, Los caballeros de la cama redonda) and comedian, double pneumonia.
- Lucinda Urrusti, 94, Spanish-born Mexican artist.
- Henk Visser, 92, Dutch pediatrician and professor.
- Nick Lloyd Webber, 43, English composer (Love, Lies and Records, Fat Friends The Musical, The Last Bus) and record producer, gastric cancer.
- Yang Bing-yi, 96, Taiwanese businessman, founder of Din Tai Fung.

=== 26 ===
- Rudolf Atamalyan, 76, Russian football player (Lokomotiv Moscow, Nistru Chișinău) and manager (Irtysh Tobolsk).
- Dan Ben-Amos, 88, American folklorist and professor.
- Zvi Dershowitz, 94, Czech-born American rabbi.
- Oladipo Diya, 78, Nigerian military officer, chief of general staff (1993–1997) and governor of Ogun State (1984–1985).
- Nikolay Dupak, 101, Russian actor (The Forty-First, Intervention, Bumbarash).
- Köksal Engür, 77, Turkish actor (Whisper If I Forget, Leyla and Mecnun, Mommy, I'm Scared), kidney failure.
- Ron Faber, 90, American actor (The Exorcist, Navy SEALs, The Private Files of J. Edgar Hoover), lung cancer.
- Ousmane Farota, 58, Malian footballer (Stade Malien, national team).
- Innocent, 75, Indian actor (Mazhavilkavadi, Ponmuttayidunna Tharavu) and politician, MP (2014–2019).
- María Kodama, 86, Argentine writer, breast cancer.
- Rick Lantz, 85, American football coach (Georgia Tech, Navy Midshipmen, Berlin Thunder).
- Ronnie Lee, 66, American football player (Miami Dolphins, Seattle Seahawks, Atlanta Falcons).
- Peter Mak, 66, Hong Kong film director (The Wicked City) and actor (Happy Sixteen, Lai Shi, China's Last Eunuch).
- Ivano Marescotti, 77, Italian actor (King Arthur, The Talented Mr. Ripley, Hannibal) and theater director.
- David Christopher McGough, 78, English Roman Catholic prelate, auxiliary bishop of Birmingham (2005–2020).
- John Mengatti, 68, American actor (The White Shadow, Meatballs Part II, Dead Men Don't Die).
- Juan Carlos Murúa, 87, Argentine football player (Platense, national team) and manager (Gimnasia La Plata).
- Virginia Norwood, 96, American physicist.
- Thomas J. Osler, 82, American mathematician, long-distance runner and author.
- Ray Pillow, 85, American country singer ("I'll Take the Dog").
- Abdelwahed Radi, 88, Moroccan politician, president of the House of Representatives (1997–2007, 2010–2011) and minister of justice (2007–2010).
- Karl-Josef Rauber, 88, German Roman Catholic cardinal, apostolic pro-nuncio to Uganda (1982–1990), president of the PEA (1990–1993) and apostolic nuncio to Hungary (1997–2003).
- Wolfgang Schivelbusch, 81, German historian.
- Paul Schmidt, 37, Canadian restaurant patron, stabbed.
- Claudia Schüler, 35, Chilean field hockey player (national team), liver cancer.
- Jaime Tadeo, 84, Filipino peasant and organic farming activist.
- D. M. Thomas, 88, British poet, translator and novelist (The Flute-Player, The White Hotel).
- Emahoy Tsegué-Maryam Guèbrou, 99, Ethiopian nun, pianist and composer.
- Bill Zehme, 64, American writer and journalist, colorectal cancer.
- Jacob Ziv, 91, Israeli computer scientist (LZ77 and LZ78).

=== 27 ===
- Philip Basoah, 53, Ghanaian politician, MP (since 2021).
- Wim de Bie, 83, Dutch comedian (Van Kooten en De Bie), writer, and singer.
- James Bowman, 81, English countertenor.
- Nick Galifianakis, 94, American politician, member of the U.S. House of Representatives (1967–1973) and the North Carolina House of Representatives (1961–1967).
- Max Hardcore, 66, American pornographic actor, pneumonia.
- Sir David Harrison, 92, English chemist and academic administrator, vice-chancellor of Keele University (1979–1984) and the University of Exeter (1984–1994).
- Tauno Honkanen, 95, Finnish Olympic skier (1948).
- Charles Hough Jr., 88, American equestrian, Olympic bronze medallist (1952).
- Howie Kane, 81, American pop singer (Jay and the Americans). (death announced on this date)
- Carol Lavell, 79, American equestrian, Olympic bronze medallist (1992).
- Gianguido Milanesi, 88, Italian Olympic fencer.
- Gianni Minà, 84, Italian journalist (RAI) and writer, heart disease.
- Jocelyn Morlock, 53, Canadian composer.
- Ronald A. Sarasin, 88, American politician, member of the U.S. House of Representatives (1973–1979) and the Connecticut House of Representatives (1969–1973).
- Peggy Scott-Adams, 74, American blues and R&B singer.

=== 28 ===
- Maria Rosa Antognazza, 58, Italian-British philosopher.
- Ted CoConis, 95, American illustrator (Summer of the Swans) and painter.
- Theodor Otto Diener, 102, Swiss-American plant pathologist, discoverer of viroids.
- Blas Durán, 73, Dominican bachata singer.
- Ernesto García Seijas, 81, Argentine comics artist.
- Jimmy Gray, 93, Irish Gaelic footballer and hurler (Na Fianna, Dublin).
- Arthur Hammond, 92–93, Canadian filmmaker and director (Corporation).
- Kulow Maalim Hassan, Kenyan politician, MP (since 2017), traffic collision.
- Mel King, 94, American politician, member of the Massachusetts House of Representatives (1973–1983).
- E. James Ladwig, 84, American politician.
- Bill Leavy, 76, American football official.
- Nathaly López Borja, 35, Ecuadorian activist and hospital administrator, shot.
- Mardye McDole, 63, American football player (Minnesota Vikings).
- Derek Meyers, 45, Canadian politician, Saskatchewan MLA (since 2020), cancer.
- Sanath Nandasiri, 81, Sri Lankan singer, musician and composer.
- Paul O'Grady, 67, English comedian, drag queen, and television presenter (Blankety Blank, The Paul O'Grady Show, Paul O'Grady: For the Love of Dogs), cardiac arrhythmia.
- Norris W. Overton, 97, American brigadier general.
- Alan W. Partin, 62, American prostate surgeon.
- Joseph Michael Perera, 81, Sri Lankan politician, minister of home affairs (2015), member (since 1976) and speaker (2001–2004) of the Parliament.
- Ludwig A. Rehlinger, 95, German jurist.
- Jerzy Rzedowski, 96, Polish-born Mexican botanist.
- Ryuichi Sakamoto, 71, Japanese musician (Yellow Magic Orchestra) and film composer (The Last Emperor, The Revenant), Oscar winner (1988), rectal cancer.
- Bill Saluga, 85, American comedian.
- Manfred Schaefer, 80, German-born Australian football player (St. George-Budapest, Australia national team) and manager (Sydney Olympic).
- Margot Stern Strom, 81, American teacher, co-founder of Facing History and Ourselves.
- Margareta Strömstedt, 91, Swedish author, journalist (Dagens Nyheter) and translator.
- Sun Yumin, 83, Chinese Peking opera artist, multiple organ failure.

=== 29 ===
- Girish Bapat, 72, Indian politician, MP (since 2019) and Maharashtra MLA (1995–2019).
- Helen Barolini, 97, American writer (Umbertina), editor, and translator.
- Joan Wadleigh Curran, 72, American visual artist, complications from metastatic cancer.
- Albina Deriugina, 91, Ukrainian rhythmic gymnastics coach.
- Anthony H. Gair, 74, American attorney.
- David W. Hoyle, 84, American politician, member of the North Carolina Senate (1993–2010).
- Arastun Javadov, 74, Azerbaijani politician, MP (2005–2015).
- Henry L. Joy, 89, American politician, member of the Maine House of Representatives (2002–2010).
- John Kerin, 85, Australian politician, twice MP, minister for transport (1991) and trade (1991–1993).
- Hedda Kleinfeld Schachter, 99, Austrian-born American wedding dress designer, co-founder of Kleinfeld Bridal.
- Horst Milde, 89, German politician, president of the Landtag of Lower Saxony (1990–1998).
- Jennifer Muller, 78, American choreographer.
- Yerra Narayanaswamy, 91, Indian politician, MP (1994–1999).
- Vadim Oyun, 79, Russian politician, member of the Soviet of Nationalities (1984–1989).
- Angela Perez, 55, Filipino actress, stroke.
- Dragomir R. Radev, 54, American computer scientist.
- Gilmara Sanches, 79, Brazilian actress (Betão Ronca Ferro), dubbing artist and director.
- Sweet Charles Sherrell, 80, American bassist (James Brown, The J.B.'s).
- Nur-e-Alam Siddique, 82, Bangladeshi politician, MP (1973–1976).
- Vivan Sundaram, 79, Indian artist, complications from a brain hemorrhage.
- Myriam Ullens, 70, German-born Belgian entrepreneur, shot.
- Stewart West, 88, Australian politician, MP (1977–1983), minister for housing (1984–1987) and administrative services (1987–1990).
- David Willicombe, 72, Welsh rugby league player (Halifax Panthers, Wigan Warriors, national team).
- Tommy Wilson, 85, English cricket umpire.
- Frederick F. Woerner Jr., 89, American general.

=== 30 ===
- John Allore, 59, Canadian-American actor (Trapped in Paradise), writer and podcaster, traffic collision.
- Leandro Becheroni, 72, Italian motorcycle racer, heart attack.
- Michael Berlyn, 73, American video game designer (Tass Times in Tonetown, Bubsy in Claws Encounters of the Furred Kind) and writer.
- Ron Blain, 82, Australian rules footballer (Footscray).
- Sujan Singh Bundela, 76, Indian politician, MP (1984–1989, 1999–2004).
- Roger Lindsay, Baron of Craighall, 81–82, Canadian accountant.
- Laura Gómez-Lacueva, 48, Spanish actress (Chrysalis, Uncertain Glory, The Realm), cancer.
- Fred Klages, 79, American baseball player (Chicago White Sox).
- Johan Leysen, 73, Belgian actor (The Abyss, Brotherhood of the Wolf, The American).
- Rolf Maier, 86, French Olympic weightlifter (1960, 1964, 1968).
- Doug Mulray, 71, Australian radio broadcaster (Triple J, Triple M Sydney, 2WS), liver cancer.
- Elemér Ragályi, 83, Hungarian cinematographer (The Phantom of the Opera, Mesmer, An American Rhapsody), film director and actor.
- Michael Rudman, 84, American theatre director.
- Mark Russell, 90, American political satirist and comedian, prostate cancer.
- Mate Šestan, 52, Croatian footballer (Copenhagen, Levante, Marsonia).
- Ray Shulman, 73, English musician (Gentle Giant) and record producer (Reading, Writing and Arithmetic, Life's Too Good).
- Steve Skeates, 80, American comic book writer (Aquaman, Hawk and Dove, Phantom Stranger).
- Bill Slocum, 75, American politician, member of the Pennsylvania State Senate (1997–2000).
- Paweł Śpiewak, 71, Polish sociologist, historian, and politician, deputy (2005–2007).
- Dan Stannard, 85, Zimbabwean policeman and cricket administrator.
- Peter Usborne, 85, British publisher, founder of Usborne Publishing.
- Meir Wieseltier, 82, Israeli poet and translator.

=== 31 ===
- Philip Balsam, 79, Canadian songwriter (Fraggle Rock).
- Ada Bello, 89, Cuban-American LGBT rights activist, co-founder of the Homophile Action League, COVID-19 and pneumonia.
- John Brockington, 74, American football player (Green Bay Packers, Kansas City Chiefs).
- Albert M. Calland III, 70, American Navy SEAL, deputy director of the CIA (2005–2006).
- Harry Cassidy, 92, Northern Irish Gaelic footballer (Bellaghy, Derry).
- Brigette Dacko, 79, Central African first lady (1962–1966, 1979–1981).
- Gene Derricotte, 96, American football player (Michigan Wolverines).
- Palmério Dória, 74, Brazilian journalist and writer, sepsis.
- Joe Falzon, 90, Maltese strongman.
- Bruce A. Fuhrer, 91, Australian botanist and photographer.
- John S. Greenspan, 85, British-born American dental and HIV researcher.
- David W. Hafemeister, 88, American physicist.
- Raghavan Iyer, 61, Indian-born American chef and author, colorectal cancer.
- Christo Jivkov, 48, Bulgarian actor (The Passion of the Christ, The Profession of Arms, Barbarossa), lung cancer.
- Irina Kostyuchenkova, 61, Ukrainian Olympic javelin thrower (1988, 1992).
- Asja Łamtiugina, 82, Polish actress (The Scar, Pan Tadeusz, Boys Don't Cry).
- Jack Lumsden, 93, Australian rugby league footballer (Manly Warringah Sea Eagles, national team).
- Mercia MacDermott, 95, English writer and historian.
- Ossama bin Abdul Majed Shobokshi, 79, Saudi Arabian diplomat and politician, minister of health (1995–2003).
- Antonio Martorell Lacave, 62, Spanish military officer, chief of staff of the Navy (since 2021), cancer.
- Vitaly Merinov, 32, Ukrainian kickboxer.
- George Nagobads, 101, Latvian-born American ice hockey team physician (United States national team, Minnesota Golden Gophers).
- Sir Rabbie Namaliu, 75, Papua New Guinean politician, prime minister (1988–1992), heart attack.
- Mimí Panayotti, 85, Honduran writer and journalist (La Prensa).
- Stanislav Párnický, 77, Slovak film director.
- Ricochet, 15, American Golden Retriever surfing dog, liver cancer.
- Viktor Scholz, 88, Russian-born German classical organist.
- Sarah Thomas, 88, Indian novelist.
- Sandipan Thorat, 90, Indian politician, MP (1977–1999).
- Boris Ulianich, 98, Italian politician, senator (1979–1992).
- Milena Usenik, 88, Slovenian Olympic shot putter (1956, 1960).
- Wan Haifeng, 102, Chinese military officer, political commissioner of the Chengdu Military Region (1982–1990) and deputy (1978–1983, 1988–1993).
