= Israel Zelitch =

American plant physiologist (1924–2023)

- Born: June 18, 1924; Philadelphia, Pennsylvania, U.S.
- Died: March 22, 2023 (aged 98); Haverhill, Massachusetts, U.S.
- Education: Pennsylvania State University; University of Wisconsin–Madison; New York University School of Medicine
- Scientific career
- Fields: Plant physiologyy

Israel Zelitch (June 18, 1924 – March 23, 2023) was an American plant physiologist specialising in photosynthesis at the Connecticut Agricultural Experiment Station and an Elected Fellow of the American Association for the Advancement of Science and American Academy of Arts and Sciences.

== Biography ==
Zelitch was born in Philadelphia, Pennsylvania, on June 18, 1924. He died of COVID-19 in Haverhill, Massachusetts, on March 23, 2023, at the age of 98.

== Education ==
- B.S. Agricultural and Biological Chemistry, Pennsylvania State University, 1947
- Ph.D, Biochemistry, University of Wisconsin, 1951
- National Research Council Postdoctoral Fellow, NYU College of Medicine, 1951–1952
