= Bryan Horskins =

Australian rules footballer

Personal information
- Full name: Bryan Julius Horskins
- Born: 25 October 1945
- Died: 9 March 2023 (aged 77)
- Height: 183 cm (6 ft 0 in)
- Weight: 83 kg (183 lb)

Playing career^{1}
Years	Club	Games (Goals)
1965	Hawthorn	8 (4)
- ^{1} Playing statistics correct to the end of 1965.

Bryan Julius Horskins (25 October 1945 – 9 March 2023) was an Australian rules footballer who played with Hawthorn in the Victorian Football League (VFL).
