= David W. Hafemeister =

American physicist

- Born: Daryl Walter Hafemeister; July 1, 1934; Milwaukee, Wisconsin, U.S.
- Died: March 31, 2023 (aged 88); San Luis Obispo, California, U.S.
- Education: Northwestern University; University of Illinois Urbana-Champaign
- Occupation: Physicist

David Walter Hafemeister (July 1, 1934 – March 31, 2023) was an American physicist.

== Life and career ==
Hafemeister was born in Milwaukee, Wisconsin, the son of Lester and Alma Hafemeister. He attended Northwestern University, earning his BS degree in mechanical engineering in 1957. He also attended the University of Illinois Urbana-Champaign, earning his MS degree in 1960 and his PhD degree in physics in 1964.

Hafemeister served as a professor in the department of physics at California Polytechnic State University, San Luis Obispo from 1972 to 2000. During his years as a professor, from 1975 to 1977, he worked as a science advisor in the United States Senate, and in 1988, he was named a fellow of the American Physical Society, "for continuing contributions to the analysis of science and society issues relating to energy and the nuclear arms race".

== Death ==
Hafemeister died in San Luis Obispo, California on March 31, 2023, at the age of 88.
