= Ryuzan Aki =

Japanese manga artist (1942–2023)

- 秋竜山
- Born: Yoshifumi Aki; 13 March 1942; Itō, Shizuoka Prefecture, Empire of Japan
- Died: 6 March 2023 (aged 80); Sagamihara, Kanagawa Prefecture, Japan
- Other name: Ryuzan Akiyama
- Occupation: Mangaka

Yoshifumi Aki (Japanese: 秋 好文, 13 March 1942 – 6 March 2023), best known under the pen name Ryuzan Aki (Japanese: 秋竜山), was a Japanese manga artist and writer.

== Life and career ==
Born in Itō, Shizuoka into a family of fishermen, Aki worked as fisherman and later as a post office clerk while collaborating part-time as a manga artist with various publications. He decided to become a full-time professional manga artist after one of his works was published on Weekly Manga Times, and in 1966 he left the post office and moved to Tokyo to devote himself fully to his profession.

Specialized in nonsense gag cartoons, during his career Aki received numerous awards, notably two Shogakukan Manga Awards, in 1971 for his series Gag Ojisan and Oya Baka Tengoku and in 1975 for Oh☆Jarry's!, and the Japan Cartoonists Association Award Grand Prize in 2006 for Akiryuuzan Tsushin. He also received a lifetime Minister of Education, Culture, Sports, Science and Technology Award for his career. Diagnosed with pneumonia, he died of heart attack on 6 March 2023, at the age of 80.
