= Ragab Mohamed Abu Zeid Zair =

Egyptian politician (c.1943–2023)

Ragab Mohamed Abu Zeid Zair (c. 1943 – March 20, 2023) was an Egyptian politician and lawyer.

== Biography ==
Born c. 1943, Zair was elected to the first Parliament of Egypt following the 2011 Egyptian revolution. He was among the thousands arrested following the 2013 Egyptian coup d'état, and was held at al-Qanater men's prison.

He was arrested again in October 2021, and was held at Wadi el-Natrun Prison. His family requested his release in February 2022, due to medical concerns, which included diabetes and bronchitis. He died on March 20, 2023, aged 80, and was the eighth Egyptian political prisoner to die in prison in 2023.
