= Jan Syczewski =

Polish teacher and politician (1937–2023)

Member of the Sejm
- In office 20 October 1997 – 18 October 2001

Personal details
- Born: 26 March 1937 Stryki, Białystok Voivodeship, Poland
- Died: 9 March 2023 (aged 85)
- Party: SLD
- Education: University of Gdańsk
- Occupation: Teacher

Jan Syczewski (Belarusian: Ян Сычэўскі; 26 March 1937 – 9 March 2023) was a Polish teacher and politician of the Belarusian minority. A member of the Democratic Left Alliance, he served in the Sejm from 1997 to 2001.

Syczewski died on 9 March 2023, at the age of 85.
