= Fernando Valdés Dal-Ré =

Spanish politician (1945–2023)

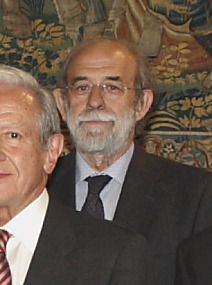
Valdés in 2013

Fernando Valdés Dal-Ré (22 April 1945 – 9 March 2023) was a Spanish jurist, labour inspector and professor of labour law. He was the Solicitor General of Spain from 1986 to 1990 and a magistrate of the Constitutional Court of Spain from 2012 to 2020.

== Biography ==
Born in Valladolid on 22 April 1945, Valdés completed a doctorate in law at the Complutense University of Madrid (UCM). He taught at the University of Salamanca (1977–1978) and the University of Valladolid (UVA; 1978–1991), then at UCM until his retirement. He was also an associate professor at the Paris Nanterre University (1986–2012) and Lumière University Lyon 2 (2005–2012) in France. He received an honorary doctorate from the UVA in 2015.

Valdés was a labour inspector from 1968 to 1974, and a clerk at the Constitutional Court of Spain (TC) from 1983 to 1985, and the Solicitor General of Spain from 1986 to 1990. He was a member of the first legislature of the Cortes of Castile and León, elected in 1983.

In July 2012, on the initiative of the Spanish Socialist Workers' Party (PSOE), Valdés was elected as a magistrate of the TC by the Congress of Deputies.

Valdés was arrested for allegedly assaulting his wife of 53 years in their Majadahonda home; she denied the allegations. The case was investigated by the Supreme Court of Spain. On 14 October 2020, while maintaining his innocence, Valdés resigned in order to protect the reputation of the Constitutional Court and to prepare for any upcoming trial; the jurisdiction of the case was transferred back to the local court. Prosecutors requested a ten-month prison sentence for Valdés in March 2021. The case was dropped in July 2022, as he was deemed unfit to testify due to his dementia.

Valdés died on 9 March 2023, at the age of 77.
