= Warren Saunders =

Australian cricketer (1934–2023)

Personal information
- Full name: Warren Joseph Saunders
- Born: 18 July 1934; Arncliffe, New South Wales, Australia
- Died: 1 March 2023 (aged 88); New South Wales, Australia
- Batting: Right-handed
- Role: Batsman, occasional wicket-keeper

Domestic team information
- Years: Team
- 1955/56–1964/65: New South Wales

Career statistics
Competition	First-class
Matches	35
Runs scored	1,701
Batting average	32.71
100s/50s	0/11
Top score	98
Balls bowled	16
Wickets	0
Bowling average	–
5 wickets in innings	–
10 wickets in match	–
Best bowling	–
Catches/stumpings	19/1
- Source: ESPNcricinfo, 9 October 2021

Warren Joseph Saunders (18 July 1934 – 1 March 2023) was an Australian cricketer. A batsman and occasional wicket-keeper, he played 35 first-class matches for New South Wales between 1955–56 and 1964–65.

Although Saunders was a consistent scorer for New South Wales, he never scored a century. In January 1964, he top-scored in both innings against Victoria, making 87 and 98. He retired from first-class cricket during the 1964–65 season to concentrate on his insurance business. However, he continued to play for St George in Sydney Grade Cricket, reaching 10,000 runs for the club in 1971–72.

Saunders died on 1 March 2023, at the age of 88.
