= Takafumi Matsui =

Japanese planetary scientist and geophysicist (1946–2023)

- 松井孝典
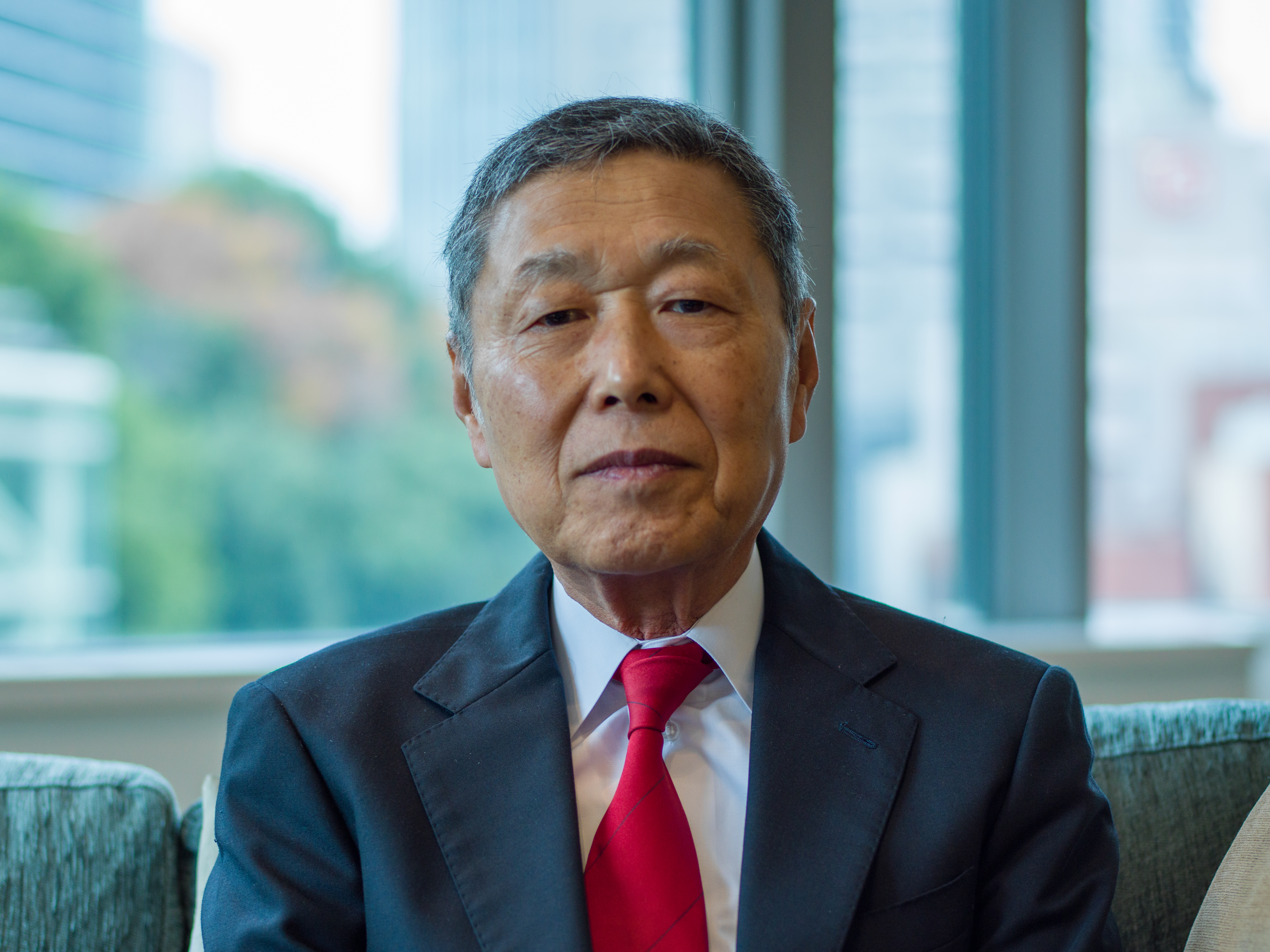
- Matsui in 2021
- Born: 7 March 1946; Shizuoka, Japan
- Died: 22 March 2023 (aged 77)
- Other names: Takanori Matsui
- Occupation: Scientist

Takafumi Matsui (Japanese: 松井孝典, 7 March 1946 – 22 March 2023) was a Japanese planetary scientist, geophysicist, science communicator and academic. He was professor emeritus at the University of Tokyo.

== Life and career ==
Born in Shizuoka, Matsui graduated from the Faculty of Science of the University of Tokyo, and after a stage as a visiting researcher at NASA he became professor at the Graduate School of Frontier Sciences of his alma mater. He was specialized in astrobiology and comparative planetary science. He served as president of the Chiba Institute of Technology from June 2020 till his death. He authored numerous scientific articles and books.

Matsui died of prostate cancer on 22 March 2023, at the age of 77. The planet 7301 Matsuitakafumi, discovered in 1993, was named after him.
