= Andrzej Zarębski =

Polish politician (1957–2023)

Member of the Sejm
- In office 25 November 1991 – 31 May 1993
- Constituency: Constituency No. 14

Personal details
- Born: Andrzej Mirosław Zarębski; 7 July 1957 Gdynia, Poland
- Died: 22 March 2023 (aged 65)
- Party: KLD
- Education: University of Gdańsk
- Occupation: Entrepreneur

Andrzej Mirosław Zarębski (7 July 1957 – 22 March 2023) was a Polish entrepreneur and politician. A member of the Liberal Democratic Congress, he served in the Sejm from 1991 to 1993.

Zarębski died on 22 March 2023, at the age of 65.
