= Hedda Kleinfeld Schachter =

American bridal industry executive (1924–2023)

- Born: Hedda Kleinfeld; February 5, 1924; Vienna, Austria
- Died: March 29, 2023 (aged 99); New York City, US
- Other name: Miss Hedda
- Known for: Impact on the bridal industry as a proprietor of I. Kleinfeld & Son

Hedda Kleinfeld Schachter (February 5, 1924 – March 29, 2023) was a Vienna-born American entrepreneur. Described as a "doyenne of bridal couture", she and her husband built her family's small fur business into I. Kleinfeld & Son, which became the largest bridal retailer in the United States.

== Early life ==
Kleinfeld was born in Vienna. A Holocaust survivor, she and her family fled Austria after her father's fur business was seized by the Nazis in 1938. They lived in Cuba until they received US visas and in 1940 moved to Bay Ridge in Brooklyn, New York.

== Career ==
Kleinfeld was established by Kleinfeld, her father and her husband, Jack Schachter, in 1941. With an initial investment of $600, the store carried fur and special occasion dresses. She introduced European bridal attire in 1968, and subsequently convinced prominent American clothing designers to produce wedding dresses. She negotiated exclusive retail rights for Kleinfeld with Carolina Herrera, Arnold Scaasi, Galina, House of Bianchi, Ilissa and Priscilla of Boston, among other labels. In 1979 Kleinfeld carried more than 400 styles of gowns.

Kleinfeld and her husband sold the business in 1990; by then it had expanded to a 30,000-square-foot superstore in Bay Ridge and a 4,000-square-foot bridesmaids’ store on Third Avenue in Manhattan. A multi-million dollar business, prices for gowns ranged from $2,000 to $20,000. The reality show Say Yes to the Dress began shooting at Kleinfeld in 2005. Women's Wear Daily reported that the location was chosen based on "Kleinfeld’s reputation as a bridal authority, which Hedda Schachter had solidified decades before."

Kleinfeld died in Manhattan on March 29, 2023. She was 99.
