= Colin Wilcockson =

British medievalist and literary scholar (1932–2023)

Colin Wilcockson (23 July 1932 – 1 March 2023) was a British medievalist and literary scholar.

== Biography ==
Born in Leytonstone and raised in Loughton, Essex, Wilcockson attended Chigwell School, where he was head boy and later served as a governor. He studied English as a choral exhibitioner at Merton College, Oxford. After narrowly missing a first-class degree, he pursued a Diploma in Education rather than doctoral studies. During his teaching training at Harrow, he befriended the poet and artist David Jones, whose works became one of Wilcockson's scholarly interests. His correspondence with Jones forms an important archival resource at Pembroke College, Cambridge.

Wilcockson taught initially at Campbell College, Belfast, before becoming head of English at The Leys School in Cambridge in 1959. There he notably influenced the writer Christopher Hitchens, who acknowledged Wilcockson in his memoir, Hitch-22.

In 1973, Wilcockson joined Pembroke College, Cambridge, as a fellow, where he served as Director of Studies in English and Anglo-Saxon, Norse and Celtic literature. His academic contributions included scholarly editions of medieval works such as William Langland's Piers Plowman, Geoffrey Chaucer's The Book of the Duchess (in The Riverside Chaucer), and a selection of The Canterbury Tales for Penguin Classics.

Wilcockson was a three-time recipient of Cambridge University's Seatonian Prize, awarded for poetry on sacred subjects. He participated actively in outreach efforts aimed at broadening university access and supported Pembroke College's transition to co-education during the 1980s.

In later years, Wilcockson taught courses in Cologne, Ghana, and at Pembroke College summer schools.
