= Erwin Riess =

Austrian writer (1957–2023)

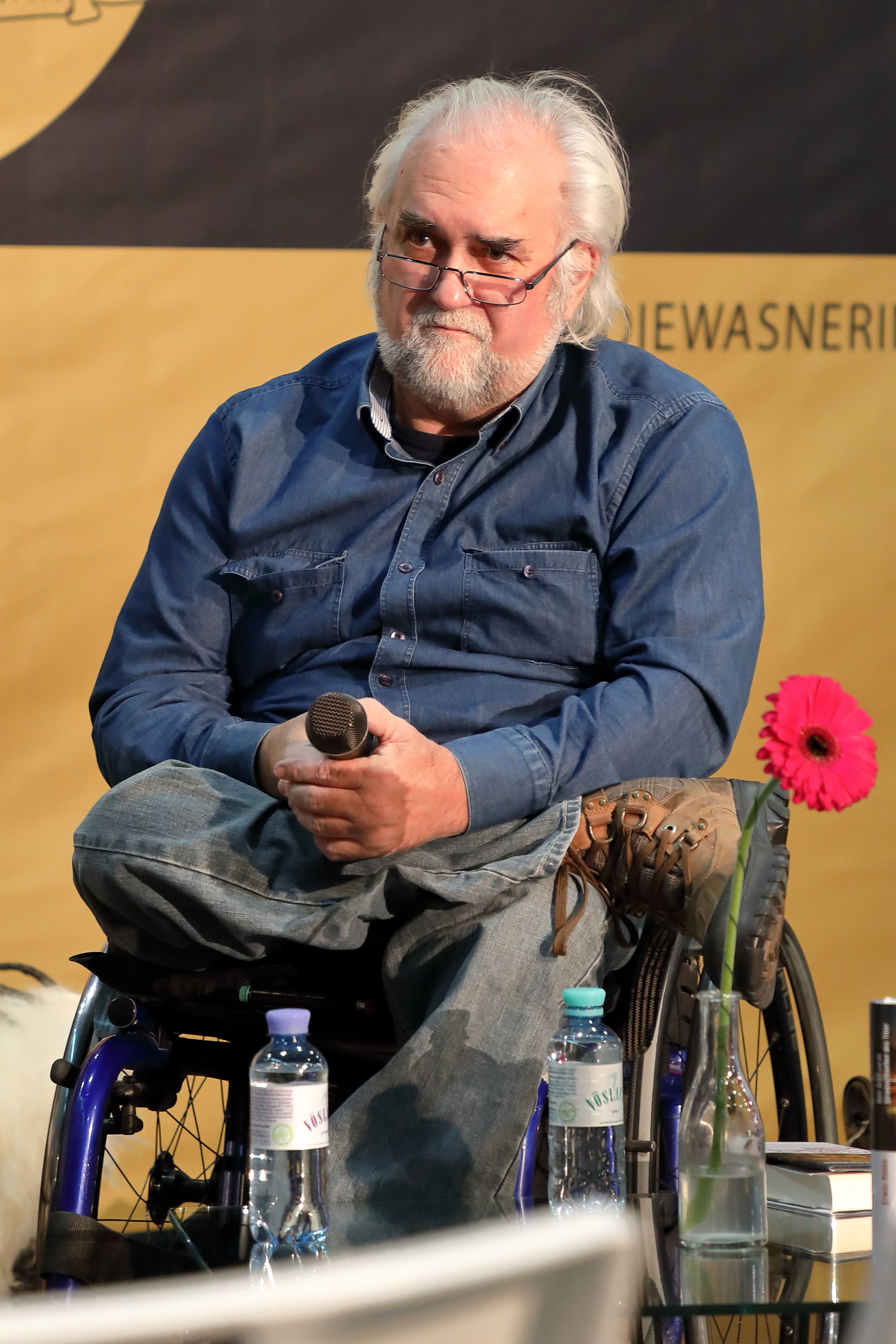
- Riess at the Vienna Book Fair in 2017
- Born: March 13, 1957
- Died: March 25, 2023 (aged 66)
- Website: erwin-riess.at

Erwin Riess (March 13, 1957 – March 25, 2023), was an Austrian political scientist, playwright and journalist. He was a wheelchair user since 1983, an activist for the disabled, and worked as a freelance writer since 1994, authoring plays, radio plays, scripts and prose.

== Life ==
Erwin Riess attended school in Krems, Austria and later returned to Vienna to study political and theatre science. In 1983 he was relegated to a wheelchair after the discovery of a back tumor. Since then he was active in disability campaigns and humanitarian efforts to improve living conditions for disabled persons living in Austria.

He was a freelance writer providing material for magazines and newspapers in addition to writing theatrical works, many of which have been performed internationally. Based on the life of Stephen Hawking, "Hawking's Dream" is his most famous and well-received work.

== Works ==
- Kuruzzen: A Chronicle from the Time of Prince Eugene (1996)
- Adieu Madrid (1997)
- Hawking's Dream (1998)
- Mr. Groll experiences the world (1999)
- Giordanos Order (novel, 1999)
- My Austria (2001)
