= Patti Hammond =

American football fan (1931–2023)

- Born: Patti Hammond; 1931; Seattle, U.S.
- Died: March 4, 2023
- Occupation: Hairdresser
- Known for: Being a Seattle Seahawks superfan

Patti Hammond, known as Mama Blue, was a Pro Football Hall of Famer as a superfan of the Seattle Seahawks. She has been referred to as the "Grande Dame" of Seahawks superfans.

== Life and career ==
Patti Hammond was a cheerleader in high school and while not knowing much about football, purchased Seahawks season tickets as birthday gift for her husband Dick Hammond. She and her husband were Seahawks season ticket holders since their inaugural season in 1976. She was known for her blue wig, feather boa and other Seahawks themed apparel.

Hammond was inducted to the Pro Football Hall of Fame in 1999 as a fan and was later selected to be the first fan to raise the 12th man flag for the Seahawks. She had been interviewed on television multiple times, inspired Halloween tributes, appeared on The Roseanne Show, has her own toy figurine and had her own trading card. Hammond was also part of the Seattle Seahawks Guinness World Record for largest crowd roar. She was also the president of the Seahawks fan club, "The Seahawkers".

Seahawks safety, Kenny Easley, mentioned her in his Pro Football Hall of Fame speech in 2017. She was selected as the Seattle Seahawks Fan of the Year in 2020. She was named the Seattle Met Best champion of Seattle Sports in 2021.

Hammond died on March 4, 2023. Russell Wilson and Pete Carroll expressed their condolences through Twitter at her death. The Seahawks also released a video on her life on their Twitter following her death.
