= Rolando Picchioni =

Italian politician (1936–2023)

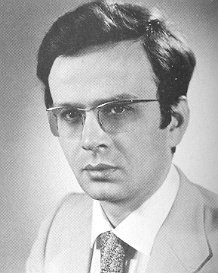
Picchioni in 1970

Rolando Picchioni (21 May 1936 – 23 March 2023) was an Italian politician. A member of Christian Democracy, after having served as a councillor in the Province of Turin, he was a deputy from 1972 to 1983 and undersecretary for cultural heritage from 1979 to 1981. He also served as general secretary of the Turin International Book Fair from 1999 to 2015. Picchioni died on 23 March 2023, at the age of 86.
