= Julien Manzano =

French football player and coach (1937–2023)

Personal information
- Date of birth: 8 April 1937
- Place of birth: Saint-Denis, France
- Date of death: 3 March 2023 (aged 85)
- Height: 1.79 m (5 ft 10 in)
- Position: Midfielder

Senior career*
Years	Team	Apps	(Gls)
1957–1959	Red Star		
1960–1961	Forbach		
1961–1966	Red Star		
1966–1968	Boulogne		

Managerial career
- 1970–1971: Dreux
- 1972–1974: Créteil
- * Club domestic league appearances and goals

Julien Manzano (8 April 1937 – 3 March 2023) was a French professional football player and coach.

== Career ==
Born in Saint-Denis, Manzano played as a midfielder for Red Star, Forbach and Boulogne.

Manzano later managed Dreux and Créteil.
