= Howard F. Taylor =

American sociologist

Howard Francis Taylor (1939 – March 21, 2023) was an American sociologist and Professor of Sociology Emeritus at Princeton University, where he was formerly the director of the African-American Studies program. He was known for his 1980 book The IQ Game, in which he reanalyzed data from several previous reared-apart twin studies of the heritability of IQ. The book concluded, controversially, that the influence of genes on individual differences in IQ scores was small.

== Education and career ==
Taylor graduated Phi Beta Kappa from Hiram College in 1961 and received his Ph.D. from Yale University in 1966. In addition to Princeton University, he has also taught at the Illinois Institute of Technology and Syracuse University. He first joined the faculty at Princeton in 1973.

== Awards and positions ==
Taylor served as president of the Eastern Sociological Society from 1996 to 1997. In 1998, he received the Cox-Johnson-Frazier Award from the American Sociological Association. In 2000, he received the President's Award for Distinguished Teaching from Princeton.

== Books ==
- Balance in Small Groups (Van Nostrand Reinhold, 1970)
- The IQ Game: A Methodological Inquiry into the Heredity-Environment Controversy (Rutgers University Press/Harvester Press, 1980)
