= Ahuva Sherman =

Israeli artist (1926–2023)

- אהובה שרמן
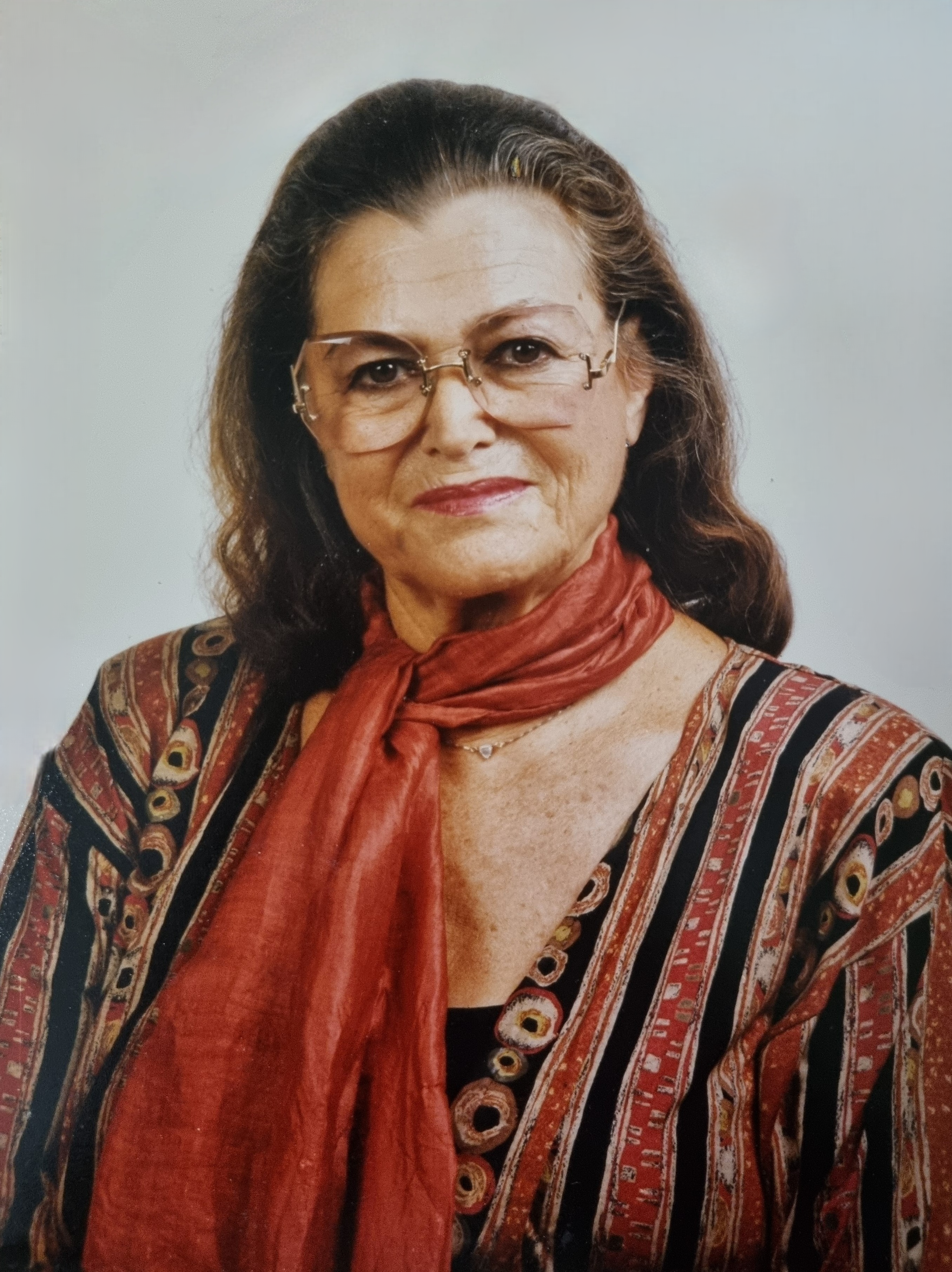
- Born: June 16, 1926; Tel Aviv, Mandatory Palestine
- Died: March 5, 2023 (aged 96)

Ahuva Sherman (Hebrew: אהובה שרמן; 16 June 1926 – 5 March 2023) was an Israeli artist who worked in oil, pastel, and wall tapestries.

== Biography ==
Sherman was born in Tel-Aviv, Palestine, and later lived and worked in Haifa, Israel, with her studio atop Mount Carmel. Ahuva's studies were with Menachem Shemi and P. K. Hoenich at the Hammersmith School of Art in London, England, as well as in the Netherlands and the United States. Her inspiration was drawn from the land of Israel, and this can be seen and felt in her pieces. Israeli themes such as the white buildings of Jerusalem, the waves of the Mediterranean, and views of the country from above are predominant in her work. Ahuva held numerous exhibitions and her art is present in many collections and museums both in Israel and abroad.

Sherman died on 5 March 2023, at the age of 96.

== Solo exhibitions ==
- 1967 Geffen Gallery, Haifa, Israel
- 1968 Lim Gallery, Tel Aviv, Israel
- 1970 Woodstock Gallery, London, UK.
- 1970 Ina Broese Gallery, Amsterdam, Netherlands.
- 1971 De Eik Gallery, Antwerp, DE.
- 1971 Summit Gallery, London, UK.
- 1971 Lim Gallery, Tel Aviv, Israel
- 1972 Chagall House, Haifa, Israel.
- 1973 Leigh Gallery, Manchester, UK.
- 1976 Lim Gallery, Tel Aviv, Israel
- 1977 National Maritime Museum.
- 1978 Gallery of world Art, Boston, USA.
- 1978 Temple Israel, Memphis, Tennessee, USA.
- 1979 Lyon Gallery, San Francisco, California, USA.
- 1981 Auditorium, Haifa, Israel.
- 1982 Amalia Arbel Gallery, Tel Aviv, Israel
- 1984 Municipal Museum, Ramat Gan, Israel.
- 1985 Artists House, Jerusalem, Israel.
- 1987 Miami, Florida, USA.
- 1991 Ein Hod, Artists House.
- 1993 Bloomfield Science Museum, Jerusalem, Israel
- 1994 Auditorium, Haifa, Israel.
- 1999 Zrinski Artists House, Tel Aviv, Israel
- 2001 Kastra Art center, Haifa, Israel.
- 2002 Beit Gabriel- kinneret, Israel.
- 2003 Mitzpe Hayamim, Israel.
- 2006 Tel-Aviv University, Israel.
- 2007 Nagler House, Haifa, Israel.
- 2009 Horas Richter Gallery, Jaffa, Israel.
- 2009 Male Or, Caesarea, Israel.
- 2009 Shagal Artist House, Haifa, Israel.
- 2010 Retrospective, Jerusalem Theatre, Jerusalem, Israel
- 2017 Haifa Municipal Theater, Israel

== Selected Group Exhibitions ==
- 1992 Art Expo, New York City, New York, USA.
- 1998 Higashi, Kobe, Japan.
- 1999 Montserrat Gallery, New York City, New York, USA.
- 2005 Intelect - Israeli Art fest.
- 2005 Hot Summer - Ein Hod.
- 2005 Portrait - Beit Shagal.
- 2005 Printing - Beit Shagal.
- 2006 Monzon Art Gallery, Jerusalem, Israel.

== Selected collections ==
- The Knesset of Israel
- Queen Beatrix of the Netherlands.
- Chaim Herzog, former president of Israel.
- Museum of Modern Art, Haifa.
- The National Maritime Museum, Haifa.
- The Bible Museum, Tel Aviv.
- Temple Israel, Memphis, Tennessee.
- President Jarbas Passarinho, Brazil.
- Louis Mermez, Parliament of France.
- Lady Edmond James de Rothschild, London.
- Mr. Jeoffrey Finsberg J.P M.P
- House of Commons, London.
- Mr. Ed Koch, former mayor of the city of New York.
- Shaarei Zedek Synagogue, Montreal.
- Ha'apala Museum, Haifa.
- First International Bank, Israel.
- Haifa Government Complex, 10m wall Tapestry "Israel from Bird's Eye".
- Haifa Airport Reception Hall.

== Awards ==
- 1965 Audience Choice award, ZOA House, Tel Aviv
- 1979 Hermann Struck Arts Award from the city of Haifa
- 1998 Special Prize at the 'Salute to Israel' Exhibition, Japan, on the 50th Anniversary of Israel.
- 2000 Haifa Municipality award for art amongst 25 distinguished women, each in her individual field, for her special achievement.
- 2013 City Beloved title from the city of Haifa
