= Victor Veretennikov =

Ukrainian politician (1940–2023)

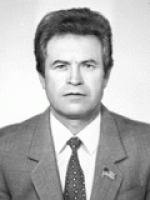
- Veretennikov in 1990

People's Deputy of Ukraine
- In office 14 May 2002 – 25 May 2006
- In office 15 May 1990 – 10 May 1994

Personal details
- Born: Victor Oleksandrovych Veretennikov; 22 August 1940 Dnipropetrovsk, Ukrainian SSR, USSR
- Died: 15 March 2023 (aged 82) Dnipro, Ukraine
- Party: CPSU (until 1966–1991); Independent (since 1991)
- Education: Dnipro Polytechnic
- Occupation: Writer

Victor Oleksandrovych Veretennikov (Ukrainian: Віктор Олександрович Веретенников; 22 August 1940 – 15 March 2023) was a Ukrainian businessman, writer, screenwriter, journalist & politician. A member of the Communist Party of the Soviet Union and later an independent, he served in the Verkhovna Rada from 1990 to 1994 and again from 2002 to 2006.

Veretennikov died in Dnipro on 15 March 2023, at the age of 82.
