= Emmanuelle Mottaz =

French singer and screenwriter (1963–2023)

Emmanuelle Mottaz (19 July 1963 – 16 March 2023), popularly known as Emmanuelle, was a French singer and screenwriter. She wrote for Hélène et les Garçons.

Emmanuelle died on 16 March 2023, at the age of 59.

== Discography ==
=== Albums ===
- 1986: Premier Baiser
- 1987: Emmanuelle
- 1989: Tu seras à mes pieds (Poor rotten baby)
- 1992: Aquarelle et jeunes filles
- 1994: La compilation

=== Singles ===
- 1985: Je t'appelle de Macao
- 1986: Premier Baiser (#2 France)
- 1987: Rien que toi pour m'endormir (#3 France)
- 1987: Ce n'est qu'un voyou
- 1988: Et si un jour
- 1989: Tu seras à mes pieds (#43 France)
- 1989: Parce que c'est toi
- 1990: Poupée de bois
- 1991: Fantaisie
- 1992: Love and kiss
- 1992: Aquarelle et jeunes filles
- 1993: Sur une plage en été
- 1994: Premier baiser (réédition – générique de la sitcom Premiers Baisers)
