= Gianguido Milanesi =

Italian fencer

Personal information
- Born: 26 January 1935 Milan, Italy
- Died: 27 March 2023 (aged 88)

Sport
- Sport: Fencing

Gianguido Milanesi (26 January 1935 – 27 March 2023) was an Italian fencer. He competed in the team foil event at the 1964 Summer Olympics.
