= Spiros Papadopoulos =

Greek psychiatrist and politician (1931–2023)

Member of the Hellenic Parliament for Kavala
- In office 2 June 1985 – 11 September 1993

Personal details
- Born: 7 November 1931 Drama, Greece
- Died: 6 March 2023 (aged 91)
- Party: ND
- Education: Aristotle University of Thessaloniki
- Occupation: Psychiatrist

Spiros Papadopoulos (Greek: Σπύρος Παπαδόπουλος; 7 November 1931 – 6 March 2023) was a Greek psychologist and politician. As a member of New Democracy, he served in the Hellenic Parliament from 1985 to 1993.

Papadopoulos died on 6 March 2023, at the age of 91.
