= Boris Bim-Bad =

Soviet educationalist (1941–2023)

- Борис Бим-Бад
- Bim-Bad in 2011
- Born: Boris Mikhailovich Bim-Bad; 28 December 1941; Sol-Iletsk, Orenburg Oblast, Russian SFSR, Soviet Union
- Died: 1 March 2023 (aged 81)
- Education: Moscow State Pedagogical University (Faculty of History)
- Spouse: Lyudmila Bim-Bad
- Scientific career
- Fields: Research on the theory and history of education, educational anthropology
- Workplaces: Head of the Department of the Moscow Institute of Foreign Languages
- Boris Bim-Bad's voice Boris Bad on the Echo of Moscow program, 1 March 2011

Boris Mikhailovich Bim-Bad (Russian: Борис Михайлович Бим-Бад; 28 December 1941 – 1 March 2023) was a Soviet and Russian teacher and member of the Russian Academy of Education. Bim-Bad, who had an EdD, was a professor and member of the International Philosophical and Cosmological Society.

== Biography ==
Bim-Bad was born in the family of Mikhail Isaakovich Bim-Bad (1901–1960). His uncle, Professor Max Isaakovich Bim-Bad (1914–1996), was the founder and first head of the Department of Economics of road facilities of the Moscow Automobile and Road Institute.

Bim-Bad was a graduate of Moscow State Pedagogical Institute and the Rector of the Russian Open University, later transformed into the University of the Russian Academy of Education.

From 2001 to 2002, he was leading the game show I Know Everything! on channel TV-6. In his opinion, "atheism is a faith, but a savage".

Bim-Bad died on 1 March 2023, at the age of 81.
