= Henk de Jong (theologian) =

Dutch minister and theologian

Henk de Jong (8 February 1932 – 21 March 2023) was a Dutch minister, theologian, and biblical scholar.

He was born in Alblasserdam and studied at the Theological College in Kampen and the University of Leiden. He became a minister in the Reformed Churches in the Netherlands (Liberated) but was suspended at the time of the denominational split that formed the Netherlands Reformed Churches and he left to join that body in 1968.

de Jong was involved in theological education from 1969 to 1998 through the Theological Study Advice Service (Theologische Studiebegeleiding), which in 2006 became the Netherlands Reformed Pastor Training (Nederlands Gereformeerde Predikantenopleiding), a seminary programme operating in conjunction with the Theological University of Apeldoorn.

de Jong wrote a number of books, the most significant of which was Van oud naar nieuw: de ontwikkelingsgang van het Oude naar het Nieuwe Testament [From old to new: The development from the Old to the New Testament] (2002). In it he argued that the Davidic covenant was a strengthening of the Mosaic covenant, meant to anchor and reinforce it. de Jong rejected the inerrancy of Scripture and wrote in favour of homosexual relationships.

Koert van Bekkum and Eric Peels note that de Jong wrote a "remarkable MA thesis" on Old Testament biblical narrative in 1966, long before the ground-breaking studies of Robert Alter and J. P. Fokkelman. They note that he became "especially famous for his creative exegetical contributions to Reformed biblical theology," but suggest that "struggles in the Church frustrated his academic studies."

A professorial chair at the Theological University of the Reformed Churches is named in his honour.
