= Jeremy Lemmon =

British Educator

Jeremy Philip Lemmon (20 November 1935 – 24 March 2023) was a British educator who served as a schoolmaster at Harrow School.

== Early life and career ==
Jeremy Lemmon was born to Richard Lemmon, a businessman, and Dorothy Constance Harris in British India. He spent his early years in India, where his father managed a pharmaceutical business. Lemmon was educated at Harrow and later studied history at Christ Church, Oxford.

Lemmon began his teaching career in 1957 after a National Service medical examination during which a childhood injury exempted him from military service. At Harrow, he directed several school plays, including productions attended by figures such as Prince Edward and Joanna Lumley, whose son later attended the school. His directorial approach often prioritised the poetic elements of drama, particularly Shakespearean language, which notably influenced his students, including actors who have spoken about the impact of his teaching on their careers.

In addition to his work at Harrow, Lemmon was a visiting lecturer at the University of Colorado and produced plays at Haddo House during summer breaks. After retiring, he moved to Ely, Cambridgeshire, and continued to sing with the Ely Choral Society.

== Books ==
- Shakespeare (2007)
