= Władysław Janecki =

Polish politician (1934–2023)

Władisław Leszek Janecki

Member of the Sejm
- In office 13 October 1985 – 3 June 1989

Personal details
- Born: 23 March 1934 Pabianice, Poland
- Died: 6 March 2023 (aged 88)
- Party: PZPR

Władisław Leszek Janecki (23 March 1934 – 6 March 2023) was a Polish politician. A member of the Polish United Workers' Party (PZPR), he served in the Sejm from 1985 to 1989.

Janecki died on 6 March 2023, at the age of 88.
