= Derek Weddle =

English footballer (1935–2023)

Personal information
- Full name: Derek Keith Weddle
- Date of birth: 27 December 1935
- Place of birth: Newcastle upon Tyne, England
- Date of death: 11 March 2023 (aged 87)
- Height: 6 ft 0 in (1.83 m)
- Positions: Inside forward; winger

Senior career*
Years	Team	Apps	(Gls)
–1953	Newcastle United	0	(0)
1953–1956	Sunderland	2	(0)
1956–	Portsmouth	24	(8)
–1961	Cambridge City		
1961–1962	Middlesbrough	3	(1)
1962–1964	Darlington	37	(10)
1964–1966	York City	44	(13)
1966–	Gateshead		
Total		110	(32)
- * Club domestic league appearances and goals

Derek Keith Weddle (27 December 1935 – 11 March 2023) was an English professional footballer who played as an inside forward or a winger in the Football League for Sunderland, Portsmouth, Middlesbrough, Darlington and York City, in non-League football for Cambridge City and Gateshead and was on the books of Newcastle United without making a league appearance. Weddle died on 11 March 2023, at the age of 87.
