= Ronnie Delport =

South African cricketer (1931–2023)

Personal information
- Full name: Ronald Frederick Delport
- Born: 18 November 1931; Claremont, Cape Town, South Africa
- Died: 7 March 2023 (aged 91)
- Batting: Left-handed
- Bowling: Right-arm off-spin

Domestic team information
- Years: Team
- 1950–51 to 1963–64: Western Province

Career statistics
Competition	First-class
Matches	14
Runs scored	152
Batting average	8.44
100s/50s	0/0
Top score	46
Balls bowled	2440
Wickets	35
Bowling average	21.77
5 wickets in innings	2
10 wickets in match	0
Best bowling	7/54
Catches/stumpings	7/–
- Source: Cricinfo, 27 March 2018

Ronald Frederick Delport (18 November 1931 – 7 March 2023) was a cricketer who played first-class cricket for Western Province in South Africa from 1950 to 1964. He was later a cricket administrator.

An off-spinner, Delport made his first-class debut for Western Province at the age of 19 in December 1950 against Rhodesia in the Currie Cup. He took 7 for 54 on the first day, and Western Province won by six wickets. In his next match a few days later he took 5 for 87 in Transvaal's second innings. The rest of his career was less spectacular, and in all he played only 14 first-class matches spread over 14 seasons.

Delport served as president of the Western Province Cricket Union and played a leading role in the Western Province Cricket Association that was created after the end of apartheid.
