= Janine Shalom =

British theatre publicist (1959 – 2023)

Janine Shalom (September 25, 1959 – March 25, 2023) was a British theatre publicist.

== Biography ==
Shalom was born in Didsbury, Manchester, to Ezra Shalom, a textile industry worker, and Queenie Shalom, a homemaker. She attended Mrs Beattie's Primary School and later attended Withington Girls' School. During her childhood, she regularly visited the Manchester Palace Theatre and Manchester Opera House with her family.

After completing her education, Shalom pursued a medical secretarial course at Fielden Park College in Manchester. She subsequently worked at Manchester University Medical School for several years. In 1985, she applied for a secretarial position at the National Theatre in London after responding to a job advertisement, leading her to relocate to London within a week.

At the National Theatre, Shalom became a member of the press team, working under artistic directors Peter Hall, Richard Eyre, and Trevor Nunn. From 1996 to 2004, she served as the director of press and public relations at the Almeida Theatre, collaborating with artistic directors Jonathan Kent and Ian McDiarmid.

In 2004, Shalom joined McDonald & Rutter to establish a theatre publicity department. She continued in this role following the company's merger with Premier Comms in 2006. Starting in 2017, she managed publicity for the Bridge Theatre, which was founded by Nicholas Hytner and Nick Starr. Her work included promoting productions such as Young Marx, A Very Very Very Dark Matter, and Alan Bennett's Allelujah.
