= William E. Cooper (general) =

United States Army general (1929–2023)

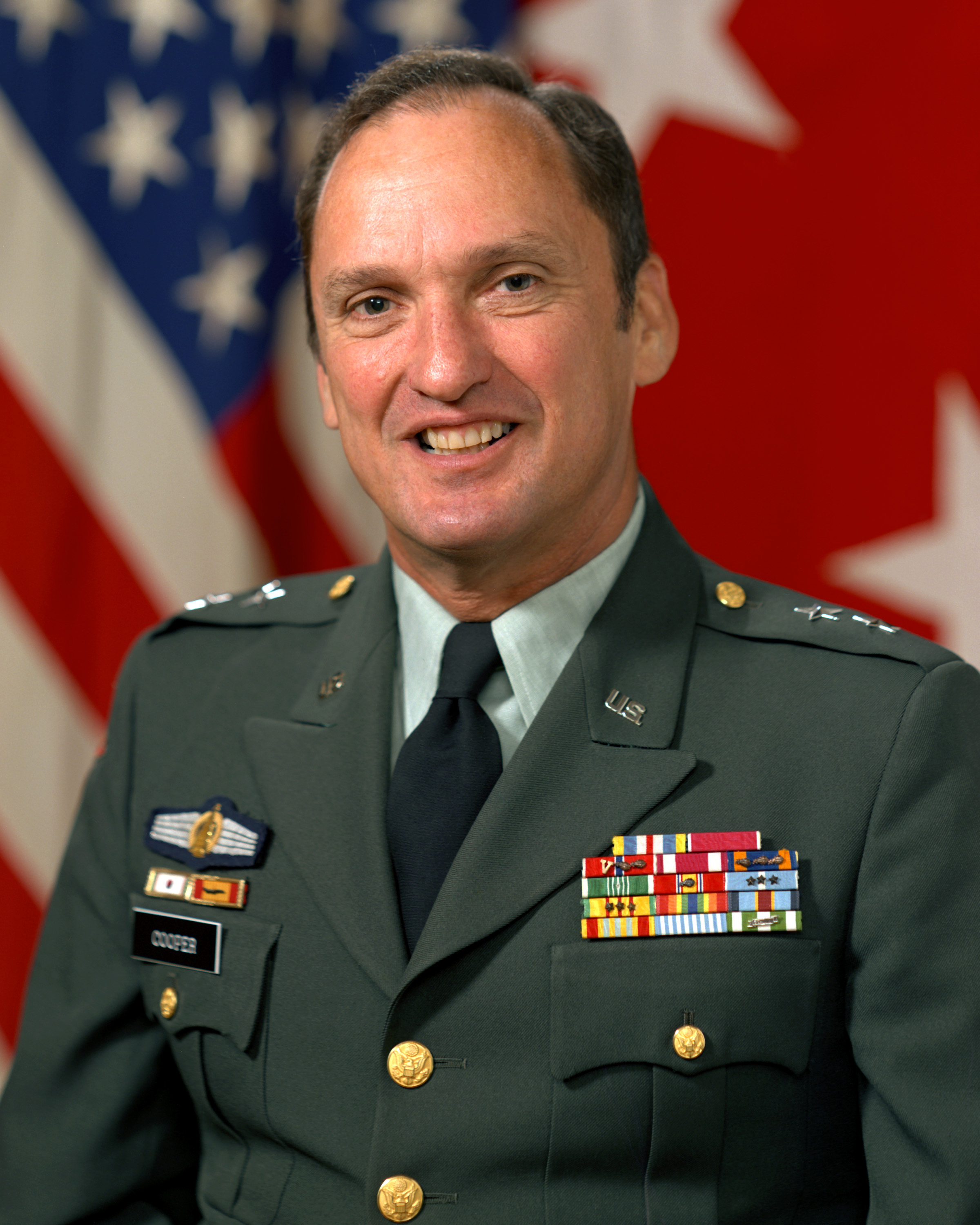
- Born: 19 June 1929; Birmingham, Alabama, U.S.
- Died: 1 March 2023 (aged 93); Sarasota, Florida, U.S.
- Burial place: Sarasota National Cemetery
- Military career
- Allegiance: United States
- Branch: United States Army
- Service years: 1951–1980s
- Rank: Major General
- Commands: Deputy Director for Foreign Intelligence, Defense Intelligence Agency

William Ewing Cooper Jr. (19 June 1929 – 1 March 2023) was a retired major general in the United States Army who served as deputy director for Foreign Intelligence at the Defense Intelligence Agency. He was commissioned through ROTC at The Citadel in 1951, graduating with a B.A. degree in history. Cooper also held an M.A. degree in history from the University of Miami and an M.A. degree in international affairs from Georgetown University. He was a 1962 graduate of the Army Command and General Staff College and a 1964 graduate of the Defense Intelligence School.

He died on 1 March 2023, at the age of 93, "following a brief illness".
