= Sun Yumin =

Chinese actress (1940–2023)

Sun Yumin (Chinese: 孙毓敏; born Yang Yuemin; 1940 – 28 March 2023) was a Chinese Peking opera artist who specialised in dan (female) roles. She was a disciple of Xun Huisheng.

Born in Shanghai, Sun Yumin first rose to stardom in Beijing in the early 1960s. Like most traditional artists, Sun Yumin was persecuted during the Cultural Revolution (1966–1976). Accused of treason, she was locked away in a rural May Seventh Cadre School in Henan, where she suffered daily abuse, including beatings. In 1968, she jumped down from her third floor window to kill herself. She bounced on a tree branch which helped save her life, but broke over 20 bones in her legs and backbone. She was incontinent and could not walk for over a year and spent over five years in the hospital. Her mother killed herself in 1970.

After the Cultural Revolution, she was determined to return to the stage — which she did in 1979 — and carry on the legacy of Xun Huisheng (who was persecuted and died in 1968). Although she had an obvious limp, she trained hard to make it imperceptible during her performances. Sun Yumin also took on over 60 students and authored a number of books, including an autobiography and a biography of Xun Huisheng — the latter of which was adapted, supervised by her, into a 28-episode TV series directed by Xia Gang. She also served as the president of Beijing Xiqu Vocational Institute of Arts (北京戏曲学院).

Sun Yumin died from multiple organ failure on 28 March 2023, at the age of 83.

== Bibliography ==
- Sun Yumin. 我的京剧人生 [My Peking Opera Life] (in Chinese).
