= Franco Rotelli =

Italian psychiatrist (1942–2023)

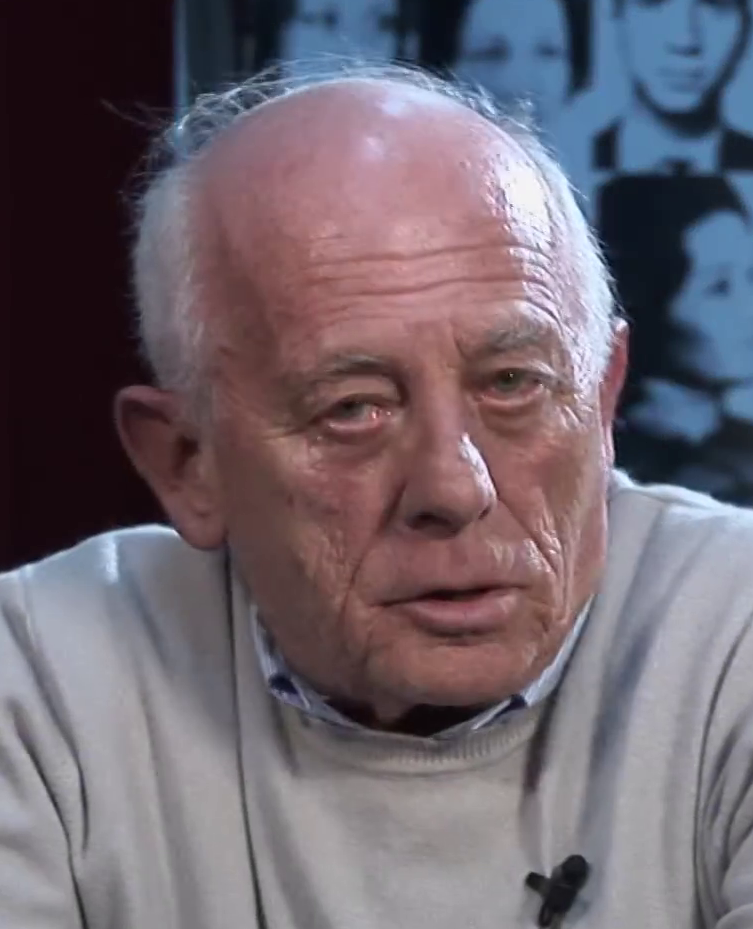
- Rotelli in 2012
- Born: 23 July 1942; Casalmaggiore, Kingdom of Italy
- Died: 16 March 2023 (aged 80); Trieste, Italy
- Occupation: Psychiatrist

Franco Rotelli (23 July 1942 – 16 March 2023) was an Italian psychiatrist and essayist.

== Life and career ==
Born in Casalmaggiore, Rotelli graduated in medicine at the University of Parma and in 1969 started working at the Castiglione delle Stiviere judicial asylum. He became chief physician in 1973, and director of the Trieste Psychiatric Hospital in 1979, a role he held until 1995. He later served as director general of the Trieste and Caserta healthcare agency, and, from 2013 to 2018, as regional councillor with Democratic Party and as president of the Health and Social Policies Commission of the Friuli-Venezia Giulia Regional Council.

A close collaborator of Franco Basaglia, he contributed to the Basaglia Law which reformed the psychiatric system in Italy and led to the closure of the asylums, the abolition of coercive therapies, and the creation of different therapeutic approaches to deal with mental disorders, many of which he had already pioneered in his hospital. He died on 16 March 2023, at the age of 80.

== Literary works ==
- L'impresa Sociale, Milan, Anabasi, 1994, ISBN 9788841770191.
- Per la normalità, Trieste, Casa Editrice Asterios, 1997, ISBN 8885326102.
- Desinstitucionalizacao, San Paolo, Hucitec Editore, 2001.
- Vivir sin Manicomios, Buenos Aires, Editorial Topia, 2014.
- L'istituzione inventata/Almanacco Trieste 1971-2010, Merago, Edizioni Alphabeta Verlag, 2015, ISBN 978-88-7223-234-7.
