= Vadim Oyun =

Soviet-Russian politician (1944–2023)

Member of the Soviet of Nationalities
- In office 1984–1989

Personal details
- Born: Vadim Orambalovich Oyun; 1 January 1944 Kyzyl, Tuvan People's Republic
- Died: 29 March 2023 (aged 79) Tuva, Russia
- Education: Russian State Agrarian University – Moscow Timiryazev Agricultural Academy
- Occupation: Farmer

Vadim Orambalovich Oyun (Russian: Вадим Орамбалович Оюн; 1 January 1944 – 29 March 2023) was a Soviet and Russian farmer and politician. He served in the Soviet of Nationalities from 1984 to 1989.

Oyun died in Tuva on 29 March 2023, at the age of 79.
