= Noriaki Yamada =

Japanese politician (1951–2023)

Chairman of the Ishikawa Prefectural Assembly
- In office 23 March 2012 – 21 March 2013
- Preceded by: Shogo Yamada
- Succeeded by: Yoshimitsu Shimozawa

Member of the Ishikawa Prefectural Assembly
- In office 30 April 1995 – 19 September 2014

Personal details
- Born: 8 October 1951 Yoshinodani, Ishikawa Prefecture, Japan
- Died: 10 March 2023 (aged 71) Hakusan, Ishikawa Prefecture, Japan
- Party: LDP

Noriaki Yamada (Japanese: 山田 憲昭 Yamada Noriaki; 8 October 1951 – 10 March 2023) was a Japanese politician. A member of the Liberal Democratic Party, he served as Chairman of the Ishikawa Prefectural Assembly from 2012 to 2013.

Yamada died from head injuries sustained in a fall in Hakusan, on 10 March 2023. He was 71.
