= Ron Blain =

Australian rules footballer

Personal information
- Full name: Ronald James Blain
- Born: 5 October 1940
- Died: 30 March 2023 (aged 82)
- Original team: Terang
- Height: 180 cm (5 ft 11 in)
- Weight: 76 kg (168 lb)

Playing career^{1}
| Years | Club | Games (Goals) |
| 1962–63 | Footscray | 4 (0) |
- ^{1} Playing statistics correct to the end of 1963.

Ronald James "Blondie" Blain (5 October 1940 – 30 March 2023) was an Australian rules footballer who played with Footscray in the Victorian Football League (VFL).
