= Henk Visser (pediatrician) =

Dutch pediatrician (1930–2023)

Hendrik Klaas Aldert "Henk" Visser (19 June 1930 – 25 March 2023) was a Dutch pediatrician. He was professor of pediatrics at the Erasmus University Rotterdam and the Erasmus MC between 1967 and 1995.

== Life and career ==
Visser was born on 19 June 1930 in Dokkum. He studied medicine at the University of Groningen between 1948 and 1955. He specialized in pediatrics under professor J.H.P. Jonxis. Visser obtained his PhD in 1958. From 1960 to 1961 he was a postdoctoral research fellow at the Boston Children's Hospital.

Visser became professor of pediatrics at the Erasmus University Rotterdam and the Erasmus MC in 1967. He was head of the department of pediatrics of the Erasmus MC and the Sophia Kinderziekenhuis between 1967 and 1995. During this period he managed to turn the aging hospital to the leading academic pediatric centre in the Netherlands. Visser was dean of the faculty of Medicine from 1986 to 1990. He retired in 1995.

From 1971 to 2016 to Visser was involved in the work of the Health Council of the Netherlands, serving as member and heading commissions. He amongst others, served as head of the commission for mandatory polio vaccination and several others regarding nutrition. Within the institution Visser was member of the presidium between 1990 and 2002. He became an honorary member of the institution in 2002. Visser was the first chairman of the Dutch Central Committee on Research Involving Human Subjects from 1 April 1999 to 1 June 2003. In this period the Dutch Medical Research Involving Human Subjects Act was introduced. When European legislation undermined the Dutch integrated assessment system Visser threatened to resign and remained determined in advocating that medical-scientific and ethical aspects could not be separated from one another.

Visser was elected a member of the Royal Netherlands Academy of Arts and Sciences in 1980. In 1997 he was awarded the Gorterpenning by the Nederlandse Vereniging voor Kindergeneeskunde.

Visser was married for 55 years. His wife died in 2013. He died in Rotterdam on 25 March 2023, at the age of 92. Upon his death, the Dutch Association for Pediatrics called Visser one of the founders of the current field of pediatrics in the Netherlands.
