= Walter Gassire =

Uruguayan footballer (1946–2023)

Personal information
- Full name: Walter Antonio Gassire Osorio
- Date of birth: 21 August 1946
- Place of birth: Florida, Uruguay
- Date of death: 19 March 2023 (aged 76)
- Position: Goalkeeper

Youth career
- –1963: Peñarol

Senior career*
Years	Team	Apps	(Gls)
1963–1965	Montevideo Wanderers		
1965–1972	Defensor Sporting		
1974–1980	Toluca		
1980–1981	Atletas Campesinos	15	(0)
1981–1982	Atlético Español	5	(0)
1982–1983	Tampico Madero	26	(0)
- * Club domestic league appearances and goals

Walter Antonio Gassire Osorio (21 August 1946 – 19 March 2023) was a Uruguayan footballer who played as a goalkeeper. He won the Mexican Primera División with Deportivo Toluca.

== Career ==
Born in Florida, Gassire began playing football with the youth teams of C.A. Peñarol. He made his professional debut with Montevideo Wanderers in 1963, and two years later he moved to Defensor Sporting for six seasons.

In 1974, Gassire moved to Mexico where he spent six seasons with Deportivo Toluca, winning the league in 1974–75. He was diagnosed with brain cancer while playing for Toluca in 1980. He recovered and joined Atletas Campesinos but had an injured Achilles tendon and left after six months. He next had a brief stint at Atlético Español and then finished his career at Tampico Madero in 1983.

After he retired from playing, Gassire became a football coach. He was an assistant manager with Toluca in 1986 and again with former teammate, Héctor Hugo Eugui, in 2011.

Gassire died on 19 March 2023, at the age of 76.
