= Jüri Kraft =

Estonian economist and politician (1935–2023)

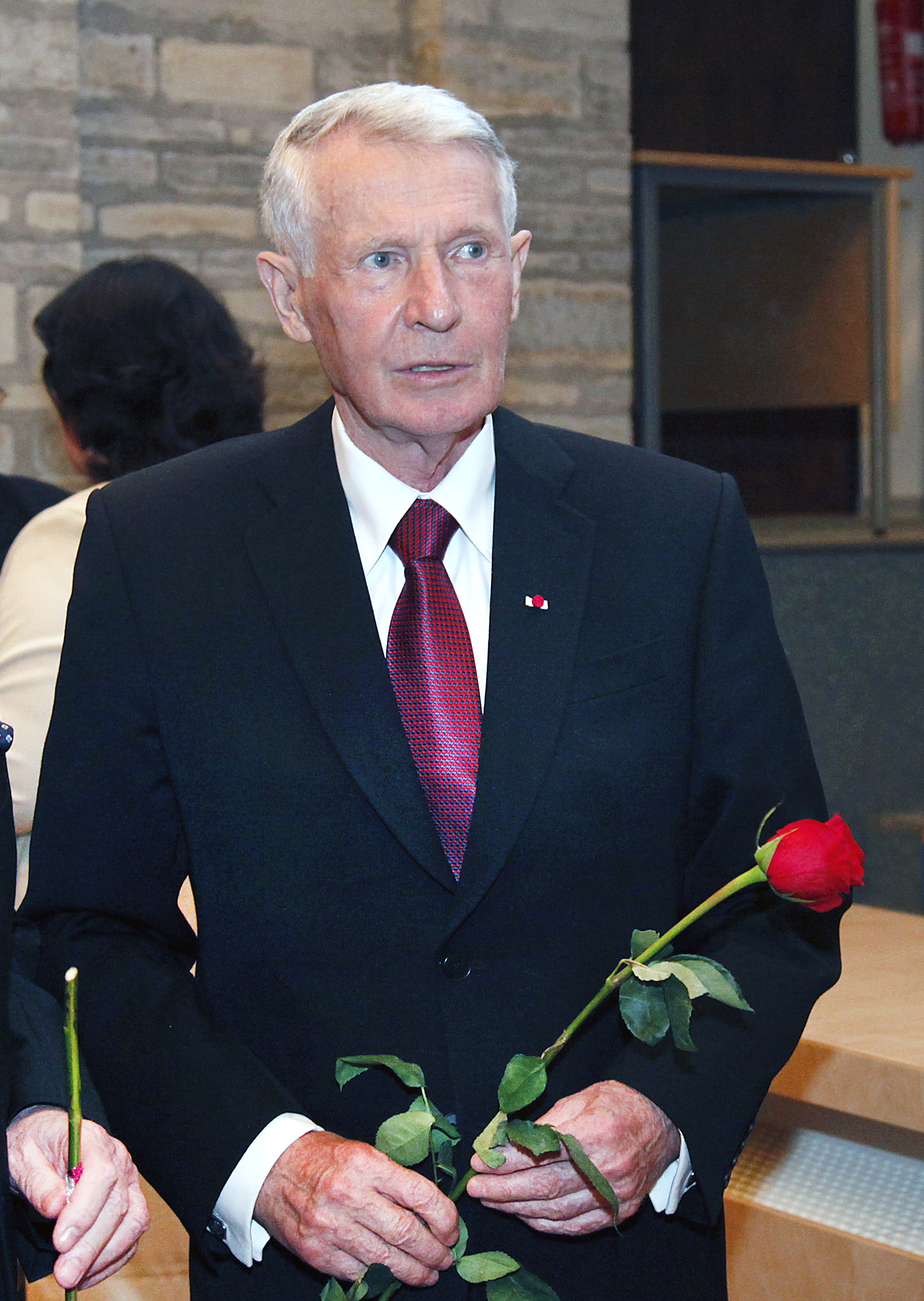
- Kraft in 2021

Member of the Congress of People's Deputies of the Soviet Union
- In office 25 May 1989 – 5 September 1991

Member of the Supreme Soviet of the Estonian Soviet Socialist Republic
- In office 1985–1990

Personal details
- Born: 6 January 1935 Kasepää Parish, Estonia
- Died: 15 March 2023 (aged 88) Tallinn, Estonia
- Education: Tartu State University
- Occupation: Economist

Jüri Kraft (6 January 1935 – 15 March 2023) was an Estonian economist and politician. He served on the Congress of People's Deputies of the Soviet Union from 1989 to 1991.

Kraft died in Tallinn on 15 March 2023, at the age of 88.
