= Karl Nicola =

German politician (1939–2023)

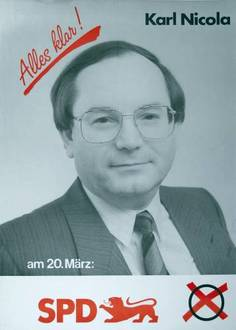
- Nicola election poster in 1988

Member of the Landtag of Baden-Württemberg
- In office 7 June 1972 – 5 April 1992

Personal details
- Born: 3 December 1939 Freiburg im Breisgau, Gau Baden, Germany
- Died: 18 March 2023 (aged 83) Weisweil, Baden-Württemberg, Germany
- Party: SPD
- Occupation: Consultant

Karl Nicola (3 December 1939 – 18 March 2023) was a German consultant and politician. A member of the Social Democratic Party, he served in the Landtag of Baden-Württemberg from 1972 to 1992.

Nicola died in Weisweil on 18 March 2023, at the age of 83.
