= Diane Corcoran =

US Army nurse (1946–2023)

Diane Corcoran R.N., Ph.D. Col. USA (Ret) (July 20, 1946 – March 5, 2023) was an expert in near-death experiences. She had been president of the International Association for Near-Death Studies (IANDS) organization. She received her Ph.D. in Nursing management from the University of Texas in 1981. Corcoran's interest in near-death experiences developed from her combat nursing experience during the Vietnam War. She became one of a number of nurses studying the phenomenon.

== Military career ==
Corcoran commanded a hospital unit for a short time in the 1970s, one of only a few female officers to do so prior to the 1990s. Ranking as a captain in 1976, Corcoran was the chief nurse at the 86th Combat Support Hospital (CSH) at Fort Campbell, Kentucky. The commander of the 101st Airborne Division appointed Corcoran commander of the 86th CSH ahead of the traditional Medical Service Corps (MSC) officer in the unit. Corcoran commanded the 86th CSH for three months before leaving to pursue her doctorate at the University of Texas at Austin.

== Publications ==
- Helping patients who’ve had near-death
- When Ego Dies: A Compilation of Near-Death and Mystical Conversion. (2004) Emerald Ink Publishing. ISBN 1-885373-07-4
