= Mimí Panayotti =

Honduran writer (1938–2023)

- Born: Mimí Nasthas Butto; 1938; La Lima, Honduras
- Died: 31 March 2023 (aged 85); San Pedro Sula, Honduras
- Education: University of San Pedro Sula
- Occupations: Writer, journalist, theologian
- Employer: La Prensa
- Spouse: Juan Panayotti
- Children: 5
- Website: https://www.mimipanayotti.com/

Mimí Nasthas Butto de Panayotti (1938 – 31 March 2023) was a Honduran writer, journalist, and theologian.

== Biography ==
Mimí Panayotti was born in La Lima in 1938. Her parents were immigrants who settled there to work for the Tela Railroad Company. She attended the Esteban Guardiola School in La Lima for primary studies. Some time later she moved to Tegucigalpa to continue her secondary studies. Years later, she and her family moved to La Ceiba, where she met Juan Panayotti, whom she married. She lived with her husband in La Ceiba, where she collected from debtors for her husband's company (now known as Panavisión Industries). She moved to San Pedro Sula when her husband and brother-in-law set up a sign factory in that city. In 1980, she joined the Mother Teresa Charity Mission and obtained a degree in theology. In 1985, she graduated with a licentiate in communication sciences from the University of San Pedro Sula. She has been a columnist for La Prensa since 1983.

A Catholic, Panayotti was known for holding elaborate Christmas celebrations and exhibiting a collection of over 200 nativity scenes.

Panayotti died in San Pedro Sula on 31 March 2023, at the age of 85.

== Works ==
- Con el gozo de servirte (2005)
- ¿Cómo será usted recordado? (2012)
- Billetes bancarios de Honduras 1850–1950 (2014)
- Un poco de mí (2018)
- Confieso que lo disfruté (2018)
