= Daryl W. Preston =

American astronomer and physicist (1939–2023)

- Born: Daryl Wayne Preston; January 15, 1939; Cyril, Oklahoma, U.S.
- Died: March 9, 2023 (aged 84); Berkeley, California, U.S.
- Education: Austin College; University of Kansas
- Occupations: Astronomer, physicist

Daryl Wayne Preston (January 15, 1939 – March 9, 2023) was an American astronomer and physicist.

== Life and career ==
Preston was born in Cyril, Oklahoma, the son of H. M. Preston, a shopkeeper, and Cleva Elizabeth Donnell. He attended Austin College, earning his BA degree in 1961. He also attended University of Kansas, earning his PhD degree in 1970.

Preston served as a professor in the department of physics and astronomy at California State University, East Bay from 1970 to 2001. During his years as a professor, in 1998, he was named a fellow of the American Physical Society, "for substantially advancing and disseminating the art of experimental physics as taught to undergraduates by developing experiments, publishing books, and directing faculty workshops on laboratory physics for undergraduates".

== Death ==
Preston died in Berkeley, California on March 9, 2023, at the age of 83.
