= Alan W. Partin =

American prostate surgeon and researcher

Alan Partin
- Born: March 16, 1961; Mississippi, USA
- Died: March 28, 2023 (aged 62); Baltimore, MD, USA
- Occupation: The Brady Urological Institute Urologist-in-Chief
- Spouse: Vicky Partin
- Children: 2

Academic background
- Education: BSc, Chemistry, 1983, University of Mississippi; MD, 1989, PhD, Pharmacology and Molecular Sciences, 1988, Johns Hopkins School of Medicine
- Thesis: The Development of A System for the Quantitative Analysis of Tumor Cell Motility: Application to Prostate Cancer

Alan Wayne Partin (March 16, 1961 – March 28, 2023) was an American prostate surgeon and researcher. He was the Jakurski Family Director of the Brady Urological Institute, Urologist-In-Chief of Johns Hopkins School of Medicine, and professor of urology, Pathology, and Oncology. In 1993, he developed the PartinTables to help prostate cancer patients get an accurate prediction of their likelihood of being cured.

== Early life and education ==
Partin was born March 16, 1961 and raised in Mississippi where he grew up playing football and basketball. While attending Grenada High School, he ran track and was valedictorian of the 1979 graduating class. He enrolled at the University of Mississippi while majoring in veterinarian studies but switched to chemistry in his second year. Following graduation, Partin enrolled at the University of Mississippi where he was an offensive lineman on the football team from 1979 to 1982, earning two varsity letters. He achieved Academic All-SEC honors and received the National Football Foundation UM Chapter Scholar-Athlete Award. Partin later credited football with training him to accept change and think fast on his feet.

Following his Bachelor of Science degree, Partin completed his medical degree and PhD at Johns Hopkins School of Medicine (JHUSOM). As a graduate student, under the guidance of Patrick Walsh, Partin published Morphometric measurement of tumor volume and percent of gland involvement as predictors of pathological stage in clinical stage B prostate cancer, which has become one of the most referenced papers in the history of urology.

== Career ==
Upon completing his surgical internship, surgical junior residency, and urology residency, Partin accepted a faculty position as an instructor of urology at the JHUSOM in 1994. In 1993, he developed the PartinTables to help prostate cancer patients get an accurate prediction of their likelihood of being cured. The tables originally did not include the Gleason score and were based only on prostate-specific antigen (PSA) and tumor, node, and metastases. The aim of the tables was to help the urologist talk with and counsel prostate cancer patients. He was later promoted to the rank of editor in chief of Urology and the second holder of the Bernard L. Schwartz Distinguished Professor in Urological Oncology. In 2000, Partin co-led a research team to reveal the differing prostate predication cancer risks amongst African American men and Caucasians. His team found that both groups of men could be spared prostate biopsies and instead use fPSA.

In 2005, Partin was appointed the David Hall McConnell Professor in the Department of Urology. While serving in this role, he co-led a study with Stephen J. Freedland which demonstrated that men with high PSA levels prior to prostate removal surgery were significantly more likely to have advanced clinical stages of cancer. In 2013, Partin adapted his tables based on a study of more than 5,600 men treated at JHU. His research team found that having a PSA level of 10 and above was a better cut-off for predicting the spread of disease compared to lower levels. He was later appointed the first holder of the Jakurski Family Directorship, effective January 1, 2015.

== Personal life ==
Partin and his wife Vicky resided in Baltimore, MD and died in Baltimore Maryland in 2023 at 62. They had two sons.
