= Toon Meerman =

Dutch footballer (1933–2023)

Personal information
- Date of birth: 13 October 1933
- Place of birth: Rotterdam, Netherlands
- Date of death: March 2023 (aged 89)
- Position: Striker

Youth career
- RVV Delfshaven
- Feijenoord

Senior career*
Years	Team	Apps	(Gls)
1953–1960	Feijenoord	92	(62)
1960–1962	Excelsior		
- * Club domestic league appearances and goals

Toon Meerman (13 October 1933 – March 2023) was a Dutch footballer who played as a striker. Meerman made his professional debut at Feijenoord and also played for Excelsior.

On 17 March 2023, it was announced that Meerman had died at the age of 89.

== Honours ==
- First match: 6 June 1953: Feijenoord - Xerxes, 2–2
