= 2023 in Brazil =

Events in the year 2023 in Brazil.

== Incumbents ==
=== Federal government ===
- President: Luiz Inácio Lula da Silva
- Vice President: Geraldo Alckmin

=== Governors ===
- Acre: Gladson Cameli
- Alagoas: Paulo Dantas
- Amapá: Clécio Luís
- Amazonas: Wilson Lima
- Bahia: Jerônimo Rodrigues
- Ceará: Elmano de Freitas
- Espírito Santo: Renato Casagrande
- Federal District: Ibaneis Rocha
- Goiás: Ronaldo Caiado
- Maranhão: Carlos Brandão
- Mato Grosso: Mauro Mendes
- Mato Grosso do Sul: Eduardo Riedel
- Minas Gerais: Romeu Zema
- Pará: Helder Barbalho
- Paraíba: João Azevêdo
- Paraná: Ratinho Júnior
- Pernambuco: Raquel Lyra
- Piauí: Rafael Fonteles
- Rio de Janeiro: Cláudio Castro
- Rio Grande do Norte: Fátima Bezerra
- Rio Grande do Sul: Eduardo Leite
- Rondônia: Marcos Rocha
- Roraima: Antonio Denarium
- Santa Catarina: Jorginho Mello
- São Paulo: Tarcísio de Freitas
- Sergipe: Fábio Mitidieri
- Tocantins: Wanderlei Barbosa

=== Vice governors ===
- Acre: Mailza Gomes
- Alagoas: Ronaldo Lessa
- Amapá: Antonio Teles Júnior
- Amazonas: Tadeu de Souza
- Bahia: Geraldo Júnior
- Ceará: Jade Romero
- Espírito Santo: Ricardo Ferraço
- Federal District: Celina Leão
- Goiás: Daniel Vilela
- Maranhão: Felipe Camarão
- Mato Grosso: Otaviano Pivetta
- Mato Grosso do Sul: José Carlos Barbosa
- Minas Gerais: Mateus Simões
- Pará: Hana Ghassan
- Paraíba: Lucas Ribeiro
- Paraná: Darci Piana
- Pernambuco: Priscila Krause
- Piaui: Themístocles Filho
- Rio de Janeiro: Thiago Pampolha
- Rio Grande do Norte: Walter Alves
- Rio Grande do Sul: Gabriel Souza
- Rondônia: Sérgio Gonçalves
- Roraima: Edilson Damião
- Santa Catarina: Marilisa Boehm
- São Paulo: Felicio Ramuth
- Sergipe: Zezinho Sobral
- Tocantins: Laurez Moreira

== Events ==
=== January ===
- 28 December-15 January: Ten members of a family are kidnapped and murdered in the Federal District.
- 1 January:
  - Luiz Inácio Lula da Silva is sworn in as the 39th President of Brazil after defeating incumbent president Jair Bolsonaro in a runoff election held on 30 October 2022, receiving 50.90% of the total votes to Bolsonaro's 49.10%
  - Lula declares three days of national mourning for footballer Pelé, who died on 29 December 2022.
- 3 January: Wake and burial of Pelé at Vila Belmiro in Santos.
- 8 January: Supporters of the previous president, Jair Bolsonaro, invade the Supreme Court of Brazil, National Congress of Brazil, and the Planalto Presidential Palace in the Praça dos Três Poderes in Brasília. A federal intervention in public security in the Federal District is decreed.
- 9 January: STF justice Alexandre de Moraes suspends Ibaneis Rocha, Governor of the Federal District, for 90 days for allowing the invasion of government buildings by Bolsonaro supporters.
- 14 January: Former Minister of Justice and Public Security, Anderson Torres, is arrested in Brasília on charges of facilitating the actions of Bolsonaro supporters during the invasion of the Praça dos Três Poderes.
- 18 January: Lula dismisses 13 more military personnel from the presidential cabinet, whom he blames for the attack in Brasília.
- 19 January: The retail chain Lojas Americanas files for bankruptcy protection after discovering a financial deficit of R$20 million (US$3.88 billion) and blocking part of its accounts due to debts with creditors.
- 20 January:
  - Footballer Dani Alves is arrested in Spain on charges of sexual assault.
  - The Ministry of Health declares a public health emergency in the Yanomami Indigenous Territory.
- 21 January: Commander of the Brazilian Army Júlio César de Arruda is fired by Lula in the aftermath of the Brasília attack and is replaced by Tomás Miguel Ribeiro Paiva.
- 28 January: The Press Vehicle Consortium, which was created in 2020 to disseminate data on the COVID-19 pandemic in Brazil, officially closes.

=== February ===
- 2 February: Former federal deputy Daniel Silveira is arrested in Petrópolis for failing to comply with precautionary measures defined by the Supreme Federal Court.
- 3 February: The navy scuttles the decommissioned aircraft carrier São Paulo into the Atlantic Ocean, following the rejections of injunctions from the Ministry of the Environment and the Federal Public Ministry.
- 5 February: A vessel with 14 people on board sinks in Guanabara Bay, leaving 3 dead and 5 missing.
- 13 February: Heavy rains cause flooding and landslides in São Gonçalo, Rio de Janeiro.
- 18–23 February: Heavy rains cause flooding and landslides in the coastal municipalities of São Paulo. At least 65 people have been killed, of which 64 were in São Sebastião.

=== March ===
- 8 March: Part of the roof of the Osasco Plaza Shopping mall in Greater São Paulo collapses, with no one injured.
- 12 March: At least eight people are killed after a landslide hits homes in the East Zone of Manaus.
- 14 March: A wave of criminal attacks begin in 14 cities in Rio Grande do Norte. The attacks are believed to have been orchestrated by a local crime syndicate after police killed members of the group.
- 16 March:
  - Over 220 Brazilian National Guardsmen are deployed to the northeastern states of Rio Grande do Norte and Paraíba after imprisoned gang members riot, causing three deaths and class cancellations in both states.
  - After being away for 66 days, Ibaneis Rocha returns as Governor of the Federal District after authorization from STF justice Alexandre de Moraes.
- 17 March: A helicopter crashes in Barra Funda (East Zone of São Paulo), killing 4 people.
- 23 March: 13 people are dead after a police raid in a favela in São Gonçalo, Rio de Janeiro. Two of the Comando Vermelho gang leaders from the northern states of Pará and Sergipe are also captured.
- 24 March: Heavy rains cause flooding in six states in the North and Northeast regions.
- 24-26 March: The tenth edition of Lollapalooza.
- 25 March: The inauguration of the São Paulo ePrix.
- 26 March: After 32 years, the band Skank perform their last show in front of 50,000 people at the Mineirão Stadium in Belo Horizonte.
- 27 March: A 13-year-old student carries out a knife attack at a public school in Vila Sônia, São Paulo, resulting in a teacher being killed and five others injured.
- 28 March: Brazil reaches the 700,000 mark of deaths from COVID-19.
- 29 March: Brazil and China sign an agreement to trade in their own currencies, ceasing the usage of the United States dollar as an intermediary.

=== April ===
- 5 April: Four children are killed and five others are injured after a man attacks a kindergarten with a hatchet in Blumenau, Santa Catarina.
- 8 April:
  - A boat carrying tourists sinks in Bertioga, São Paulo, killing two people.
  - Heavy rains cause flooding in 64 municipalities in Maranhão.
- 18 April: The Public Prosecutor's Office of Goiás opens an investigation against football players, betting houses, and betters from Santos FC, S.C. Corinthians Paulista, Red Bull Bragantino, Esporte Clube Juventude, and Cuiabá Esporte Clube under suspicion of manipulation. Arrest and search and seizure warrants are issued in six states.
- 19 April: Gonçalves Dias resigns as Secretary of Institutional Security (GSI) after CNN Brazil releases footage of him and GSI employees guiding Bolsonaro supporters inside the Palácio do Planalto during the Brazilian Congress attack on January 8.
- 26 April:
  - Telegram is blocked again in Brazil after failing to comply with a court ruling by the Espírito Santo Court of Justice (TJES) after failing to hand over evidence of crimes committed by groups considered as neo-Nazi by the Federal Police.
  - The 8 January CPMI is installed in the National Congress of Brazil, which investigates the January 8th attack of the Praça dos Três Poderes.
- 27 April: A building collapses in Olinda, Pernambuco, killing three people.
- 28 April: President Luiz Inácio Lula da Silva signs a law recognizing six indigenous lands.

=== May ===
- 9-10 May: Football clubs participating in the Campeonato Brasileiro Série A remove players who are under investigation per Operation Maximum Penalty.
- 16 May:
  - By unanimous decision, the Superior Electoral Court revokes Deltan Dallagnol's (Podemos-PR) term as federal deputy due to fraud against the Clean Record Act.
  - The Superior Court of Sports Justice (STJD) suspends eight players investigated in Operation Maximum Penalty for fraud in sports betting.
- 22 May:
  - The Ministry of Health declares a state of zoosanitary emergency due to an increase in cases of avian influenza.
  - Rio de Janeiro Police find the body of actor Jeff Machado, who has been missing since the end of January.
- 31 May: The Supreme Federal Court sentences former President Fernando Collor to 8 years and 10 months in prison for passive corruption and money laundering.

=== June ===
- 8 June: A tanker truck carrying fuel overturns and catches fire in Serra de Petrópolis, Rio de Janeiro, killing the driver of the vehicle.
- 15 June: An extratropical cyclone hits Rio Grande do Sul, killing 16 people and leaving around 14,000 homeless.
- 16 June: An earthquake with an estimated magnitude of 4.7 hits municipalities on the coast of São Paulo and the Ribeira Valley.
- 17 June: At least eight people are killed and 19 others are missing after a severe storm in Rio Grande do Sul.
- 19 June: A gunman kills two people at a public school in Cambé, Paraná.
- 26 June: A fire breaks out at a landfill in Teresópolis, Rio de Janeiro, covering the city with smoke.
- 28 June: Data is released from the 2022 Brazilian census, with the country officially having 203,602,512 inhabitants.
- 30 June: By a vote of 5 to 2, the Superior Electoral Court renders former president Jair Bolsonaro ineligible to run for political office for 8 years.

=== July ===
- 6 July: The Chamber of Deputies approves the basic text of the tax reform bill; goes to the Senate.
- 8 July: A building collapses in Paulista, Pernambuco, leaving at least 14 people, including four children, dead.
- 12 July: Rio Grande do Sul is hit again with an extratropical cyclone, also reaching cities in Santa Catarina.
- 26 July:
  - A silo of a grain cooperative in Palotina, Paraná, explodes, leaving 8 dead, 11 injured, and one missing. Among the fatal victims are 7 Haitians.
  - Another extratropical cyclone, of lesser intensity, hits the South Region, being the fourth to hit the area since June.
- 27-31 July: A police operation in Guarujá, São Paulo is launched after the death of a ROTA soldier, resulting in sixteen people being killed.

=== August ===
- 2 August: At least 10 people are killed during a police raid on a favela in Complexo da Penha, Rio de Janeiro.
- 3 August: Cristiano Zanin, former lawyer of Lula, takes seat as Justice of the Supreme Federal Court.
- 8 August: A Navy helicopter crashes during training in Formosa, Goiás, leaving 2 dead and 12 injured.
- 9 August:
  - Former director of the Federal Highway Police, Silvinei Vasques, is arrested in Florianópolis due to an ongoing investigation with interference in the 2022 elections.
  - Luís Roberto Barroso is elected President of the Supreme Federal Court .
- 15 August: A nationwide blackout ensues, as all of the states are connected to the national energy system. Roraima is the only state that is unaffected, due to its own energy system. The cause of the outage is still unknown.
- 17 August: Quilombola leader and ialorixá, Mother Bernadette, is assassinated in Simões Filho, Bahia.
- 20 August: A bus carrying Corinthians fans overturns on the Fernão Dias Highway (near Igarapé, Minas Gerais), killing seven people.

=== September ===
- 1 September: Four people are killed and at least 30 others are injured in a boiler explosion at a metal factory in Cabreuva, São Paulo.
- 2 September: Actor Kayky Brito has been run over by a car while crossing a street in Rio de Janeiro. The actor has been hospitalized and is said to be in serious condition after suffering multiple fractures.
- 3 September: Ultraje a Rigor member Mingau, is shot in the head during an attempted robbery in Paraty, Rio de Janeiro.
- 4 September: A disastrous extratropical cyclone hits the state of Rio Grande do Sul (for the third time) and Santa Catarina, leaving at least 47 dead, 940 injured, 46 missing, 3,800 homeless, and 25,855 displaced.
- 8 September: Neymar Jr. surpasses Pelé as the top scorer of the Brazilian national team after scoring his 78th goal against Bolivia.
- 14 September: The Supreme Federal Court sentences three people to at least 14 years in prison, for their involvement in storming the buildings of all three branches of government on January 8.
- 16 September: A plane crash in Barcelos, Amazonas kills 14 people.
- 17 September:
  - A strong heat wave begins in Brazil, with temperatures recorded at above 40 °C in several states.
  - A 3-year-old girl, named Heloisa, dies from irreversible cardiorespiratory arrest after being shot nine days prior by a Federal Highway Police in Rio de Janeiro.
- 19 September: The São Paulo City Council revokes the mandate of councilman Camilo Cristófaro (Avante) with 45 votes in favor, five abstentions, and no votes against the loss of the mandate, due to a racist speech he gave.
- 21 September: By 9 votes to 2, the STF plenary session overturns the temporal framework for indigenous lands.
- 27 September: Due to the encounter of a cold front with a heat wave, heavy storms hit several cities the state of São Paulo, with records of intense winds and hail.
- 28 September: Luís Roberto Barroso assumes the Presidency of the Supreme Federal Court.

=== October ===
- 2 October: The Brazilian government begins expelling non-indigenous residents off the Apyterewa and Trincheira Bacajá indigenous territories in Pará.
- 3 October: Employees of CPTM, São Paulo Metro, and Sabesp go on strike for 24 hours, to protest the privatization of the companies.
- 5 October: Three doctors are shot dead at a kiosk in Barra da Tijuca, Rio de Janeiro.
- 11 October: The city of Manaus is covered in smoke, due to Amazon rainforest wildfires.
- 14 October: The annular solar eclipse occurs in Brazil and other countries in the Americas. This is the 44th solar eclipse of Solar Saros 134.
- 23 October:
  - A 16-year-old carries out a school shooting in Sapopemba (East Zone of São Paulo), where one student died and three others were injured.
  - A wave of violent attacks occurs throughout neighborhoods in the West Zone of Rio de Janeiro after a militia member was killed in a police operation. 35 buses and a train are set on fire.
- 29 October: A plane crashes in Rio Branco, Acre, killing all 12 people on board.
- 31 October:
  - Former senator Telmário Mota is arrested in Nerópolis, Goiás, after being accused of ordering his ex-wife's murder.
  - The Superior Electoral Court (TSE) sentences former President Jair Bolsonaro and former Defence Minister Walter Braga Netto to ineligibility for eight years, due to political use of the bicentennial celebrations of Brazil's Independence in 2022.

=== November ===
- 3 November: November 3, 2023 Brazil storm: Strong windstorm with gusts up to 150 kph hit several cities of the state of São Paulo. At least 8 were death.
- 4 November: Fluminense FC win their first ever Copa Libertadores after defeating Boca Juniors 2-1 in extra time.
- 8 November: A new heat wave in Brazil begins, where several states are hit with record temperatures above 40 °C (104 °F).
- 17 November: Around a thousand people fainted due to intense heat during the first concert of Taylor Swift's The Eras Tour at the Estádio Olímpico Nilton Santos in Rio de Janeiro. A fan named Ana Clara Benevides Machado suffers cardiorespiratory arrest and dies during the concert.
- 19 November: Brazil records its hottest temperature ever at 44.8 °C (112.6 °F), in Araçuaí, Minas Gerais.
- 30 November: The Maceió City Hall declares a state of emergency due to the "imminent collapse" of a mine belonging to Braskem in the area of Mundaú Lagoon, in the Mutange neighborhood.

=== December ===
- 4 December: Singer Alexandre Pires is the target of an investigation by the Federal Police for having received almost R$1.4 million from a company linked to illegal mining in the Yanomami Indigenous Land. Alexandre's manager, Matheus Possebon, was arrested by federal agents along with Christian Costa dos Santos, who is involved in illegal mining.
- 5 December: Heavy rain causes flooding, a blackout, and cars stranded in Uberlândia, Minas Gerais.
- 10 December:
  - A fire caused by a short circuit in the electrical grid of a camp of the Landless Workers' Movement in Parauapebas, Pará, leaves nine dead.
  - A part of the Braskem mine collapses in Maceió.
- 13 December: A Rio de Janeiro court acquits Fábio Raposo Barbosa and convicts Caio Silva de Souza to 12 years in prison for the death of Santiago Andrade, a cameraman for TV Bandeirantes who was hit by a firework during a protest in downtown Rio de Janeiro in 2014.
- 17 December: Former soccer player Marcelinho Carioca is kidnapped in Itaquaquecetuba, São Paulo. Later in the afternoon, police find and rescue him. Five people are arrested, suspected of being involved in the crime.
- 18 December: Paulo Gonet officially takes office as the Prosecutor General of the Republic.
- 20 December: The National Congress approves bill on tax reform.
- 21 December:
  - The roof of a church collapses in Montezuma, Minas Gerais, injuring around 80 people.
  - President Luiz Inácio Lula da Silva officially signs a law that makes Black Consciousness Day a federal holiday on November 20.
  - American singer Beyoncé makes a surprise visit to Salvador, Bahia, to perform at a fan event.
- 23 December: A small plane crashes in Jaboticabal, São Paulo, killing five people (three adults, a teenager, and child).
- 31 December: A gas explosion causes a residential building to partially collapse in Aracaju, Sergipe, killing at least five people and injuring fourteen.

== Sport ==
- 2023 in Brazilian football

== Deaths ==
=== January ===
- 8 January
  - Walter Tosta, 66, politician, deputy (2011–2015).
  - Roberto Dinamite, 68, footballer (Vasco da Gama, national team) and politician, deputy (1995–2015).
- 12 January – Claudio Willer, 82, poet and translator.
- 25 January – José Reis Pereira, 79, teacher and politician.
- 28 January – Paulo Roberto de Souza Matos, 78, politician.
- 29 January – Adriana Dias, 52, feminist anthropologist.
- 31 January
  - Ilya São Paulo, 59, actor.
  - Cleonice Berardinelli, 106, scholar.

=== February ===
- 2 February – Glória Maria, 73, journalist, reporter, and television host.
- 3 February
  - José Luiz de Magalhães Lins, 93, banker.
  - Roberto Purini, 85, lawyer and politician.
- 12 February – Amazonino Mendes, 83, politician.
- 14 February – Vito Schlickmann, 94, Roman Catholic prelate.
- 21 February – Iris de Araújo, 79, politician.
- 22 February – Germano Mathias, 88, singer-songwriter and composer.

=== March ===
- 3 March – Sueli Costa, 79, singer-songwriter and composer.
- 4 March
  - Paulo Caruso, 73, satirical cartoonist.
  - Romualdo Arppi Filho, 84, football referee.
- 12 March – Antônio Pedro, 82, actor, comedian, stage director and playwright.
- 13 March – Eliseu Padilha, 77, lawyer and politician.
- 15 March
  - Théo de Barros, 80, composer.
  - José Elias Moreira, 82, businessman and politician.
- 17 March – Edmar Moreira, 83, lawyer and politician.
- 25 March – Juca Chaves, 85, comedian, singer and writer.
- 29 March – Gilmara Sanches, 79, actress.
- 31 March – Palmério Dória, 74, journalist and writer.

=== April ===
- 1 April – Lúcio Ignácio Baumgaertner, 91, Roman Catholic prelate.
- 2 April – José Jovêncio Balestieri, 83, Roman Catholic prelate.
- 4 April – Rinaldo Amorim, 82, footballer.
- 6 April – Nei Paulo Moretto, 86, Roman Catholic prelate.
- 8 April – Paulo de Tarso Sanseverino, 63, jurist, magistrate, and academic.
- 16 April – Antônio Celso Queiroz, 89, Catholic prelate.
- 17 April – Ivan Conti, 76, drummer (Azymuth).
- 18 April – Boris Fausto, 92, historian, political scientist and writer.
- 26 April – Alzira Rufino, 73, feminist and black activist.

=== May ===
- 1 May – Felipe Colares, 29, mixed martial artist.
- 7 May – Palmirinha Onofre, 91, cook and TV presenter.
- 8 May – Rita Lee, 75, rock singer and composer.
- 9 May – David Michael dos Santos Miranda, 37, politician.
- 11 May – Ana Paula Borgo, 29, indoor volleyball player.
- 12 May – Dum-Dum, 54, rapper.
- 16 May – Nelsinho Rosa, 85, football coach and player.
- 22 May – Vágner Benazzi, 68, professional football coach and former player.
- 28 May – Carlos Alberto Prates Correia, 81, screenwriter and film director.

=== June ===
- 5 June – Astrud Gilberto, 83, samba and bossa nova singer.
- 7 June – Baena Soares, 92, diplomat.
- 9 June – Wladimir Pomar, 86, journalist.
- 15 June – Albeneir, 65, professional footballer.
- 17 June – Dave Maclean, 78, singer-songwriter.
- 21 June – Lucia Hippolito, 72, political scientist, journalist, and commentator.

=== July ===
- 2 July – Sepúlveda Pertence, 85, President of the Superior Electoral Court (2003–2005)
- 4 July
  - Siqueira Campos, 94, former Governor of Toncatins.
  - Chico Ferramenta, 64, politician and member of the Chamber of Deputies of Brazil (1995–1996).
- 6 July – Zé Celso, 86, actor and playwright.
- 7 July – Neusa Maria Faro, 78, actress.
- 14 July
  - Sérgio Amaral, 79, Minister of Development, Industry, Trade and Services (2001–2003) and Brazilian Ambassador to the United States (2016–2019).
  - Luís Rocha Filho, 59, lawyer and politician.
- 15 July – Daniel Frasson, 56, football player and coach.
- 17 July
  - José Bonifácio Novellino, 78, economist and politician.
  - João Donato, 88, musician.
  - Palhinha, 73, footballer.
- 24 July
  - Leny Andrade, 80, singer.
  - Dóris Monteiro, 88, singer and actress.
- 26 July – Geraldo Lyrio Rocha, 81, Roman Catholic prelate.

=== August ===
- 7 August – Aracy Balabanian, 83, actress.
- 9 August – Aderbal Freire Filho, 82, actor and television presenter.
- 13 August – José Murilo de Carvalho, 83, historian.
- 15 August – Léa Garcia, 90, actress.
- 17 August – Mãe Bernadete, 72, quilombo leader.
- 23 August
  - Eduardo Barbosa, 64, politician.
  - Francisco Dornelles, 88, economist and politician.
- 25 August – Carlos Gonzaga, 99, singer.
- 31 August – Salatiel Carvalho, 69, evangelical pastor, engineer, and politician.

=== September ===
- 5 September
  - Antonio Galves, 76, mathematician and professor.
  - José Gregori, 92, lawyer and politician.
- 7 September – Raimundo Varela, 75, television presenter.
- 21 September – Walewska Oliveira, 43, volleyball player.
- 22 September – Maria Carmem Barbosa, 76, screenwriter and playwright.
- 30 September – Eurico dos Santos Veloso, 90, Roman Catholic prelate.

=== October ===
- 4 October – Murílio de Avellar Hingel, 90, geographer and politician.
- 6 October – Moreira Alves, 90, academic and magistrate.
- 9 October – Mauro Morelli, 88, Catholic prelate.
- 12 October – Álvaro Correia, 90, journalist and politician.
- 13 October – João Luiz Ribeiro, 64, gymnast.

=== November ===
- 1 November – Cláudio Strassburger, 95, lawyer and politician.
- 3 November – Elizângela, 68, actress and singer.
- 5 November – Lolita Rodrigues, 94, actress and television presenter.
- 20 November – Alberto Pinto Coelho Júnior, 78, former Governor of Minas Gerais (2014–2015).
- 23 November – Rubens Minelli, 94, football player and manager.

=== December ===
- 3 December – Gil Brother, 66, humorist (Hermes & Renato) and Internet personality.
- 16 December – Carlos Lyra, 90, singer and composer.
- 27 December – PC Siqueira, 37, vlogger, television personality and comic book colorist.
- 29 December – Gil de Ferran, 56, French-born professional racing driver.

== See also ==
- COVID-19 pandemic in South America
- Mercosur
- Organization of American States
- Organization of Ibero-American States
- Community of Portuguese Language Countries
