= Eduardo Barbosa =

Eduardo Barbosa may refer to:

- Eduardo Barbosa (footballer)
- Eduardo Barbosa (judoka)
- Eduardo Barbosa (politician)
