= CPX =

CPX may refer to:

- Benjamín Rivera Noriega Airport (IATA code), Puerto Rico
- 8-Cyclopentyl-1,3-dimethylxanthine, a drug
- Ciclopirox, an antifungal drug
- Clinical performance exam, formally objective structured clinical examination, a prerequisite to working in various health care fields
- Clinopyroxene, monoclinic pyroxene, an igneous and metamorphic mineral
- The Centre for Public Christianity, a not-for-profit media company that offers a Christian perspective on contemporary life
- A Command Post Exercise, a tabletop military exercise
- Control Panel eXtension modules of Atari ST computers
- CPX, abbreviation for favelas in Rio de Janeiro, Brazil
- CPX Test; Cardiopulmonary Exercise Test, or Cardiac stress test
