= Death of Ana Clara Benevides =

2023 death of a Brazilian concertgoer

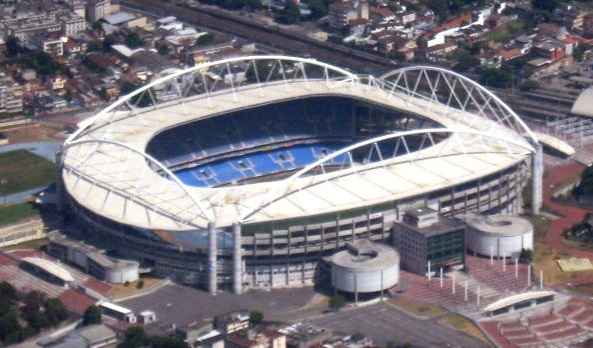
- Estádio Olímpico Nilton Santos, where the incident took place
- Date: 17 November 2023; 2 years ago
- Time: c. 7:30 p.m. BRT (UTC−03:00)
- Location: Estádio Olímpico Nilton Santos, Rio de Janeiro, Brazil; 22.8933°S 43.2923°W
- Type: Cardiac arrest from heat exhaustion
- Deaths: Ana Clara Benevides Machado (aged 23)

On 17 November 2023, Brazilian student Ana Clara Benevides Machado died from a cardiac arrest at a concert of the Eras Tour by the American singer-songwriter Taylor Swift at Estádio Olímpico Nilton Santos, Rio de Janeiro, amidst a heat wave and a venue ban on personal water bottles. Her death triggered controversy, as well as nationwide censure and legislative action, culminating in a 2026 federal law enforcing free drinking-water access across all venues in Brazil.

On the day of the concert—which was attended by over 60,000 people—Rio de Janeiro recorded an abnormal heat index of 59.3 °C (138.7 °F) due to a heat wave in Brazil. T4F reportedly prohibited concertgoers from bringing their own food and water into the venue, citing "security concerns", which caused about one thousand dehydrated attendees to faint before and during the show. Benevides queued outside the stadium for around eight hours before stadium personnel allowed entry. She posted pictures and videos of herself to social media and described the drawn-out waiting experience as a "mess". Feeling unwell, she reported to paramedics and fainted shortly after the concert began. She was transported to Salgado Filho Hospital, where she arrived without a pulse; the hospital declared her dead after an hour of failed resuscitation attempts.

The death sparked widespread public condemnation of T4F for poor concert management. Many Swifties claimed that the water bottle ban, exacerbated by the heat wave and the stadium's closed vents, caused attendees to fall sick and led to Benevides' death. A criminal investigation was opened to determine an official cause of death and a consumer inquiry was launched on the event organizer T4F, a Brazilian entertainment company. Forensic analysis attributed Benevides' cardiac arrest to heat exhaustion. Swift publicly grieved for Benevides and postponed her 18 November concert to 20 November, citing "extreme temperatures". Politicians such as the federal minister of justice and public security, Flávio Dino, and the mayor of Rio de Janeiro, Eduardo Paes, announced that precautions would be implemented at future events, with free water stations amongst other obligations. Congresswoman Erika Hilton opined that T4F should be held accountable and voiced for a bill that criminalizes lack of free water at concerts. On 22 November 2023, the government of Brazil passed a federal ordinance mandating free and easily accessible water stations at events henceforth. Some of the Critics considered the death a consequence of climate inaction and urged for relevant governmental initiatives in Brazil.

By 2024, around 100 municipal and state legislatures in Brazil enshrined mandatory water access at large-scale events into law, attributing it to the "Taylor Swift effect". In September 2026, Brazilian president Luiz Inácio Lula da Silva signed into federal law the bill securing access to free-of-cost drinking water at public venues.

== Background ==
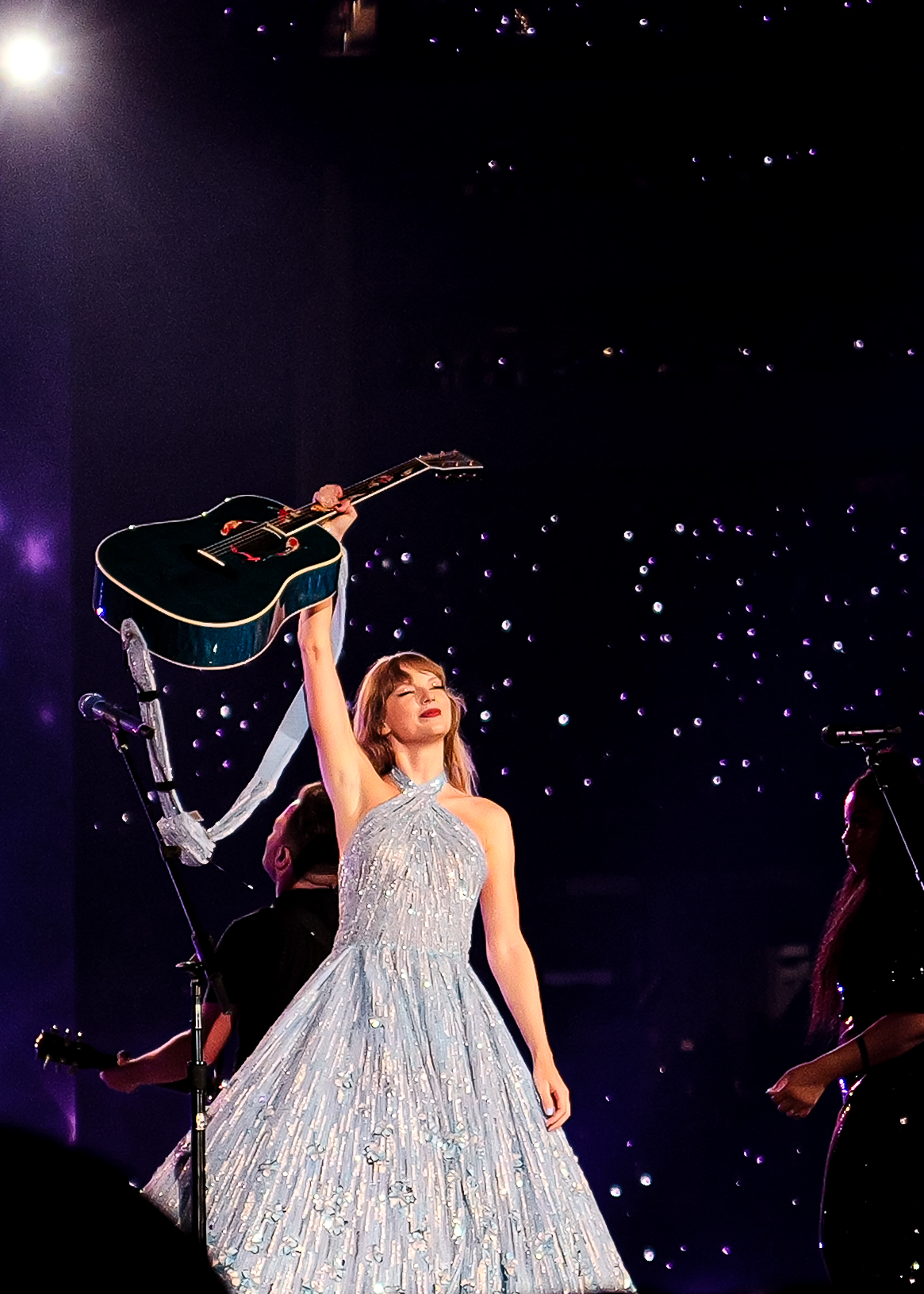
Taylor Swift during the Eras Tour (Inglewood, California, 2023)

Taylor Swift announced the Latin American leg of her sixth headlining concert tour, the Eras Tour, on 2 June 2023, with Rio de Janeiro and São Paulo amongst its stops in November 2023, marking Swift's return to Brazil after an eleven-year gap. More shows were added in both cities following high demand.

Brazilian entertainment company T4F – Time For Fun served as the official event organizer for the tour's Brazilian leg, responsible for the ticket sales and stadium management in the country. A well-known entertainment company in Latin America, T4F was once considered one of the top tour promoters by American music industry magazine Billboard. T4F mainly offers services for event promotion, operations of box office and venue, and food, beverage and merchandise sales amongst others, according to its official website. Unrest was reported on 11 June 2023, outside the Rio de Janeiro and São Paulo venues' box offices as scalpers attempted to bypass the queued fans, including some armed scalpers who threatened violence; police arrived at the scene to maintain order. T4F was reported over 100 times to authorities for their inaction. On 20 June, congress members of Brazil filed the "Taylor Swift Law", which penalized scalpers with up to four years in prison and a fine of up to 100 times the value of the ticket. According to a report by The Washington Post, "Swift's team didn't directly hire the company" for the Brazilian leg.

From 14 November 2023, Brazil began experiencing a heat wave, with red alerts issued to around 3,000 towns and cities across the country. According to The Independent, "over a hundred million people have reportedly been impacted by the extreme weather".

=== Biography ===
Ana Clara Benevides Machado was born on 22 July 2000, in Sonora, Mato Grosso do Sul, Brazil. She had been living in Rondonópolis, Mato Grosso, where she studied psychology at the Federal University of Rondonópolis and was scheduled to graduate in April 2024. Benevides was described by her friends as a person who "loved" Swift and was fulfilling a "dream" by traveling across the country on her first airplane flight to watch Swift perform live.

== Incident ==
The first Brazilian concert of the Eras Tour was held in Rio de Janeiro on 17 November 2023. Over 60,000 people attended the concert. T4F reportedly prohibited concertgoers from bringing their own food and water inside the venue, citing "security concerns". T4F sold 300 ml cups of drinking water inside the stadium; one fan said they "were expensive and hard to get a hold of"; as per The Washington Post, the water cups cost $2 each, but many attendees "found themselves stuck in crowds too dense for vendors to reach". According to Variety, it was one of the hottest days recorded in Rio de Janeiro, with a heat index of 59.3 °C (138.74 °F), exacerbated by humidity of 84% and a lack of a breeze. A number of fans became dehydrated and fainted before and during the show; video footage posted to social media showed queued fans with disposable coolers, fans, umbrellas and bags of ice. Time reported that thousands of fans, especially those with general admission tickets for the floor, waited for hours in the sun before being allowed inside the stadium around 7:30 p.m.

Benevides and a friend arrived at the concert venue, Estádio Olímpico Nilton Santos, at approximately 11:00 a.m. BRT; they were "early-entry" VIP ticket holders. Benevides created a WhatsApp group to keep her family updated on the concert and would regularly share pictures and videos. Benevides posted a video of herself on Instagram queueing to enter the stadium while seeking shade under an umbrella. Benevides told her followers, while fanning her face, that she arrived at 11 a.m. and that she was "still in the mess". Another attendee compared the conditions inside of the stadium to a sauna: "It was extremely hot. My hair got so wet from sweat as soon as I came in. There was a point at which I had to check my breathing to make sure I wasn't going to pass out." Others stated that the venue closed its vents, which used to be open, to prevent outsiders from viewing the concert and that the stadium's sod in the VIP section was covered with metal sheeting which had heated up in the sun and burned some attendees who attempted to sit on it. Benevides drank plenty of water but saw several concertgoers looking "distressed" and others "yelling for water". Benevides and her friend brought water with them, which they drank while they waited outside of the venue; once inside, they purchased room temperature water from T4F.

Before the show began, Benevides reported to paramedics present at the stadium that she was feeling unwell. She fainted at around 7:30 p.m., during Swift's performance of "Cruel Summer", the second song on the show's set-list. According to T4F, paramedics attended to Benevides before she was rushed to a first aid centre, and then to Salgado Filho Hospital, where she died an hour later, despite several resuscitation attempts. Rio de Janeiro's health service agency reported that she arrived at the hospital without a pulse. The state's public prosecutor opened a criminal investigation and announced that Benevides' body was being examined to determine a cause of death. Folha de S.Paulo reported cardiorespiratory arrest as the cause; news about Benevides' death was first reported by Folha de S.Paulo, citing a confirmation from Benevides' cousin, Estela. According to Buenos Aires Herald, Benevides died of "cardiac arrest due to dehydration".

As the concert progressed, some fans attempted to indicate to Swift that they needed water and held signs. Swift paused her performance during the Evermore act of the show, noting the fainted audience members, and asked "whoever in charge" to dispense water to them several times during the concert. The crowds chanted "water, water" repeatedly; when stadium staff did not respond, Swift's team began distributing water bottles to the crowd. While singing "All Too Well (10 Minute Version)", around the halfway mark of the show, Swift collected a water bottle from one side of the stage and gave it to a dehydrated fan on the other side. According to firefighters' estimates, around one thousand people fainted during the event. Swift was also seen struggling to breathe on-stage between performances; while Swift had performed the same set without problems for many months up to that point, due to the extreme temperatures in the stadium, it became increasingly difficult especially for Swift and her crew. Her dancers often shed their jackets or heavier outer layers in favor of a simple bottom layer, to help them stay cool. During the second and third nights, the fire effects during "Bad Blood" were not used.

== Reactions ==
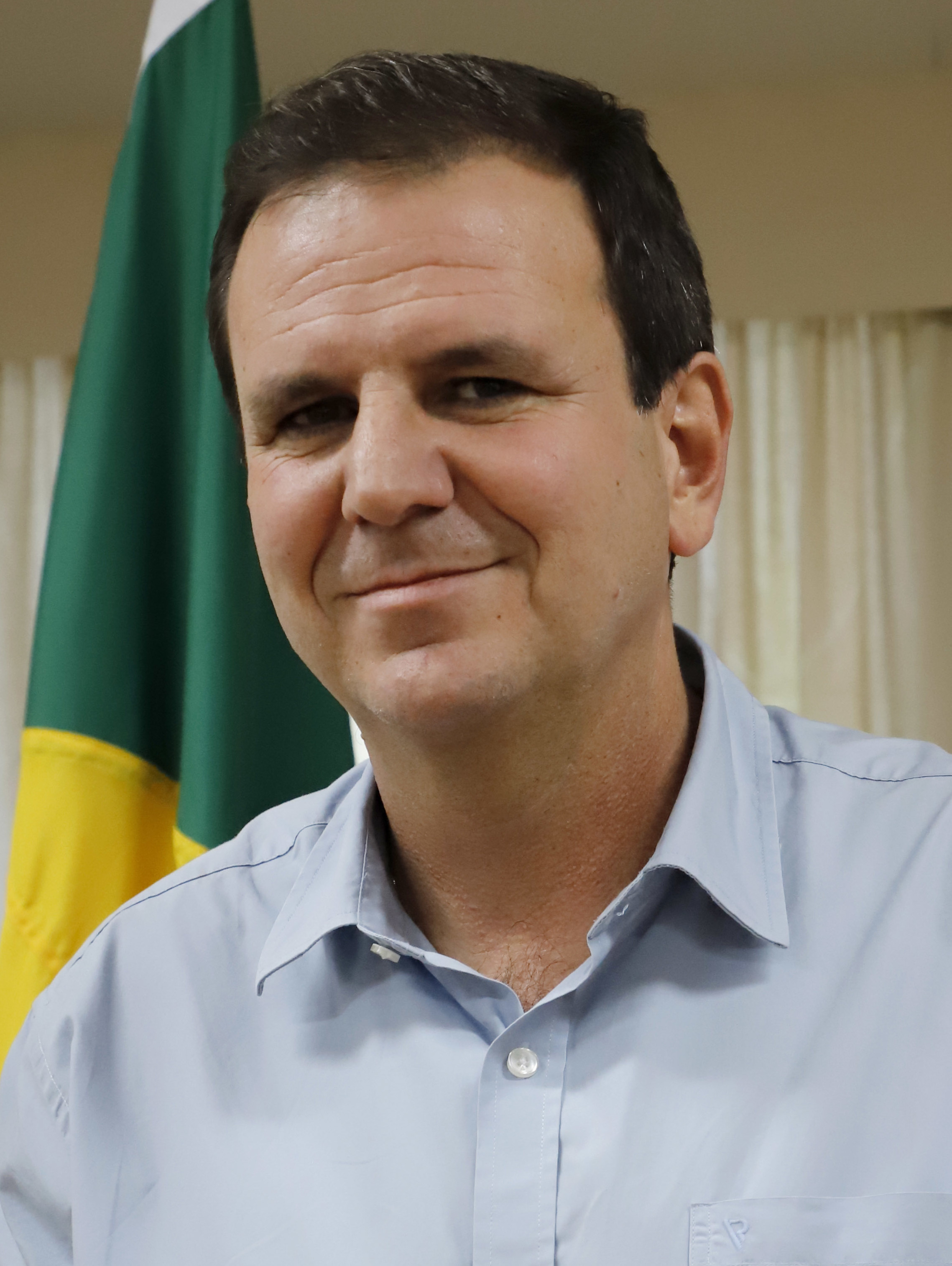
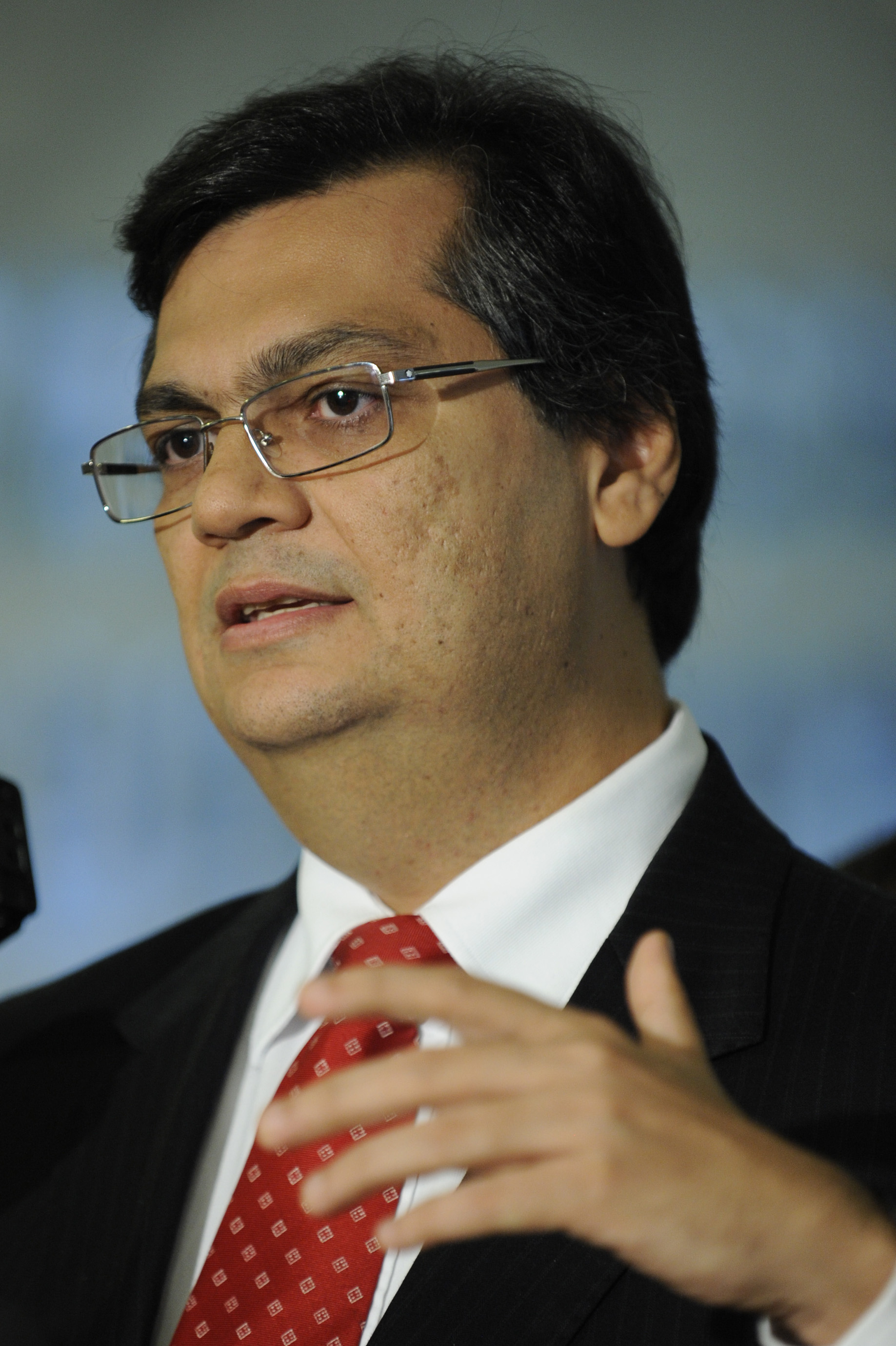
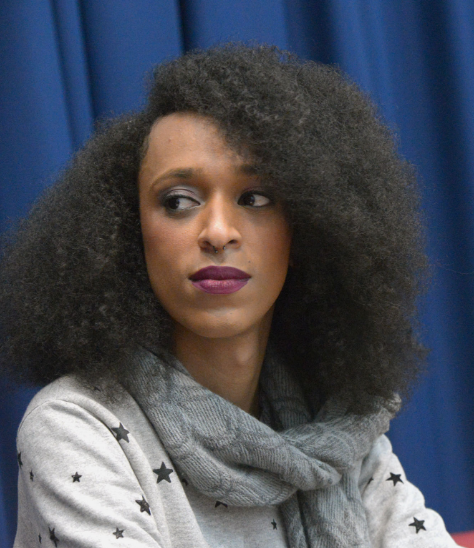
Politicians such as (from left to right) Eduardo Paes, Flávio Dino and Erika Hilton scrutinized the issue.

Following the news of the death, T4F attracted widespread criticism from concert-goers, fans, and Brazilian politicians for the mismanagement of the concert. Several fans claimed that T4F "refused" to provide concertgoers water.

=== T4F ===
On 17 November, following the news about the death of Benevides, T4F posted to social media explaining her death. In a video statement posted on 23 November, T4F CEO Serafim Abreu apologized to the concertgoers, admitting that the company "could have taken some additional measures" in response to the heat, and expressed "devastation" at Benevides' death, claiming the company is ready "to provide assistance to Benevides' family as needed". Abreu acknowledged that the company could have created shaded areas in the stadium, change the scheduled time for the shows, and emphasized that entry with water cups was allowed. T4F also said "the ban on entry of water bottles into stadiums is a requirement made by public bodies".

=== Taylor Swift ===
Swift posted on social media that she was "devastated" by the news: "I can't believe I'm writing these words but it is with a shattered heart that I say we lost a fan earlier tonight before my show. I can't even tell you how devastated I am by this [...] she was so incredibly beautiful and far too young". Swift met five people who were friends and family members of Benevides at her November 26, 2023 concert São Paulo. Swift covered travel expenses for the family members who came to meet her and made a donation to her parents. At a show in Rio de Janeiro following the incident, Swift performed an emotional rendition of her song "Bigger Than the Whole Sky" in what many fans took as a tribute to Benevides, though Swift did not mention Benevides by name. She had previously added that "I'm not going to be able to speak about this from stage because I feel overwhelmed by grief when I even try to talk about it. I want to say now I feel this loss deeply and my broken heart goes out to her family and friends. This is the last thing I ever thought would happen when we decided to bring this tour to Brazil".

=== Government ===
Brazilian federal authorities announced that "free water would be made available at all future concerts" and made "easily accessible". The minister of justice of Brazil, Flávio Dino, tweeted that the Ministry of Justice and Public Security will implement "emergency rules" regarding access to water at public events henceforth. According to CNN Brazil, the National Consumer Secretariat, an agency under the Ministry of Justice and Public Security, allowed T4F a deadline of 24 hours to provide information surrounding Benevides' death, including how the ban on access to water was reached, the availability of drinking fountains, the deployment of medical staff at the stadium, and procedures undertaken to help Benevides.

The mayor of Rio de Janeiro, Eduardo Paes, tweeted that the "loss of a young woman's life [...] is unacceptable" and stated that T4F will be demanded to "provide new water distribution points and more ambulances, and that entry be advanced by one hour". Congresswoman Erika Hilton, a PSOL member of the national Chamber of Deputies, condemned T4F and filed a complaint on the company with the Ministry of Justice and Public Security, stating that T4F should be held accountable for its "criminal" offense, and introduced a bill draft that would make free water and drinking fountains at concerts mandatory and penalize companies that deny entry to concertgoers carrying water.

=== Benevides' father ===
Benevides' father, José Weiny Machado, demanded punishment for those responsible for her death and called the water bottle ban "absurd". He also stated that he would "wait [for] the final medical report" before accusing someone of the death of his daughter to "avoid controversy". He stated that he was not contacted by T4F after the incident and that he learned of his daughter's death only from her friend via phone call.

== Aftermath ==
A group of Swifties launched an online petition on Change.org on 18 November 2023, demanding for a "Benevides Law" to "make water in events mandatory". The petition gained more than 150,000 signatures in a few hours. They also urged T4F to lift the ban on bringing water bottles in light of the "unprecedented" heat wave.

On 18 November, the original day of the second Rio de Janeiro show, T4F placed water stations within the venue grounds to cater to the concertgoers. As temperatures on 18 November were reported to be worse than the previous day, Swift postponed the 18 November show, citing "extreme temperatures". She explained that "the safety and well-being of my fans, fellow performers, and crew has to and always will come first". By Saturday morning, heat indexes at Jacarepaguá Airport were already 55 °C (131 °F). The announcement was made less than two hours prior to the scheduled start of the show, which prompted negative reactions from ticketholders already in the venue.

T4F confirmed 20 November as the new date. It marked the second time a show on the Eras Tour has been postponed that month, after the second Buenos Aires show was delayed due to thunderstorms. LATAM Airlines, Gol Linhas Aéreas, and Azul Brazilian Airlines offered ticketholders exemptions from rescheduling flight fees for the postponed Rio de Janeiro show. During her second show in Rio de Janeiro, Swift performed "Bigger Than the Whole Sky", a ballad about grief and heartache, which many fans and media interpreted as a tribute to Benevides.

During an interview for Fantástico less than two days after Benevides' death, Benevides' mother stated that neither T4F nor the municipal and state governmental bodies of Rio de Janeiro contacted her or offer financial help in transporting the body from Rio de Janeiro to Sonora and the funeral. She said that T4F only offered psychological assistance. Fans organized online donations and crowdfunding efforts and quickly covered the costs. Some fans criticized Swift for not offering financial help to Benevides' family or acknowledging her by name during the second show. On the night of the third show on 20 November, some fans planned to pay tribute to Benevides by conducting a moment of silence after the performance of "Champagne Problems", a performance which usually followed by several minutes of applause and screaming at previous shows on the tour. Before the 20 November show, Benevides' family requested the initiative to be cancelled. Benevides' body was returned to and buried in Sonora.

It was reported on 26 November 2023 that Swift and her team had contacted Benevides' parents the week prior, made donations to them, and invited them to meet Swift at her show in São Paulo. Members of Benevides' family attended the show on 26 November and met with Swift backstage. The friend who came to the 17 November show with Benevides' but did not see the performance due to Benevides' collapse also attended the 26 November show with Benevides' family.

An ordinance by the federal government of Brazil was published on 22 November 2023. It enshrined many new rules regarding event management, such as allowing attendees to enter with personal bottled water and easy access to free "hydration stations" inside venues. Subsequently, as of March 2024, over 100 municipal and state legislatures in Brazil, third of which are from the state of Rio de Janeiro, drafted or passed bills to enshrine water access into law, many of which were named after Benevides. Niterói, a city in the Greater Rio de Janeiro area, became the first municipality to pass an ordinance guaranteeing water at large events.

== Investigation ==
An autopsy report of Benevides' body was published on 20 November, which found haemorrhages in her lungs; more tests were ordered to conclusively prove her cause of death. A forensics report published on 27 December determined Benevides' cause of death to be cardiac arrest caused by heat exhaustion, and that she did not have preexisting conditions or substance abuse which could have led to her death.

On 22 November, the Civil Police department of Rio de Janeiro stated an inquiry on T4F was initiated by its consumer delegations wing for "the crime of endangering the life and health" of concertgoers. NBC News reported that T4F executives would testify, with authorities taking additional investigatory steps. Estadão added that the department would "investigate everything that fans reported, such as the structure of the place and the availability of water". Brazil's National Consumer Secretariat also launched an investigation to determine "which party, or parties, needed to be fined for violating fans' rights as consumers", and based on the evidence so far presented, "the responsible party could face up to a US$2,600,000 fine", with T4F being the prime suspect, as per secretary Wadih Damous. The secretariat focused on how T4F's water distribution and use of metal-sheet flooring were potential factors that contributed to the increase in the stadium's heat index.

== Impact ==
Benevides' death has been credited with increasing the public awareness of concert casualties. Commenting on T4F's claim that the water-bottle ban is a federally mandated rule, The Washington Post confirmed that the Ministry of Justice and Public Security "prohibits venue entry with items that can be thrown and injure a concertgoer, such as capped water bottles". Some Brazilian music festivals, including Rock in Rio, let attendees in the venue with "less hazardous capless water bottles".

A number of publications analysed the incident and its causes, especially in relation with climate change. Bloomberg News argued that Benevides' death is a sign of the inadequacy of action on climate change. Paulo Artaxo, an atmospheric physicist and member of the United Nations' Intergovernmental Panel on Climate Change, said a number of countries, including Brazil, have not implemented strategies to minimize the impact of more extreme and frequent heatwaves caused by climate change on populations. Milad Haghani, a crowd safety expert at the University of New South Wales, said the lack of assigned seating incentivized conditions which led to overcrowding in the pitch, intensifying the effects of the extreme heat, which may have resulted in more casualties had Swift not taken "quick actions" calling for organizers to distribute water.

In The Guardian, Anita Carvalho, director of the Music Rio Academy, said "I have no doubt that [the death] will be a watershed for the events industry". According to Nubia Armond, a geographer at Indiana University Bloomington, the heat is part of the Brazilian identity as a tropical country that "deals well with heat" but "there are very strong indications that this event was influenced by climate change", caused by a strong El Niño warming weather event. Armond hoped that the intensity of this heatwave "will wake up authorities and the general population to the silent danger of high temperatures and the urgency of the situation". In The Washington Post, Kristie Ebi, a professor at the University of Washington's Center for Health and the Global Environment, stated that heat-related illnesses and deaths are preventable but a "coordination among community leaders, event organizers and emergency personnel" is needed to supervise attendees and their protection, highlighting how cities such as Miami, Phoenix and Los Angeles have hired "heat officers"—personnel who are dedicated to preparing for extreme heat events. Bárbara Rodríguez, a specialist in green infrastructure at the University of Chile, told BBC News that authorities should rise to the challenges of climate change, such as adapting existing infrastructure to provide shaded zones and hydration points.

In March 2024, NBC News considered the law bills passed by Brazilian legislatures in favor of mandatory water access as "a sign Brazilian authorities have begun considering it a public health issue in an ever-hotter world" and a phenomenon galvanized by the "Taylor Swift effect". According to Beray Armond, coordinator of the Federal University of Rio de Janeiro's GeoClima laboratory, "beyond a shadow of a doubt, Benevides' death was a turning point in the issue of water distribution for Rio's public administration." In September 2026, Brazilian President Lula da Silva assented the "Taylor Swift Law" to secure access to drinking water at venues.

== See also ==
- 2023 heat waves
- 2024 Vienna terrorism plot, another incident concerning the Eras Tour in Austria
- Taylor Swift–Ticketmaster controversy, a 2022 collapse of online ticket sales of the Eras Tour in the United States
- Astroworld Festival crowd crush, a 2021 concert crowd disaster in the U.S.
