= Bigger Than the Whole Sky =

2022 song by Taylor Swift

Song by Taylor Swift

from the album Midnights (3am Edition)
- Released: October 21, 2022
- Genre: Ambient; folk
- Length: 3:38
- Label: Republic
- Songwriter: Taylor Swift
- Producers: Taylor Swift; Jack Antonoff

Lyric video
- "Bigger Than the Whole Sky" on YouTube

"Bigger Than the Whole Sky" is a song written and recorded by the American singer-songwriter Taylor Swift as a bonus track for the 3am Edition of her tenth original studio album, Midnights (2022). Produced by Swift and Jack Antonoff, "Bigger Than the Whole Sky" is a country-influenced ambient and folk ballad with ambiguous lyrics expressing grief and heartache over a person the narrator has never met.

Music critics praised Swift's songwriting and some interpreted the song to be about miscarriage. "Bigger Than the Whole Sky" charted in the top 30 of singles charts in Canada, the Philippines, and the United States. On November 19, 2023, Swift performed the song live at the Eras Tour concert in Rio de Janeiro, following the death of Ana Clara Benevides.

== Background and release ==
Taylor Swift's tenth original studio album, Midnights, was released October 21, 2022, by Republic Records. Three hours after the 13-track standard edition was released, a 3am Edition containing seven bonus tracks was surprise-released. Swift described those bonus tracks as a byproduct of her creative process while conceiving Midnights. "Bigger Than the Whole Sky" is one of the seven 3am songs, and it is track number 15 out of 20 on the listing. Swift wrote it by herself and co-produced the track with Jack Antonoff, with whom she produced the entirety of the album's standard edition.

After Swift embarked on her sixth headlining concert tour, the Eras Tour, on May 26, 2023, she released two other editions of Midnights that both feature "Bigger Than the Whole Sky": Til Dawn on streaming and download, and Late Night on concert-exclusive CDs and limited-time download. On November 19, 2023, Swift performed the song live for the first time at the Eras Tour stop in Rio de Janeiro, following the death of Ana Clara Benevides.

"Bigger Than The Whole Sky" debuted and peaked at number 21 on the US Billboard Hot 100. On the Billboard Global 200, the track reached number 22. It peaked on the singles charts of Canada (20), Hungary (31), and Portugal (68). It also charted on Billboard's Hits of the World charts for the Philippines (19) and Vietnam (60). In Australia, the track was certified gold by the Australian Recording Industry Association (ARIA).

== Composition ==
"Bigger Than the Whole Sky"
A sample of the chorus of "Bigger Than the Whole Sky", featuring an ambient production and Swift's breathy vocals

"Bigger Than the Whole Sky" is an ambient and folk ballad with elements of blues. Insider's Callie Ahlgrim and Courteney Larocca described the production as "country-tinged", and Rolling Stone's Rob Sheffield said it was a "twangy grief ballad", demonstrated by Antonoff's slide guitar, that resembled the sound of "Sad Beautiful Tragic", a song from Swift's 2012 album Red.

The lyrics are about heartache after a significant event. According to Vulture's Nate Jones, the title is a probable allusion to the writer Emily Dickinson. The song is ambiguous and does not reference what exactly was lost. The opening verse depicts the narrator in mourning, "No words appear before me in the aftermath/ Salt streams out my eyes and into my ears." In the second verse, the narrator tries to find reason for the loss and expresses her guilt, alluding to religion: "Did some bird flap its wings over in Asia?/ Did some force take you because I didn't pray?" The chorus is dedicated to someone the narrator has not met: "And I've got a lot to pine about/ I've got a lot to live without/I'm never gonna meet/ What could've been, would've been/ What should've been you." Swift uses her breathy vocals in an upper register to sing the word "goodbye" in the chorus: "Goodbye, goodbye, goodbye/You were bigger than the whole sky/You were more than just a short time."

== Critical reception ==
Upon release, many listeners shared on social media that they felt a connection to the song in relation to miscarriages that they experienced. After Swift performed it live in November 2023, Chris Willman of Variety commented that the track had become "an anthem over the last 13 months for fans who are grieving a loved one". According to People's Kelsie Gibson, some listeners felt that "Bigger Than the Whole Sky" was a continuation of Swift's 2012 charity single, "Ronan", which was dedicated to a 4-year-old boy who died of cancer. Sheffield and The Atlantic's Shirley Li described the song's tone as elegiac. The former ranked the song in the top 50 among Swift's 286 songs in her entire discography and lauded it for being "powerfully understated". Ahlgrim and Larocca commended the lyrics for portraying heartbreak with vague yet emotionally resonant lyrics that could apply to a wide range of emotional experiences.

== Cover ==
The American comedian and musician Marc Maron covered the song in his 2025 stand-up comedy special Panicked. According to Maron, he first came across the song while grieving over the death of his partner Lynn Shelton, who died in May 2020.

== Personnel ==
Credits are adapted from Tidal.

- Taylor Swift – vocals, songwriter, producer
- Jack Antonoff – producer, recording, programming, bass, synthesizer, slide guitar, acoustic guitar, electric guitar, piano
- Serban Ghenea – mixing
- Bryce Bordone – assistant mixing
- Laura Sisk – recording
- Jon Sher – assistant recording
- John Rooney – assistant recording
- Lauren Marquez – additional engineer
- Megan Searl – assistant recording
- Randy Merrill – mastering

== Charts ==
Chart performance for "Bigger Than the Whole Sky"
Chart (2022)	Peak position
Canada Hot 100 (Billboard)	20
Global 200 (Billboard)	22
Greece International (IFPI)	65
Hungary (Single Top 40)	31
Philippines (Billboard)	19
Portugal (AFP)	68
Sweden Heatseeker (Sverigetopplistan)	13
UK Audio Streaming (Official Charts)	35
UK Singles Downloads (Official Charts)	9
UK Singles Sales (OCC)	12
US Billboard Hot 100	21
Vietnam Hot 100 (Billboard)	60

== Certifications ==
Certifications for "Bigger Than the Whole Sky"
Region	Certification	Certified units/sales
Australia (ARIA)	Gold	35,000^{‡}
New Zealand (RMNZ)	Gold	15,000^{‡}
United Kingdom (BPI)	Silver	200,000^{‡}
^{‡} Sales+streaming figures based on certification alone.
