= CPX (Brazil) =

Abbreviation for the Rio de Janeiro favelas

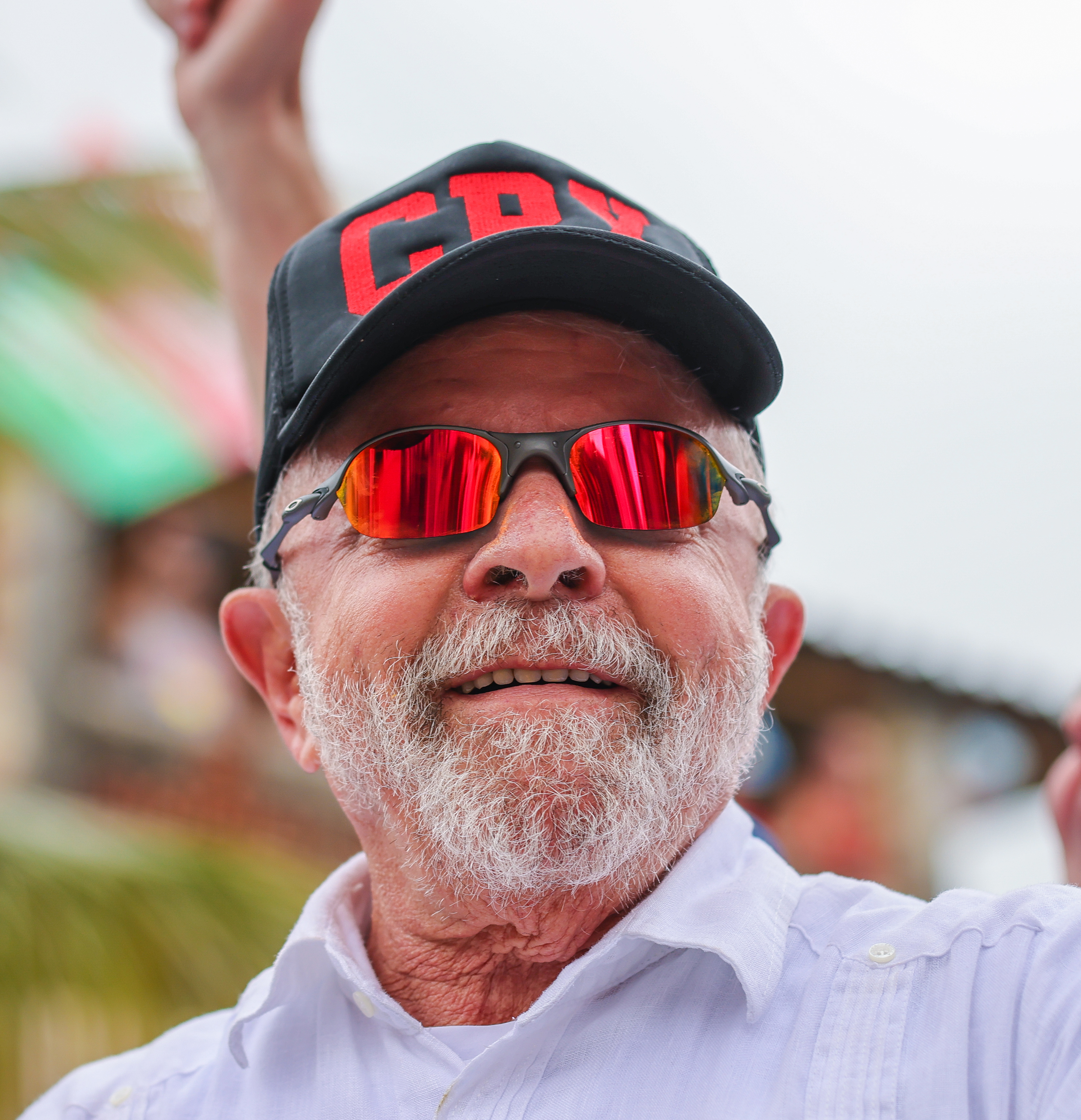
Lula wearing a cap with the initials "CPX" during an election campaign in a favela in Rio de Janeiro.

CPX is an abbreviation of the word "Complexo", used to refer to the favela complexes in Rio de Janeiro, Brazil. The acronym gained national notoriety during the second round of the 2022 presidential election, after then-candidate Luiz Inácio Lula da Silva (PT) wore a cap emblazoned with the term during a campaign rally in Complexo do Alemão. Following the backlash from the incident, allies of Jair Bolsonaro began circulating posts that linked the acronym to organized crime, an interpretation disputed by fact-checking organizations and media outlets.

In October 2022, the Superior Electoral Court (TSE) ordered the removal of posts that linked Lula and residents of low-income communities to a distorted interpretation of the term, on the grounds that the posts spread misinformation.

The controversy sparked a sudden surge in demand for the caps, which came to be worn by Lula's supporters throughout the campaign and became a political symbol during his inauguration as Brazil's 39th president.

== Origin and use of the acronym ==
The use of CPX as an abbreviation for the word "Complexo" dates back to social media, where it was used informally to simplify writing and save characters when referring to groups of favelas and urban communities in Rio de Janeiro, such as Complexo da Penha, Complexo Lemos de Brito, and Complexo do São Carlos.

PMERJ
(@PMERJ)
tweeted:

Portuguese:

O comando da UPP Vila Cruzeiro, Cpx da Penha, informa que houve um curto-circuito no ar-condicionado de um dos alojamentos (+) #TodosBem

Translation:

The command of the Vila Cruzeiro UPP, "Cpx da Penha", reports that there was a short circuit in the air conditioning unit of one of the barracks (+) #EveryoneIsFine

January 11, 2017

Even before the 2022 presidential election, the acronym had already appeared in official publications by public agencies in the state of Rio de Janeiro. In a 2017 tweet, the Military Police of Rio de Janeiro State (PMERJ) Twitter account mentioned "CPX da Penha" when reporting a short circuit at a barracks of the Pacifying Police Unit in Vila Cruzeiro, on the city's outskirts. Meanwhile, in the summary of Rio's 2023 Budget Guidelines Law, the term "CPX da Maré" was used to refer to the Complexo da Maré.

According to activist and journalist Rene Silva, founder of the community newspaper Voz das Comunidades in the outskirts of Rio, the acronym also gained popularity in the context of the funk movement and the dance parties held in Rio's communities during the 1990s and 2000s. The term appears in musical works of the genre, such as the songs released as part of the Poesia Acústica project.

In the 2022 election, allies of Jair Bolsonaro (PL) linked CPX to a distorted meaning of the term "cupincha", sometimes misspelled as "cupinxa", which means 'friend' or "comrade", according to the Michaelis Dictionary of the Portuguese Language.

== Election misinformation and public reaction ==
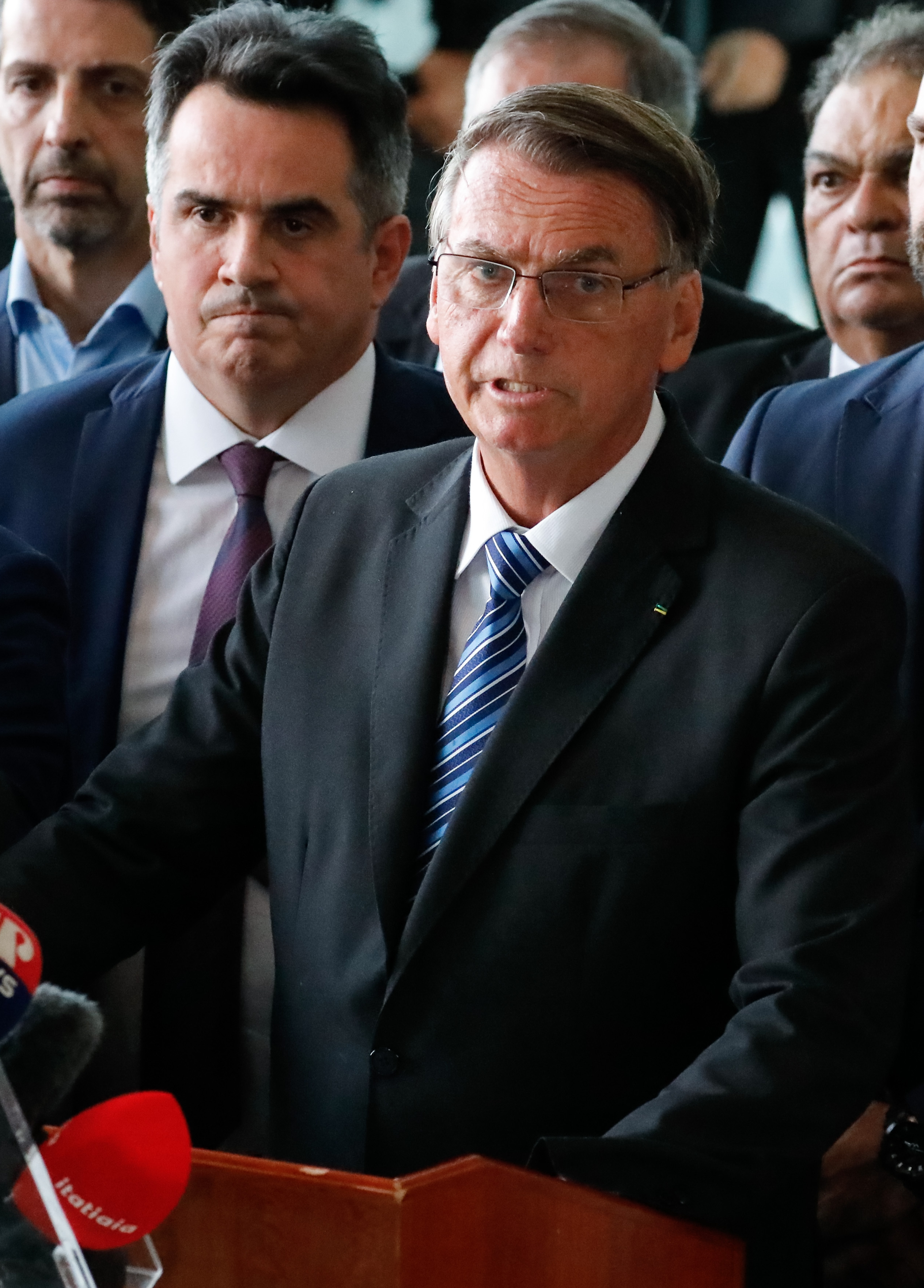
Jair Bolsonaro's posts and statements regarding the CPX party were the subject of rulings by the Superior Electoral Court (TSE) during the 2022 elections.

Following Lula's visit to the Complexo do Alemão, allies of Jair Bolsonaro took to social media to link the party's acronym to the term "cupincha", an expression misleadingly presented as a reference to criminal groups and drug traffickers linked to organized crime in Rio de Janeiro. The association was later amplified by Bolsonaro's own social media accounts, as well as by his then-running mate, Walter Braga Netto, and by lawmakers such as Flávio Bolsonaro, Carla Zambelli, and Nikolas Ferreira, among others.

Later, during a campaign event in Piauí, Jair Bolsonaro once again mocked the PT candidate's visit to the Complexo do Alemão. In his speech, he alluded to the controversy by claiming that Lula had governed for "friends, cronies and CPX" and also called his opponent a "liar", "spineless" and "thief."

During a debate hosted by TV Globo in Rio de Janeiro during the second round of the elections, Jair Bolsonaro referred to the incident by claiming that Lula had gone to meet with "drug lords" and that in the Complexo do Alemão "no one goes in there without the police." In response, the phrase "Favelado não é bandido" ("People from the favelas aren't criminals") became one of the most talked-about topics on Twitter, with posts by Rene Silva gaining media attention after the activist described the presidential candidate's stance as "criminal." For him, having lived in Alemão, the former president's remarks reinforced stigmas against residents and ignored the community-oriented nature of Lula's visit, which was organized by leaders from the periphery.

== Court decisions ==
In October 2022, Justice Paulo de Tarso Sanseverino of the Superior Electoral Court (TSE) ordered the removal of posts linking CPX to criminal factions and drug trafficking, in response to a request from Lula's campaign. In the justice's view, the posts went beyond the bounds of political debate by spreading misinformation capable of influencing the electoral process.

In explaining the decision, Sanseverino stated that the content spread false and negative information that was widely shared, creating, in his view, a form of "sensationalism" capable of compromising the integrity of the electoral process and violating constitutional principles related to citizenship and the freedom of the vote. Among other grounds, he cited regulations aimed at protecting the honor of candidates, combating misinformation, and ensuring the integrity of the electoral process.

In February 2025, the 6th Electoral Court of São Paulo accepted a complaint filed by the Electoral Prosecutor's Office against federal deputy and actor Mário Frias for spreading electoral misinformation during the 2022 presidential campaign. The complaint was based on a post in which Frias published a photo of Lula wearing a cap and associated CPX with the term "cupinxa" and organized crime. The content was part of a series of posts promoted by allies of Jair Bolsonaro and later removed by order of the Superior Electoral Court. If convicted, Mário Frias could be barred from running for office and lose his seat.

== Symbol and demand for caps ==
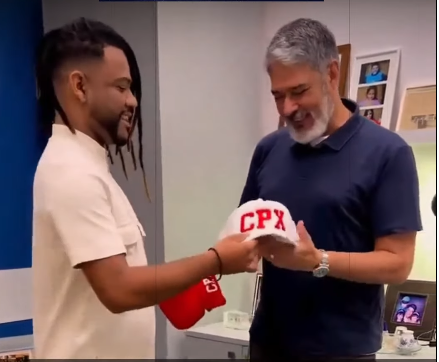
William Bonner receives merchandise featuring the CPX logo during a visit to Complexo do Alemão.

Following the political fallout and explanations regarding the true meaning of CPX, the manufacturers of the cap worn by Lula saw a sudden surge in demand for the product. According to reports, orders began pouring in from different regions of Brazil, leading to an increase in staff and extended production hours into the early hours of the morning.

Due to high demand, Rene Silva organized a food drive in exchange for the caps, an initiative that, with the support of social organizations and artists, resulted in the donation of more than 3,000 food baskets to families in Rio de Janeiro's favelas.

In November 2022, British Formula One driver Lewis Hamilton was presented with the cap.

The item then began to be worn by Lula's supporters and established itself as a political symbol, appearing at public events, the 2023 presidential inauguration, and in appearances by artists and public figures. In 2023, during a visit to Complexo do Alemão, journalist William Bonner, then anchor of TV Globo's Jornal Nacional, received a cap and a T-shirt emblazoned with "CPX" as a gift. At the time, Bonner said he was moved by the gift and highlighted the symbolic and historical significance the item had acquired in the Brazilian political and media landscape.

== See also ==
- 2022 Brazilian general election
