= José Reis Pereira =

Brazilian politician (1943–2023)

Member of the Legislative Assembly of Piauí
- In office 1987–1991

Personal details
- Born: 10 December 1943; São João do Piauí, Brazil
- Died: 25 January 2023 (aged 79)
- Political party: PMDB; PSDB
- Occupation: Teacher

José Reis Pereira (10 December 1943 – 25 January 2023) was a Brazilian teacher and politician. A member of the Brazilian Democratic Movement Party and the Brazilian Social Democracy Party, he served in the Legislative Assembly of Piauí from 1987 to 1991.

Pereira died on 25 January 2023, at the age of 79.
