= Alzira Rufino =

Brazilian feminist and activist (1949–2023)

Alzira Rufino (6 July 1949 – 26 April 2023) was a Brazilian feminist and activist who was associated with the Black Movement and the Black Women's Movement. She was the founder of the Casa de Cultura da Mulher Negra (Black Women's House of Culture), the country's first black women's center.

Rufino was born in Santos, São Paulo to a low-income family and worked as a child. She won her first literary prize in her youth. At age 19, she began her studies in healthcare, later graduating from nursing school.

In 2005, she was one of 52 Brazilian women nominated for the 1000 Women Project for the Nobel Peace Prize 2005.

Rufino was a leader in the Afro-Brazilian literature and cultural arts movement. In 1990, she founded Casa de Cultura da Mulher Negra (Black Women's House of Culture), the country's first black women's centre.

Rufino died in Santos on 26 April 2023, at the age of 73.

== Selected works ==
- Violência Doméstica e Racial
- Direitos Humanos das Mulheres Negras
- Educação Anti-racista
- Comunicação
- Cultura Afro-brasileira
