= Lucia Hippolito =

Brazilian journalist (1950–2023)

Maria Lucia Pereira Hippolito (29 June 1950 – 21 June 2023) was a Brazilian political scientist, journalist, historian, columnist and commentator. She presented the daily radio program "CBN Rio" from 2008, and commented on politics in the same radio from 2002. She also commented at UOL News and Globo News. She used to debate at the programs "Sem Censura" from TVE/Rede Brasil and "Debates Populares" from Rádio Globo Am-Rio.

== Biography ==
Lucia Hippolito was part of the team of women who debated at the weekly debate "As Meninas do Jô", aired during the Programa do Jô from 2005 to 2010. The other debaters were Lilian Witte Fibe, Cristiana Lôbo and Ana Maria Tahan. She was also chief of cabinet of the Presidency of the Instituto Brasileiro de Geografia e Estatística (IBGE).

Hippolito published many books about politics. PSD de Raposas e Reformistas (PSD of Foxes and Reformists) was published by Editora Paz e Terra and awarded the Best Book of Political Science by the Associação Nacional de Pesquisa e Pós-Graduação em Ciências Sociais (ANPOCS, Portuguese for National Association of Research and Post-Graduation at Social Science). Política. Quem faz, quem manda, quem obedece (Politics. Who makes it, who orders, who obeys) was written with João Ubaldo Ribeiro and published via Editora Nova Fronteira. Por dentro do governo Lula. Anotações num diário de bordo (Inside Lula's Government. Notes on a logbook) was published by Editora Futura.

Hippolito was married to professor Edgar Flexa Ribeiro, owner and director of Colégio Andrews, president of Academia Brasileira de Educação (Brazilian Academy of Education) and ex-president of Sindicato dos Estabelecimentos de Ensino Particular do Rio de Janeiro.

Hippolito died on 21 June 2023, at the age of 72.

== Awards ==
Lucia was awarded twice Comunique-se Award in the category Political Journalism ion Electronic Media, in 2007 and 2009. In 2008 she earned the award Woman of the Year in the Media, granted by the Conselho Nacional de Mulheres do Brasil (National Council of Women of Brazil). She was also awarded the Woman Press Trophy 2010 at the category Commentator or Columnist in Radio. She earned the award five times.
