= Apyterewa Indigenous Territory =

Indigenous territory in Brazil

- Terra Indígena Apyterewa
- Location within Brazil
- Location: São Félix do Xingu, Pará
- Coordinates: 5°39′00″S 52°00′35″W
- Area: 773,470 ha (1,911,300 acres)
- Designation: Indigenous territory

The Apyterewa Indigenous Territory is an indigenous territory located in the Brazilian state of Pará. Regularized and traditionally occupied, it has an area of 773,470 hectares and had a population of 452 people in 2010, mainly consisting of the Parakanã people.

In the period 2020–2021, T.I. Apytere was the one that suffered the most deforestation in Brazil.
