= November 3, 2023 Brazil storm =

Severe weather event in Southeastern Brazil

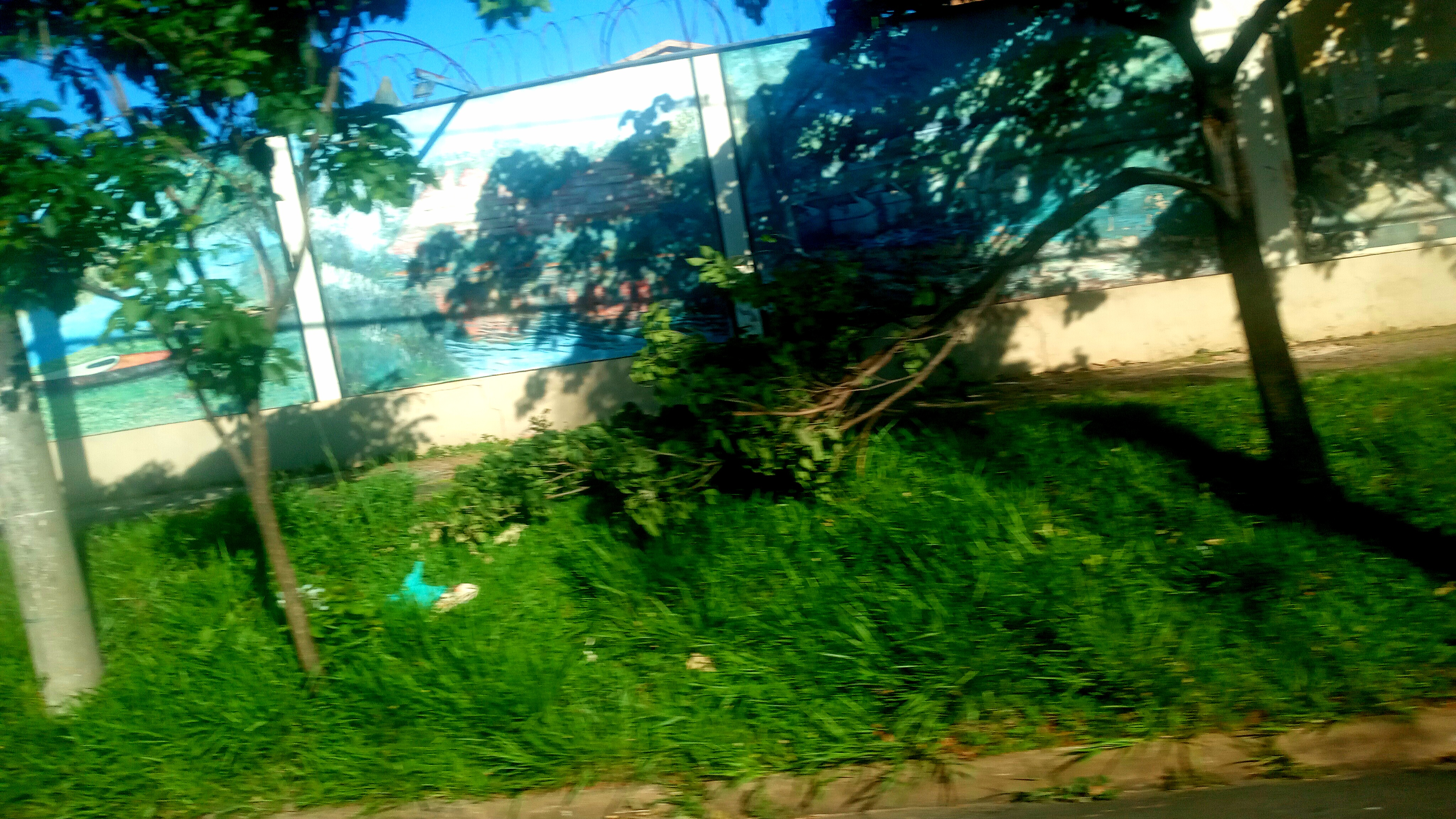
- Damaged tree in Piracicaba, São Paulo

Meteorological history
- Formed: November 3, 2023

Squall line
- Highest gusts: 150 km/h (90 mph)

Overall effects
- Fatalities: 8
- Areas affected: Brazil (São Paulo, Minas Gerais and Rio de Janeiro states)

The November 3, 2023, Brazil storm was an extreme and historical event that struck several cities in Southeastern Brazil, especially those in the state of São Paulo, on the afternoon of November 3, 2023. It was caused by a strong cold front's squall line, which generated powerful winds reaching 151 km/h in Santos and resulted in at least eight deaths. In the state of São Paulo as a whole, more than 4 million customers were left without electricity, making this event the second worst storm-related disaster for the power grid in Brazil, surpassed only by the June 2020 Southern Brazil bomb cyclone.
