= Álvaro Correia =

Brazilian politician (1933–2023)

Member of the Legislative Assembly of Santa Catarina
- In office 1975–1987

Personal details
- Born: 7 March 1933; Itajaí, Santa Catarina, Brazil
- Died: 12 October 2023 (aged 90); Blumenau, Santa Catarina, Brazil
- Political party: MDB
- Occupation: Journalist

Álvaro Correia (7 March 1933 – 12 October 2023) was a Brazilian journalist and politician. A member of the Brazilian Democratic Movement, he served in the Legislative Assembly of Santa Catarina from 1975 to 1987.

Correia died in Blumenau on 12 October 2023, at the age of 90.
