= Palmério Dória =

Brazilian journalist (1948–2023)

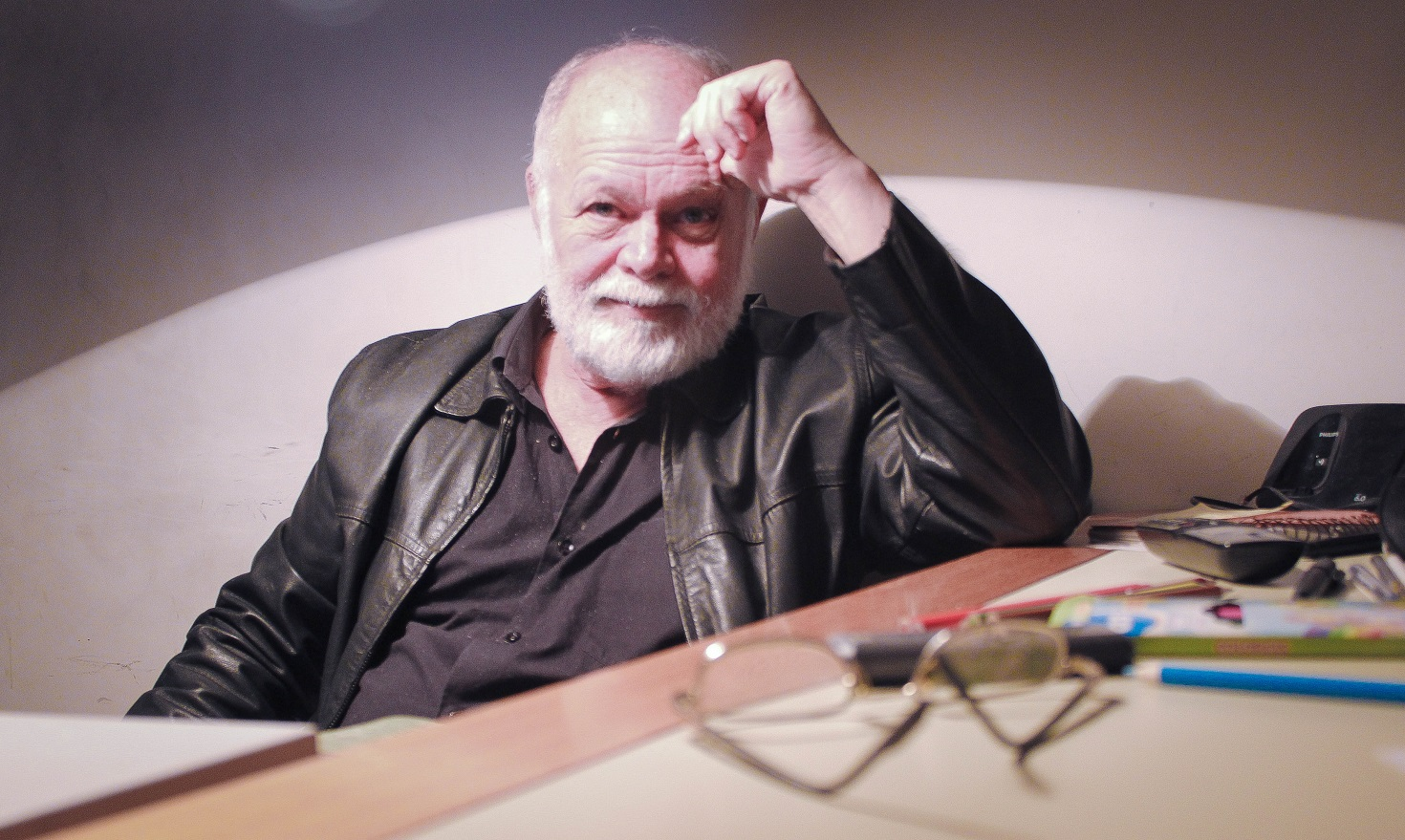
- Dória in 2013
- Born: 1948; Santarém, Pará, Brazil
- Died: 31 March 2023 (aged 74); São Paulo, Brazil
- Occupation(s): Journalist, author

Palmério Dória (1948 – 31 March 2023) was a Brazilian journalist and writer, director of Sexy magazine and author of a number of books.

Dória was born in Santarém and raised in Belém by a priest. He moved to the South of Brazil and started working as a journalist, working at press vehicles such as Folha de S.Paulo, O Estado de S. Paulo and Caros Amigos magazine. He was chief-of-reportage of Rede Globo until 1992, when he took over Sexy magazine.

Dória died of sepsis in São Paulo on 31 March 2023, at the age of 74.

== Books ==
Dória published, among others, the following books:

- Mataram o Presidente – Memórias do pistoleiro que mudou a História do Brasil (1976; translates as "They Killed the President – Memoirs of the gunman who changed the history of Brazil), which deals with the historical moment started with Getúlio Vargas suicide;
- A Guerrilha do Araguaia (1978; translates as "Araguaia Guerrilla"), a report on the communist reaction quelled by the Brazilian military dictatorship.
- Evasão de Privacidade (2001; translates as "Evasion of Privacy"), which compiles a number of interviews with famous women published on Sexy magazine.
- A candidata que virou picolé (2002; translates as "The candidate that turned into ice pop"), which reports the brief candidacy of Roseana Sarney for president.
- Honoráveis Bandidos ─ Um Retrato do Brasil na Era Sarney (2009; translates as Honorable Criminals – A picture of Brazil during Sarney Era), about the power of the Sarney family on the Brazilian state of Maranhão.
- O Príncipe da Privataria – a história secreta de como o Brasil perdeu seu patrimônio e Fernando Henrique Cardoso ganhou sua reeleição (Geração Editorial, 2013; translates as "The Prince of Privatary – the secret history of how Brazil lost its patrimony and Fernando Henrique Cardoso won his reelection), about the FHC era.
