= Albeneir =

Brazilian footballer (1957 – 2023)

Personal information
- Full name: Albeneir Marques Pereira
- Date of birth: 9 September 1957
- Place of birth: Baldim, Brazil
- Date of death: 15 June 2023 (aged 65)
- Place of death: Biguaçu, Brazil
- Height: 1.98 m (6 ft 6 in)
- Position: Forward

Youth career
- –1976: Cruzeiro

Senior career*
Years	Team	Apps	(Gls)
1976	Cruzeiro		
1977	ESAB		
1978	Brasília		
1978	Nacional-AM		
1979	Operário-MS		
1980–1981	Brasília		
1981	Figueirense		
1982	Matsubara		
1982	Atlético Paranaense		
1982–1984	Figueirense		
1984	Joinville		
1984	Grêmio		
1985	Figueirense		
1986	Grêmio		
1986	Goiás		
1986	Novorizontino		
1987	Inter de Limeira		
1987	Figueirense		
1987	Novorizontino		
1988	Figueirense		
1988	Aimoré		
1989	Figueirense		
1989	Aimoré		
1990	Grêmio Maringá		
1990	Glória		
1991	Marcílio Dias		
1991	Avaí		
1992	Figueirense		
1992	Avaí		
- * Club domestic league appearances and goals as of 23 February 2024

Albeneir Marques Pereira (9 September 1957 – 15 July 2023), simply known as Albeneir, was a Brazilian professional footballer who played as a forward.

== Career ==
Having started his career at Cruzeiro EC, Albeneir became a ball carrier, playing for clubs in different regions of Brazil. He achieved greater identification with Figueirense FC, where he made 221 appearances and scored 93 goals, 23 of which in 1983 when he was Santa Catarina's top scorer.

== Death ==
Albeneir died in the city of Biguaçu, 15 June 2023, victim of a stroke.

== Honours ==
Brasília

- Campeonato Brasiliense: 1978

Operário-MS

- Campeonato Sul-Mato-Grossense: 1979

Figueirense

- Taça Mané Garrincha: 1983

Grêmio

- Campeonato Gaúcho: 1986

Individual

- 1983 Campeonato Catarinense top scorer: 23 goals
