= José Elias Moreira =

Brazilian politician (1940–2023)

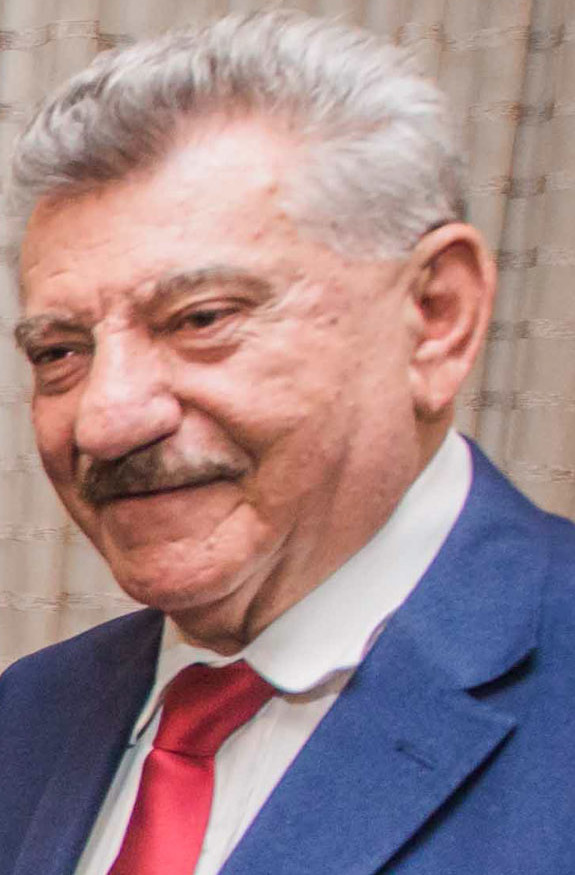
- Moreira in 2017

Member of the Chamber of Deputies of Brazil for Mato Grosso do Sul
- In office 22 September 1988 – 31 January 1995

Personal details
- Born: 20 July 1940; Poços de Caldas, Brazil
- Died: 15 March 2023 (aged 82); São Paulo, Brazil
- Political party: PTB
- Education: Federal Rural University of Rio de Janeiro
- Occupation: Businessman

José Elias Moreira (20 July 1940 – 15 March 2023) was a Brazilian businessman and politician. A member of the Brazilian Labour Party, he served in the Chamber of Deputies from 1988 to 1995.

Moreira died in São Paulo on 15 March 2023, at the age of 82.
