= Claudio Willer =

Brazilian writer and poet (1940–2023)

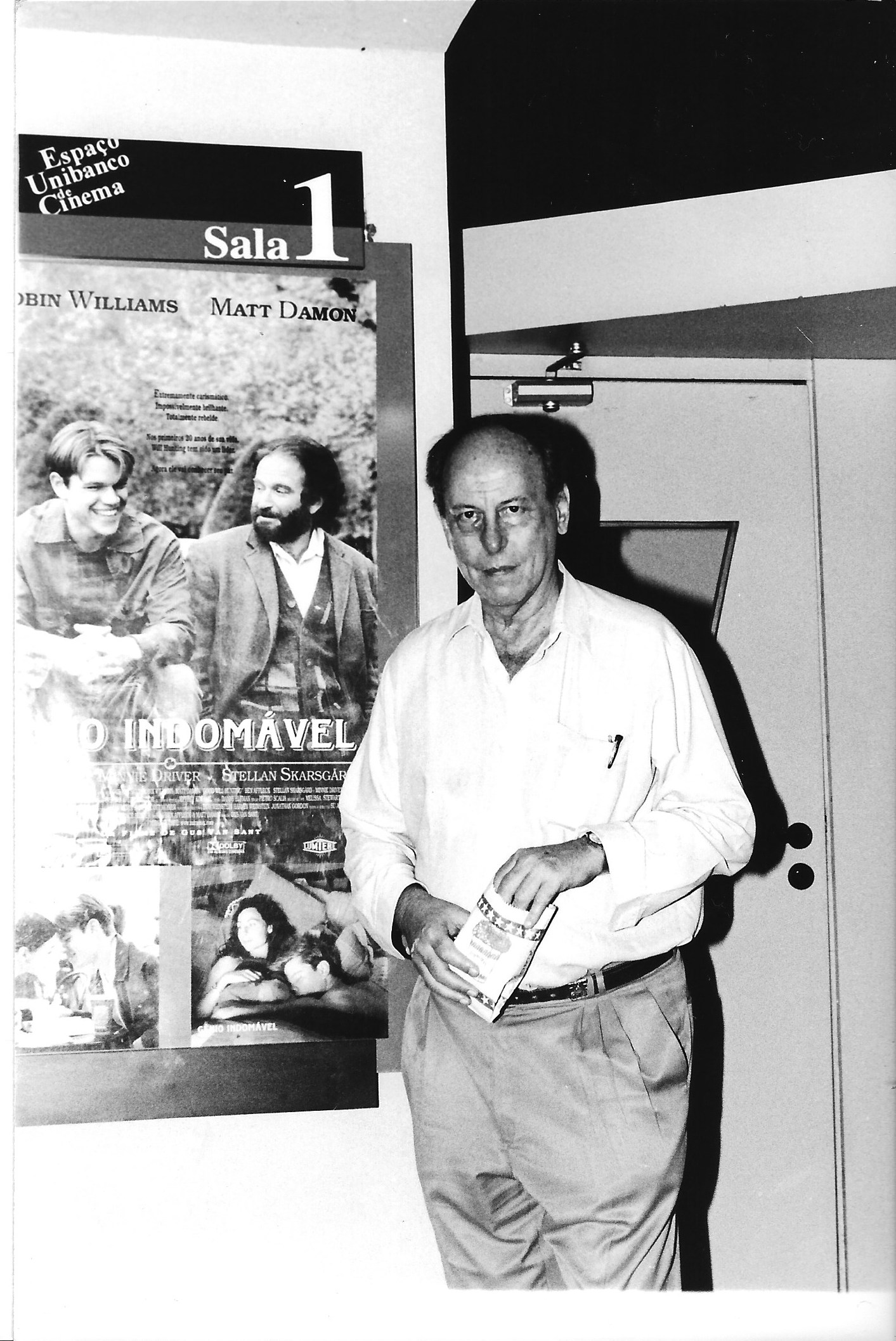
- Born: Claudio Jorge Willer; 2 December 1940; São Paulo, São Paulo, Brazil
- Died: 13 January 2023 (aged 82); São Paulo, São Paulo, Brazil
- Occupations: Poet, translator, essayist, critic

Claudio Jorge Willer (2 December 1940 – 13 January 2023) was a Brazilian poet, translator, essayist and critic.

== Life and career ==
Of German Jewish descent, Willer graduated in psychology, from University of São Paulo (USP) (1966), and in Social and Political Sciences, from Fundação Escola de Sociologia e Política de São Paulo (1963), and received his PhD in literature, from USP, in the area of Comparative Studies of Portuguese Language Literatures, with the thesis Um Obscuro Encanto: Gnose, Gnosticismo e a Poesia Moderna, approved with distinction on 28 March 2008. He completed post-doctoral studies in 2011, also in literature at USP, with essays on the theme "Strange Religions, Mysticism and Poetry".

His poetic output stands out for its connection with surrealism and the Beat Generation. Willer also worked as a translator, translating works by Lautréamont, Antonin Artaud, Allen Ginsberg and Jack Kerouac to Portuguese. Along with Sergio Lima and Roberto Piva, he was one of the few Brazilian poets mentioned in a review on surrealism in São Paulo, published in February 1965 by the French periodical La Bréche - Action Surréaliste, directed by André Breton.

As a critic and essayist, he wrote for several Brazilian newspapers: Jornal da Tarde, Jornal do Brasil (section Ideias), Folha de S. Paulo, O Estado de S. Paulo, Correio Braziliense, Isto É and Cult magazines, and for alternative and independent press publications: Versus newspaper, Singular and Plural magazine, O Escritor da UBE newspaper, Linguagem Viva, Muito Mais, Página Central, Reserva Cultural (cinema), and others.

Willer died from bladder cancer in São Paulo, on 13 January 2023, at the age of 82.

== Selected works ==
=== Poetry ===
- Anotações para um apocalipse. São Paulo: Massao Ohno Editor, 1964.
- Dias circulares. São Paulo: Massao Ohno Editor, 1976.
- Jardins da Provocação. São Paulo: Massao Ohno/Roswitha Kempf Editores, 1981.
- Estranhas Experiências, Rio de Janeiro: Lamparina, 2004.
- Poemas para leer en voz alta, poesia, translated by Eva Schnell, postfaceby Floriano Martins, Editorial Andrómeda, San José, Costa Rica, 2007.
- A verdadeira história do século XX, poesia, Lisboa, Portugal: Apenas Livros – Cadernos Surrealistas Sempre, 2015; Brazilian edition: São Paulo, Córrego, 2016.
- Extrañas experiencias, poesia 1964-2004, Claudio Willer, Nulu Bonsai Editora, Buenos Aires, 2018; translated by Thiago Souza Pimentel, photography by Irupê Tenório, prologue and review by Reynaldo Jiménez. With support from the Brazilian Ministry of External Relations Argentine edition of Estranhas experiências.

=== Prose and essay ===
- Dias ácidos, noites lisérgicas, crônicas, São Paulo: Córrego, 2019.
- "Os rebeldes: Geração Beat e anarquismo místico, ensaio", Porto Alegre: L&PM, 2014.
- "Manifestos 1964-2010", Rio de Janeiro: Azougue editorial, 2013.
- Volta, narrativa em prosa, São Paulo: Iluminuras, 1996 (3ª edição: 2004).
- Geração Beat. Porto Alegre: L&PM Pocket (coleção Encyclopaedia), 2009.
- Um obscuro encanto: gnose, gnosticismo e a poesia moderna. Rio de Janeiro: Civilização Brasileira, 2010.
