= Walter Tosta =

Brazilian politician (1956–2023)

Member of the Chamber of Deputies of Brazil
- In office 2011–2015

Member of the Legislative Assembly of Minas Gerais
- In office 2007–2011

Personal details
- Born: Walter da Rocha Tosta; 20 October 1956 Rio de Janeiro, Brazil
- Died: 8 January 2023 (aged 66)
- Party: PR

Walter da Rocha Tosta (20 October 1956 – 8 January 2023) was a Brazilian politician. A member of the Party of the Republic, he served in the Chamber of Deputies from 2011 to 2015.

Tosta died on 8 January 2023, at the age of 66.
