= Gilmara Sanches =

Brazilian actress (1943–2023)

- Born: 15 June 1943; São Paulo, Brazil
- Died: 29 March 2023 (aged 79); São Paulo, Brazil
- Occupation: Actress

Gilmara Sanches (born Maria Aparecida Sánchez; 15 June 1943 – 29 March 2023) was a Brazilian actress.

== Life and career ==
Born in São Paulo, the sister of actress Elaine Cristina, Sanches began her career as a child radio actress when she was just 11 years old. In the 1960s and 1970s she starred in several TV Record telenovelas, and appeared in the TV show Show de Calouros.

In the following decades Gilmara dedicated herself to dubbing, being best known as the voice of Eagle Marin in Saint Seiya, Lois Lane in Superman: The Animated Series and Sailor Mercury in Sailor Moon. She also served as dubbing director for several animated series, such as Pokémon and Teenage Mutant Ninja Turtles. Gilmara died on 29 March 2023, at the age of 79.
