= 2023 South America heat wave =

Heat wave hit in South America

Between July and November 2023, a heat wave hit South America, leading to temperatures in many areas above 95 °F (35 °C) in midwinter, often 40–45 °F (22–25 °C) degrees above typical. The heat wave was especially severe in northern Argentina and Chile, along neighboring areas in and around the Andes Mountains. Some locations set all-time heat records. Several states also had the hottest September temperatures in history, often reaching more than 40 °C (104 °F).

In mid-July, Brazil began experiencing elevated temperatures. During the third week of the month, locations in Argentina, Bolivia, Paraguay, and Uruguay set records for July temperatures. There was a heat dome above Paraguay associated with the unusual weather, which was also exacerbated by El Niño and global warming.

Weather historian Maximiliano Herrera stated that "South America is living one of the extreme events the world has ever seen" and "This event is rewriting all climatic books".

On 1 August 2023, Buenos Aires broke a 117 year heat record. Chile saw highs towards 40 °C and Bolivia saw unseasonably high temperatures, while Asunción saw 33 °C.

A heat wave in Brazil started in central and western regions on 7 November, when temperatures reached 42 °C in Mato Grosso do Sul. Over the next few days, it grew in size and intensity, affecting all regions of Brazil, especially the central and central regions: West, Northeast and Southeast.

Mato Grosso do Sul and Minas Gerais have recorded the highest temperatures during the heat wave. The temperatures in both states have exceeded 43 °C for many consecutive days, mainly between 12 and 19 November 2023. The highest temperature observed in the city of Araçuaí in the Vale do Jequitinhonha of Minas Gerais on the 19th was 44.8 °C, which was the highest temperature in Brazil recorded by INMET.

Brazil experienced three other severe heat waves in August, September, and October, but in November the heat wave was more comprehensive and intense and was determined by MetSul Meteorologia to be the worst in Brazilian history.

== Impact ==
On 17 November 2023, around a thousand people fainted during a show of American singer Taylor Swift's The Eras Tour, held at the Nilton Santos Olympic Stadium, in Rio de Janeiro. Student Ana Clara Benevides Machado suffered a cardiorespiratory arrest and died during the concert. On 18 November, the Eras Tour concert scheduled for that night was postponed until 20 November.
