= Mãe Bernadete =

Brazilian activist (1951–2023)

Maria Bernadete Pacífico (1951 – 17 August 2023), also known as Mãe Bernadete, was a Brazilian ialorixá, community activist, politician and quilombo leader. She was the leader of the Pitanga dos Palmares quilombo, an Afro-Brazilian autonomous settlement founded by enslaved Africans in Simões Filho, Bahia in the Northeast Region of Brazil. On August 17, 2023, Bernadete was murdered by two men who entered her home, shooting her more than 12 times in her face in front of her grandchildren. She was the coordinator of Brazil's national council of quilombos (CONAQ), the former Minister for Racial Equality of Simões Filho. She had been placed on Brazil's Human Rights Defenders Protection Program (HRDPP) in 2017 because of threats to her life following the murder of her son, Flavio Gabriel Pacífico dos Santos, better known as Binho do Quilombo.
