= Kristie Ebi =

American epidemiologist (born 1941)

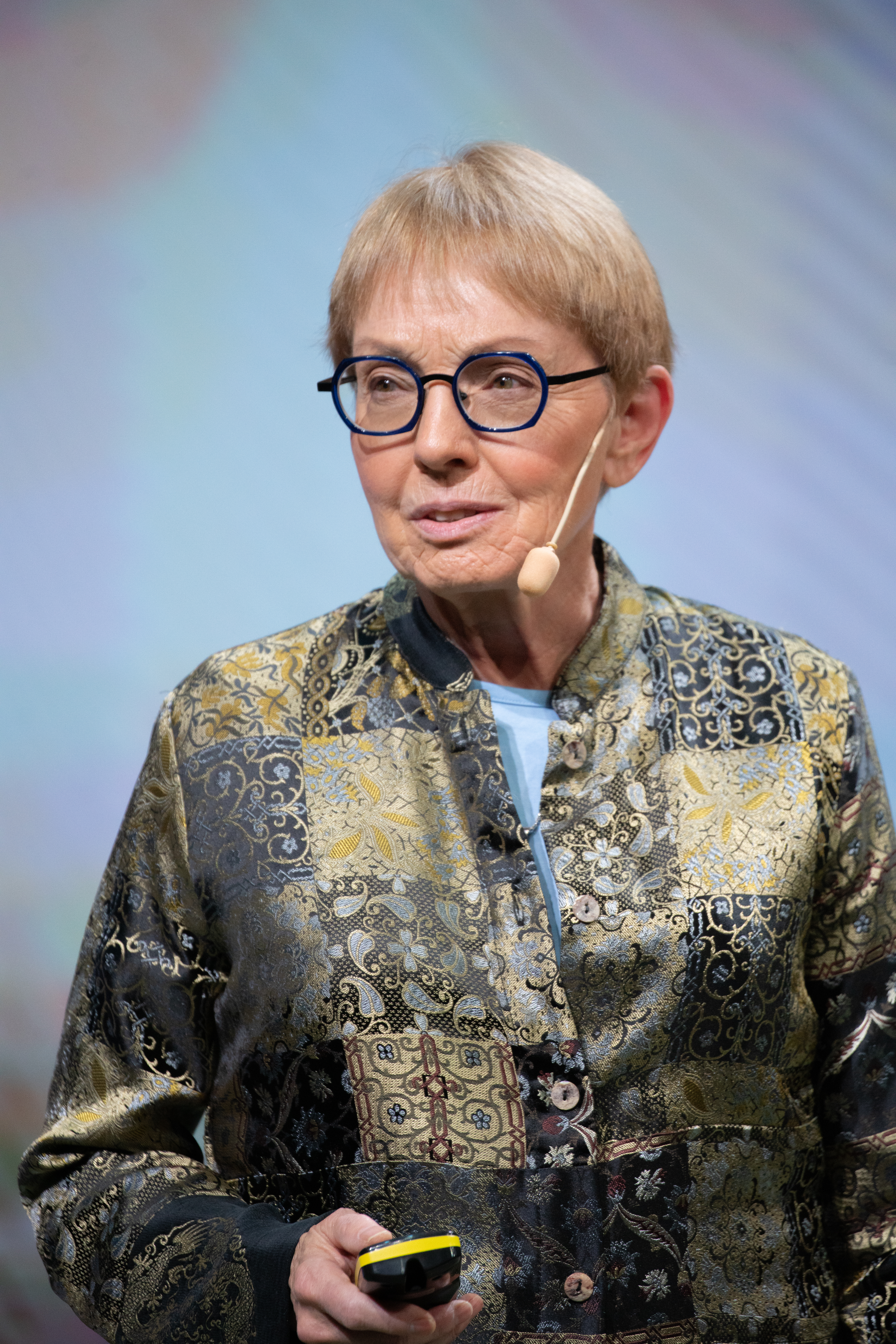
- Ebi at 2024 Nobel Week

Academic background
- Education: Michigan State University (B.S.); Massachusetts Institute of Technology (M.S.); University of Michigan (M.S., Ph.D.)
- Thesis: The Relationship Of Employment Outside The Home To Health And Other Characteristics Of Women And Their Families, Tecumseh, 1959-1978 (cardiovascular, Respiratory, Epidemiology) (1985)
- Doctoral advisor: Millicent W. Higgins

Academic work
- Institutions: Johns Hopkins University; University of Washington
- Website: deohs.washington.edu/faculty/kristie-l-ebi

Kristie Lee Ebi, also Kristie Lee Ebi-Kryston, is an American epidemiologist whose primary focus is the impact of global warming on human health. She is a professor of Global Health and Environmental and Occupational Health Sciences in the Department of Global Health at the University of Washington.

Ebi is the founder and former director (2014-2019) of the Center for Health and the Global Environment (CHanGE) at the University of Washington School of Public Health.

== Education ==
Ebi graduated from Michigan State University with a Bachelor of Science in biochemistry in 1972. In 1976, she completed a Master of Science in toxicology at Massachusetts Institute of Technology. She then went to the University of Michigan where she got a Master of Public Health (1983) and PhD (1985) in epidemiology. She then spent two years doing postgraduate research at the London School of Hygiene and Tropical Medicine.

== Career and research ==
Ebi's research focuses on the health risks of climate variability and climate change, including extreme events, heat stress, food safety und vector-borne disease, and adaptation strategies to address these risks in environments with multiple stress factors.

Ebi was a lead author of the 2018 Special Report on Global Warming of 1.5 °C of the United Nations Intergovernmental Panel on Climate Change (IPCC). Ebi's chapter documents the impacts that 1.5°C of global warming would have on natural and human systems. In public debate on the climate crisis, Ebi compared the report to a doctor with a serious diagnosis for their patient: "If you have cancer, you need the doctor to tell you how serious your cancer is and what your options are."

At TED 2019, Ebi spoke about the effects of increased carbon dioxide on the nutritional content of food.

Ebi was elected a Fellow of the American Geophysical Union in 2023.

== Selected works ==
- Ebi, Kristie L.; Semenza, Jan C. (2008). "Community-Based Adaptation to the Health Impacts of Climate Change". American Journal of Preventive Medicine. 35 (5): 501–507. doi:10.1016/j.amepre.2008.08.018. PMID 18929976.
- O'Neill, Brian C.; Kriegler, Elmar; Ebi, Kristie L.; Kemp-Benedict, Eric; Riahi, Keywan; Rothman, Dale S.; Van Ruijven, Bas J.; Van Vuuren, Detlef P.; Birkmann, Joern; Kok, Kasper; Levy, Marc; Solecki, William (2017). "The roads ahead: Narratives for shared socioeconomic pathways describing world futures in the 21st century". Global Environmental Change. 42: 169–180. doi:10.1016/j.gloenvcha.2015.01.004. hdl:1874/347567.
- Zhu, Chunwu; Kobayashi, Kazuhiko; Loladze, Irakli; Zhu, Jianguo; Jiang, Qian; Xu, Xi; Liu, Gang; Seneweera, Saman; Ebi, Kristie L.; Drewnowski, Adam; Fukagawa, Naomi K.; Ziska, Lewis H. (2018). "Carbon dioxide (CO2) levels this century will alter the protein, micronutrients, and vitamin content of rice grains with potential health consequences for the poorest rice-dependent countries". Science Advances. 4 (5) eaaq1012. Bibcode:2018SciA....4.1012Z. doi:10.1126/sciadv.aaq1012. PMC 5966189. PMID 29806023.
