= Familicide in the Federal District in 2023 =

2023 murder in Brazil

- Location: Cristalina, Unaí, Planaltina, Goiás, Minas Gerais, Federal District, Brazil
- Date: January 2023
- Attack type: Murder, familicide
- Deaths: 10
- Victims: Elizamar da Silva (found dead), Thiago Gabriel Belchior (disappeared), Rafael da Silva (found dead), Rafaela da Silva (found dead), Gabriel da Silva (found dead), Marcos Antônio Lopes de Oliveira (found dead), Renata Juliene Belchior (missing), Gabriela Belchior (missing), Claudia Regina Marques de Oliveira (missing), Ana Beatriz Marques de Oliveira (missing)
- Perpetrators: Horácio Carlos Ferreira Barbosa, Gideon Batista de Menezes, Fabrício Silva Canhedo

The familicide in the Federal District in 2023, a case that became better known in the Brazilian press as the massacre in the DF, refers to the murder of 10 people from the same family between the end of December 2022 and mid-January 2023.

Gideon Batista de Menezes, Horácio Carlos Ferreira Barbosa, Fabrício Silva Canhedo, Carlomam dos Santos Nogueira, and Carlos Henrique de Oliveira, better known as Galego, were arrested in connection with the case. A 17-year-old is also being investigated.

According to Portal Terra, police chief Ricardo Viana, holder of the 6th DP, said during the press conference held on 27 January, at the end of the investigations: "that other police officers in this police station do not have another investigation as painful as this one". "The police chief revealed that the cruelty suffered by the victims 'was never seen within the scope of this Judiciary Police', and that it 'shocked' all the police officers", Terra also revealed.

The case, considered the biggest massacre in the history of the Federal District, had repercussions in major media outlets in the country, such as Globo's g1 portal, CNN Brasil and Folha de São Paulo.

== Victims ==
- Marcos Antônio Lopes de Oliveira, 54 years old; had a criminal record with 12 passages, having met Gideon and Horacio at the Papuda Penitentiary
- Renata Juliene Belchior, 52 years old, wife of Marcos and mother of Thiago
- Gabriela Belchior, 25 years old, daughter of Marcos and Renata
- Cláudia Regina Marques de Oliveira, 54 years old, Marcos' ex-wife
- Ana Beatriz Marques de Oliveira, 19 years old, daughter of Cláudia and Marcos
- Thiago Gabriel Belchior, 30 years old, son of Marcos and husband of Elizamar Silva
- Elizamar Silva, 39 years old, hairdresser, daughter-in-law of Marcos
- Gabriel da Silva, 7 years old, son of Thiago and Elizamar, grandson of Marcos
- Rafael da Silva, 6 years old, son of Thiago and Elizamar, grandson of Marcos
- Rafaela da Silva, 6 years old, daughter of Thiago and Elizamar, twin of Rafael

== The crime ==
=== Backdrop ===
Marcos Antônio Lopes de Oliveira, his wife Renata and their daughter, Gabriela, lived in a farm, in the Itapoã condominium, where Gideon and Horácio also lived. Upon learning that Marcos intended to sell the land, the duo devised a plan: to kill Marcos and his descendants so that they could become owners of the property, valued at 2 million reais. In addition, they also knew that Marcos' ex-wife, Cláudia, had received 200 thousand from the sale of a house, money that they also wanted to keep.

The crime began to be planned months before, according to the Civil Police, which included renting a house in Vale do Sol in October 2022 that would later serve as a prison.

=== Motivation ===
According to the corporation, the slaughter was motivated by the BRL 2 million that the sale of the property could yield. However, Marcos, who had taken the place of another farm owner without the owners' approval, did not even own the farm, as a process of repossession was pending in court.

=== Chronology ===
28 December 2022: Marcos, his wife Renata and the couple's daughter, Gabriela, were surrendered at the farm where they lived by Carlomam and the teenager, in a simulation of robbery, where Gideon and Horácio pretended to be victims. Marcos reacted and Carloman shot him in the back of the head. Then, they were all gagged, blindfolded, tied up and taken to captivity in Planaltina, where Carlomam, Gideon and Horácio dismembered Marcos' body before burying him. An autopsy will determine if he was still alive when he was dismembered.

4 January 2023: Using Marcos' cell phone, the group set a trap for Cláudia, calling to offer Gideon, Horácio and Fabrício's help in moving her and her daughter, Ana Beatriz, to their new home. At the scene, the three allowed Carlomam to enter, who surrendered mother and daughter in a new robbery simulation, with Gideon and Horácio becoming victims again. Both were taken to Planaltina's captivity, where Gabriela and Renata were already.

12 January 2023: Thiago, son of Marcos Antônio, asked Gideon and Horácio about his father's whereabouts, which made the group anticipate the kidnapping of his family. Also attracted by a message sent from his father's cell phone, asking him to take his wife and children to the farm, he was gagged and taken to captivity in Planaltina. His wife and children, Elizamar, Gabriel, Rafael and Rafaela, were taken by car to Cristalina, Goiás, where they were killed and the vehicle was burned. "I'm going to need urgent help. If possible, come with Lizi (Elizamar) and the boys", said part of the message sent to Thiago by the group of criminals.

14 January 2023: Renata and Gabriela are taken by car to Unaí, Minas Gerais, where they are killed and the car is burned.

15 January 2023: Carlomam and Horácio stab Thiago, Cláudia and Ana to death and bury their bodies in a cistern, in a rural area of Planaltina.

== Investigations ==
Investigations began on 12 January, after Elizamar's two eldest children noticed that their mother was gone. They looked for the police, who began the search, finding the hairdresser's car, with four charred bodies, on a state highway in Cristalina, in Goiás, on 13 January. Also on the 13th, the complaint that four other members of the family had disappeared – Thiago, Marcos, Renata and Gabriela – was made and the police found a car belonging to Marcos with two charred bodies on the 14th. The dismembered body of Marcos was found on the 18th and the bodies of Thiago, Cláudia and Ana, on the 24th.

According to police investigations, the victims in captivity had been forced to pass personal data and bank information to the criminals, in addition to providing credit cards and passwords.

== Arrest, trial and punishment ==
Horácio and Gideon were the first to be arrested and initially blamed Marcos and Thiago for the massacre, even saying that Thiago had killed his children. Fabrício was arrested on the same day, 17 January, at night.

Carloman dos Santos turned himself in on 25 January (the police even offered a reward of 20,000 for information), while Carlos was the last to be arrested.

The five prisoners, who are awaiting trial, were indicted for the crimes of robbery (robbery followed by death), corruption of minors, extortion through qualified kidnapping resulting in death, qualified homicide for base reasons and concealment of a corpse. Together, the penalties can exceed 300 years in prison.

== Updates ==
On 16 February 2023, the DF Chamber of Deputies honored the civil police officers who elucidated the crime.
