= Paulo Roberto de Souza Matos =

Brazilian politician (1944–2023)

Member of the Chamber of Deputies of Brazil
- In office 1987–1991

Member of the Legislative Assembly of Pará
- In office 1983–1987

Personal details
- Born: 17 July 1944; Santarém, Pará, Brazil
- Died: 28 January 2023 (aged 78); Belém, Brazil
- Political party: PMDB

Paulo Roberto de Souza Matos (17 July 1944 – 28 January 2023) was a Brazilian politician. A member of the Brazilian Democratic Movement Party, he served in the Legislative Assembly of Pará from 1983 to 1987 and in the Chamber of Deputies from 1987 to 1991.

De Souza Matos died in Belém on 28 January 2023, at the age of 78.
