= Salatiel Carvalho =

Brazilian evangelical pastor (1953/1954 – 2023)

- Born: 5 April 1954
- Died: 31 August 2023 (aged 69)
- Occupation: Politician

Salatiel Carvalho (5 April 1954– 31 August 2023) was a Brazilian evangelical pastor, engineer, and politician. He served as a deputy from 1987 to 2003. Carvalho died on 31 August 2023, at the age of 69.
