= Chico Ferramenta =

Brazilian trade unionist and politician (1959–2023)

Member of the Chamber of Deputies of Brazil
- In office 1995–1996

Member of the Legislative Assembly of Minas Gerais
- In office 1987–1988

Personal details
- Born: Francisco Carlos Delfino; 8 January 1959; Bom Despacho, Minas Gerais, Minas Gerais, Brazil
- Died: 4 July 2023 (aged 64); Ipatinga, Minas Gerais, Brazil
- Political party: PT
- Occupation: Trade unionist

Francisco Carlos Delfino (8 January 1959 – 4 July 2023), known as Chico Ferramenta, was a Brazilian trade unionist and politician. A member of the Workers' Party, he served in the Chamber of Deputies from 1995 to 1996.

Ferramenta died of complications from pneumonia in Ipatinga, on 4 July 2023, at the age of 64.
