= Germano Mathias =

Brazilian actor (1934–2023)

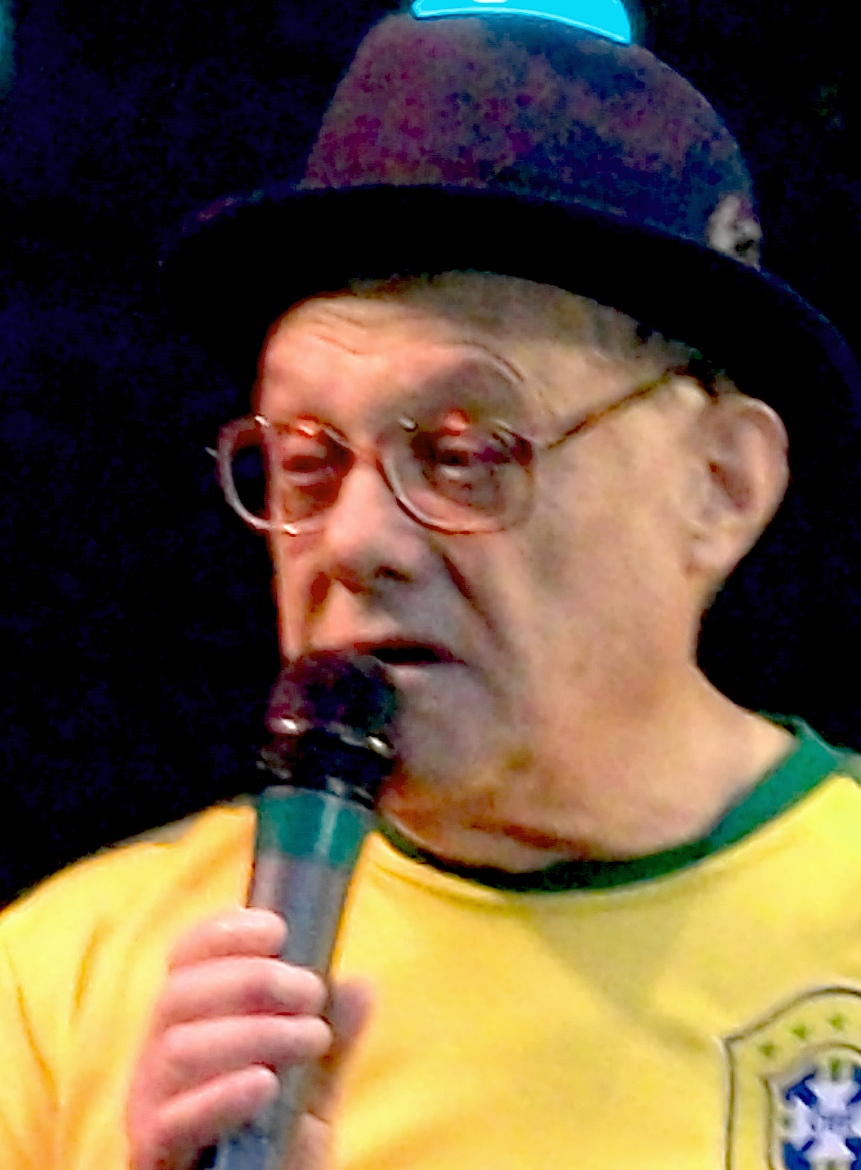
- Mathias in 2010
- Born: 2 June 1934; São Paulo, Brazil
- Died: 22 February 2023 (aged 88); Rio de Janeiro, Brazil

Germano Mathias (2 June 1934 – 22 February 2023) was a Brazilian singer-songwriter and composer, who specialized in sambas. He was nicknamed the "Catedrático do Samba" ("the Samba Cathedratic").

== Life and career ==
Born in São Paulo, the son of two Portuguese immigrants, Mathias studied drums at the Rosas Negras School of Samba. He started his career as a musician in 1955, winning a 14-month contract with Radio Tupi in the radio contest for new music artists "À procura de um astro" ("Looking for a star"). Following his first hit "Minha nega na janela", in a few years he got a significant success both as a singer and as a composer, but his popularity declined with the arrival of rock and other musical genres, up to the point he temporarily left his musical activities to work as a justice officer. His career eventually had a resurgence in the late 1970s, when Gilberto Gil recorded several songs composed by him, leading to many of his previous works to be rediscovered and re-released.

Mathias' last album was Tributo a Caco Velho, released in 2004. In 2021, the tribute album #PartiuZePelintra – Tributo a Germano Mathias was released, with some of his songs performed by prominent artists including Gilberto Gil, Fafá de Belém, Zélia Duncan and Leila Pinheiro.

Mathias died from complications of pneumonia on 22 February 2023, at the age of 88. At the time of his death he was preparing a new album, 67 anos de samba-tradição.

== Discography ==
Albums

- 1957 - Germano Matias, o sambista diferente
- 1958 - Em continência do samba
- 1959 - Hoje tem batucada
- 1962 - Ginga no asfalto
- 1965 - Samba de branco
- 1968 - O Catedrático do Samba
- 1970 - 1970 Sambas pra seu governo (with Demônios da Garoa)
- 1971 - Samba é comigo mesmo
- 1973 - O Catedrático do samba 2
- 1999 - História do samba paulista (with Aldo Bueno, Thobias da Vai-Vai and Osvaldinho da Cuíca)
- 2002 - MPB Especial
- 2002 - Talento de bamba
- 2004 - Tributo a Caco Velho
