= Trincheira/Bacajá Indigenous Territory =

Indigenous territory in Brazil

- Terra Indígena Trincheira/Bacajá
- Location within Brazil
- Location: Senador José Porfírio, São Félix do Xingu, Altamira, and Anapu, Pará
- Coordinates: 4°43′49″S 51°27′40″W
- Area: 1,650,939 ha (4,079,560 acres)
- Designation: Indigenous territory

The Trincheira/Bacajá Indigenous Territory is an indigenous territory located in the Brazilian state of Pará. Regularized and traditionally occupied, it has an area of 1,650,939 hectares and a population of 746 people (2010), primarily from the Araweté and Asurini peoples of the Xingu.

The territory is currently the target of intense deforestation, land grabbing, mining, livestock farming and illegal hunting.

== History ==
It is estimated that the Xikrins reached the banks of the Bacajá River between 1926 and 1927, coming into conflict with the Paracanãs, Arauetés and Assurinis. The first official contact of the sertanistas from the Indian Protection Service (SPI) with the Xikrin do Bacajá people was in November 1959 near the mouth of the Igarapé Golosa with the Bacajá River. At this time, this contact caused epidemics and deaths among these indigenous people, causing them to flee contact with the SPI. Since the 1980s, invasions, deforestation and illegal mining have been recorded on indigenous land, carried out mainly by large farmers in the city of Marabá. However, it was only in 1993 that the territory was officially declared and only in October 1996 was it ratified.

== Logging ==
Timber theft activities in the region increased in intensity in 2016, due to the construction of roads created specifically to transport logs illegally. Until 2017, the deforestation rate remained stable between 45 and 250 hectares devastated. Deforestation exploded, however, in 2018 (with more than 1,100 hectares deforested) and 2019 when then-president-elect Jair Bolsonaro assumed that he would review demarcations of indigenous territories in the country and open them for the advancement of agriculture and livestock.

In April 2020, a major action by Ibama destroyed a bridge used to remove illegal wood from the region, which was built through a 300-meter landfill that damaged the banks of the Negro River. The body also fined the Municipality of São Félix do Xingu has been supporting invaders of indigenous lands located in the Médio Xingu. After Ibama's actions were publicized in the media, former president Jair Bolsonaro dismissed Ibama's then coordinator of inspection operations, Hugo Loss, who participated in the action, and the general coordinator of inspection, Renê Luiz de Oliveira. According to INPE data, the indigenous territory ended 2020 as the fourth most deforested in the country.

In July 2021, Operation Samaúma, conducted jointly by Ibama, FUNAI, the Federal Police and the National Public Security Force, destroyed two facilities and a bridge related to deforestation and illegal mining in the TI. Furthermore, fences illegally demarcating plots of land were removed by agents. In the following two years, other actions involving Ibama and the Federal Police were carried out in the city of São Félix do Xingu, demobilizing camps, houses and bridges illegally installed to enable illegal deforestation.

In May 2022, the Federal Public Ministry filed a lawsuit suing FUNAI, the Federal Government and Ibama for failure to monitor indigenous territory, in addition to requesting that the Court order the bodies to carry out emergency inspection actions. The Xikrins themselves denounced the approach of invaders in the TI villages, which could lead to serious conflicts in the region.
