= Edmar Moreira =

Brazilian politician (1939–2023)

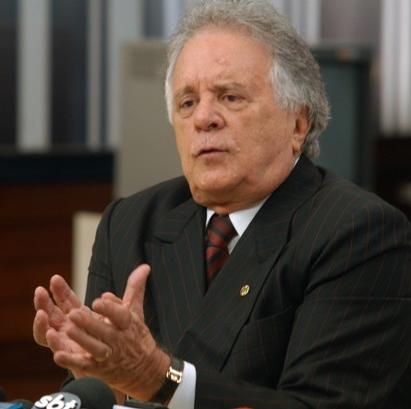
- Moreira in 2009

Member of the Chamber of Deputies of Brazil for Minas Gerais
- In office 25 February 2014 – 4 April 2014
- In office 1 February 1999 – 1 February 2011
- In office 1 February 1991 – 1 February 1995

Personal details
- Born: Edmar Batista Moreira; 25 September 1939 São João Nepomuceno, Brazil
- Died: 17 March 2023 (aged 83)
- Party: PRN (1989–1993); PP (1993–1995); Progressistas (1995–2003); PL (2003–2005); DEM (2005–2009); PL (2009–2013); PTB (2013–2015)
- Education: Federal University of Juiz de Fora
- Occupation: Lawyer

Edmar Batista Moreira (25 September 1939 – 17 March 2023) was a Brazilian lawyer and politician. A member of several political parties throughout his career, he served in the Chamber of Deputies for three non-consecutive mandates: 1991 to 1995, 1999 to 2011, and February to April 2014.

Moreira died on 17 March 2023, at the age of 83.
