= Roberto Purini =

Brazilian lawyer and politician (1937–2023)

Member of the Legislative Assembly of São Paulo
- In office 1979–1999

Personal details
- Born: Roberto Hilvo Giovani Purini; 21 March 1937; Poloni, Brazil
- Died: 3 February 2023 (aged 85); Bauru, Brazil
- Political party: MDB
- Occupation: Lawyer

Roberto Hilbo Giovani Purini (21 March 1937 – 3 February 2023) was a Brazilian lawyer and politician. A member of the Brazilian Democratic Movement, he served in the Legislative Assembly of São Paulo from 1979 to 1999.

Purini died in Bauru on 3 February 2023, at the age of 85.
