= Igarapé =

Town in Minas Gerais, Brazil

Coordinates: 20°04′12″S 44°18′07″W

- Municipality
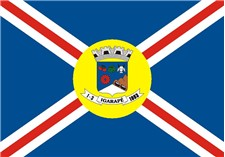
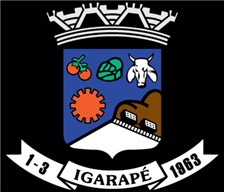
- Flag Coat of arms
- Interactive map of Igarapé
- Country: Brazil
- State: Minas Gerais
- Region: Southeast

Population (2022 Census)
  - Total: 45,847
  - Estimate (2025): 49,120
- Time zone: UTC−3 (BRT)

Location of Igarapé within Minas Gerais

Igarapé is a Brazilian municipality located in the state of Minas Gerais. The city belongs to the mesoregion Metropolitana de Belo Horizonte and to the microregion of Belo Horizonte. In 2025, the estimated population was 49,120.

== See also ==
- List of municipalities in Minas Gerais
