= José Bonifácio Novellino =

Brazilian politician (1945–2023)

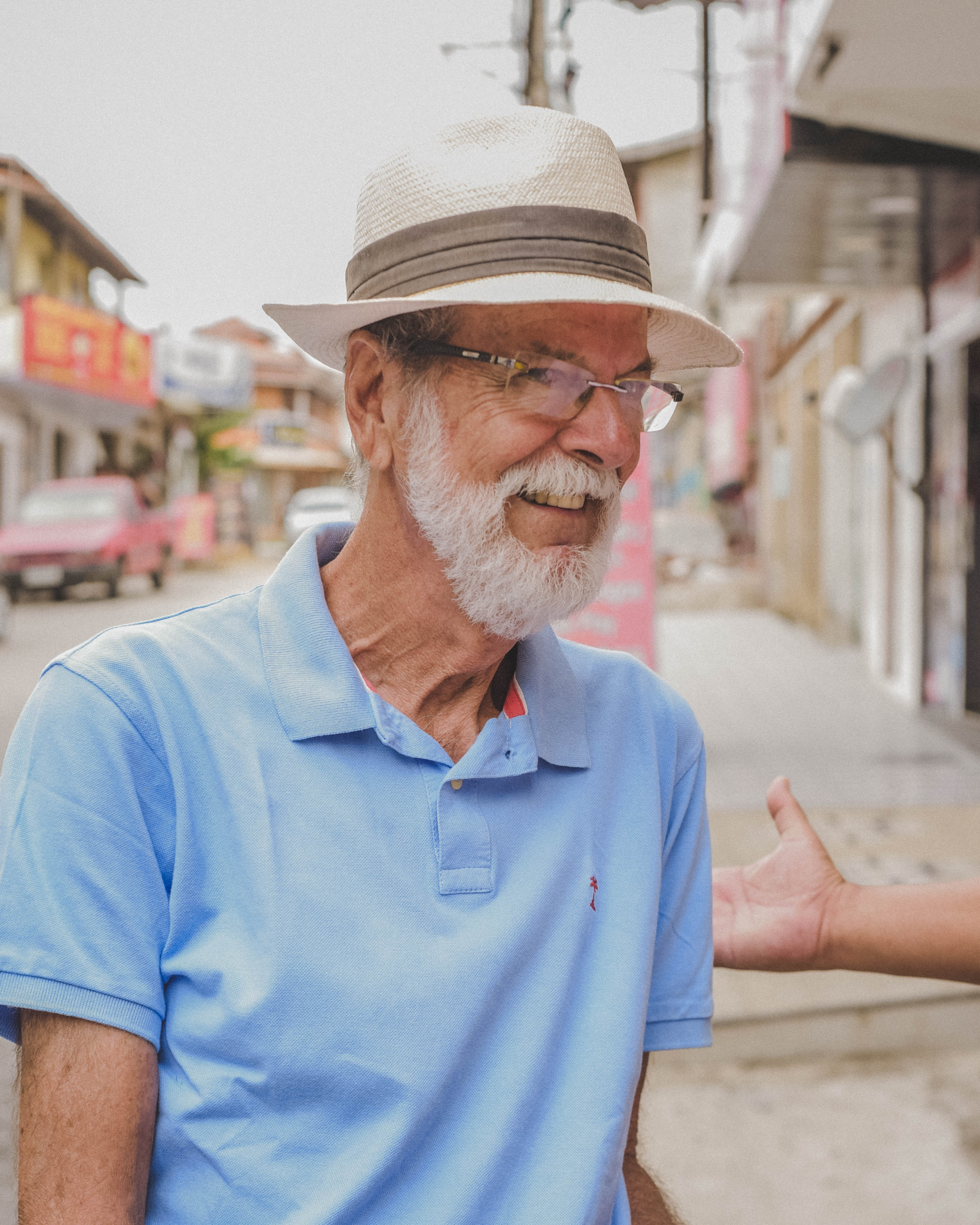
- Novellino in 2020

Member of the Legislative Assembly of Rio de Janeiro
- In office 3 January 2005 – 31 January 2007

Personal details
- Born: José Bonifácio Ferreira Novellino; 14 May 1945 Cabo Frio, Rio de Janeiro, Brazil
- Died: 17 July 2023 (aged 78) Cabo Frio, Rio de Janeiro, Brazil
- Party: MDB (1973–1995); PDT (1995–2023)
- Education: Fluminense Federal University
- Occupation: Economist

José Bonifácio Ferreira Novellino (14 May 1945 – 17 July 2023) was a Brazilian economist and politician. A member of the Democratic Labour Party, he served in the Legislative Assembly of Rio de Janeiro from 2005 to 2007.

Novellino died of cancer in Cabo Frio on 17 July 2023, at the age of 78.
