= Paulo de Tarso Sanseverino =

Brazilian jurist (1959–2023)

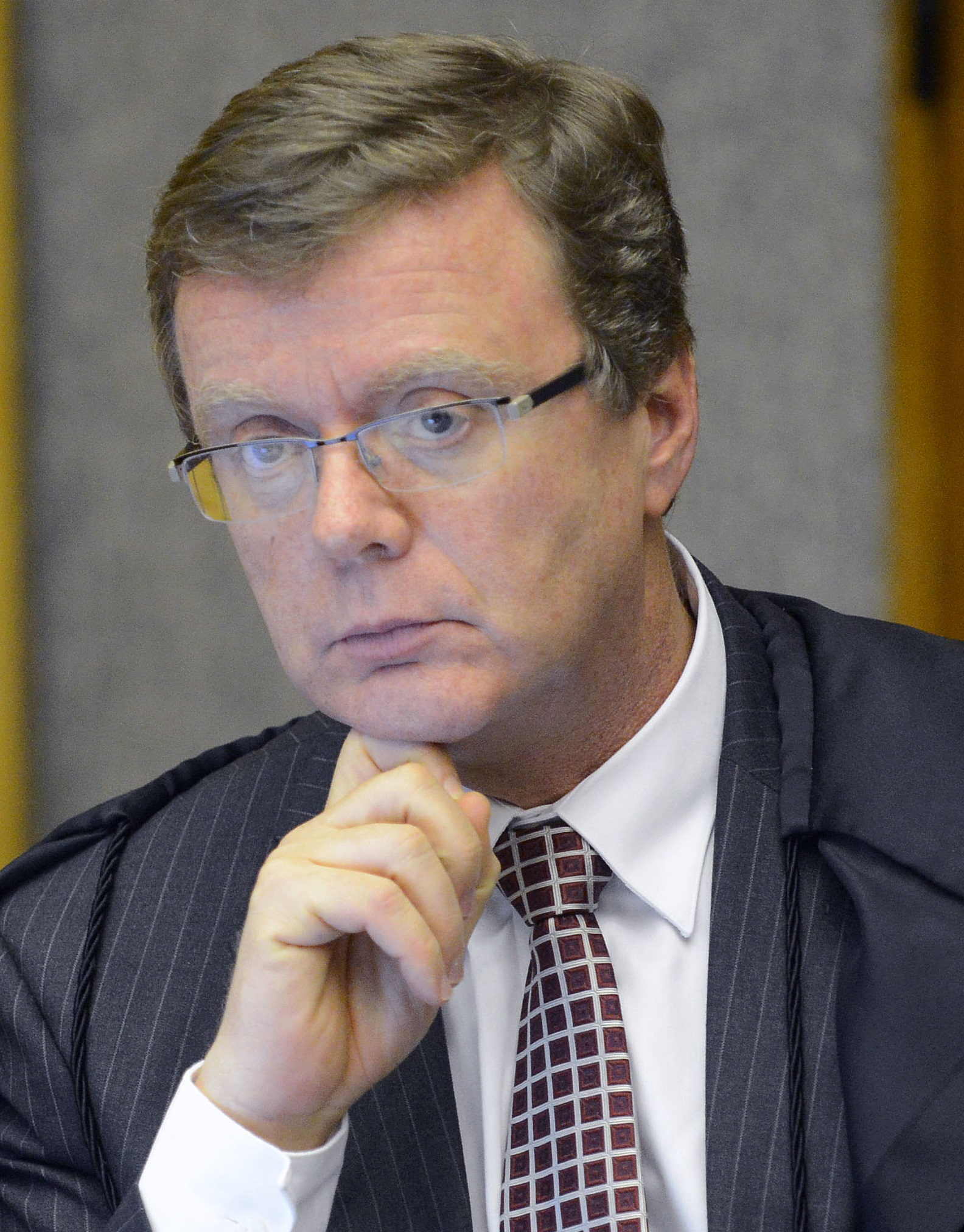
- On 2 October 2014

Magistrate of the Superior Court of Justice of Brazil
- In office August 10, 2010 – April 8, 2023
- Preceded by: Denise Arruda
- Succeeded by: Afrânio Vilela

Personal details
- Born: 16 June 1959 Porto Alegre, Rio Grande do Sul, Brazil
- Died: 8 April 2023 (aged 63) Porto Alegre, Rio Grande do Sul, Brazil
- Education: Federal University of Rio Grande do Sul; Pontifical Catholic University of Rio Grande do Sul (1983)

Paulo de Tarso Sanseverino (16 June 1959 – 8 April 2023) was a Brazilian jurist, magistrate, and academic. He served as a Minister (Justice) of the Superior Court of Justice of Brazil, the highest appellate court in Brazil for non-constitutional questions of federal law, from his appointment by President Luiz Inácio Lula da Silva in 2010 until his death in office in April 2023.

He died from cancer at Hospital Moinhos de Vento in Porto Alegre, Rio Grande do Sul, on 8 April 2023, at the age of 63.
