= Eduardo Barbosa (politician) =

Brazilian politician (1958–2023)

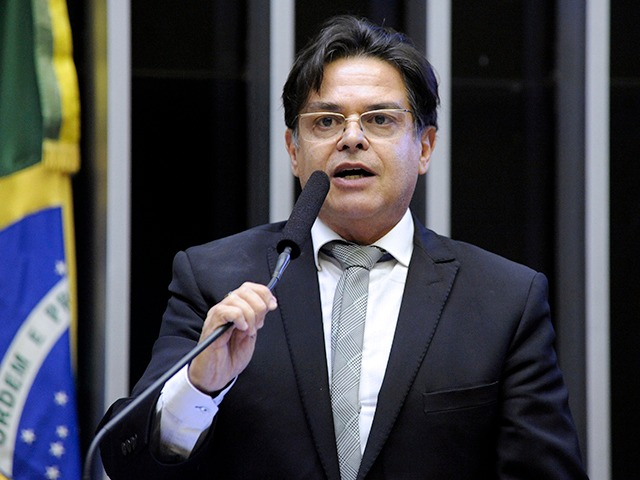
- Barbosa in 2021

Member of the Chamber of Deputies of Brazil for Minas Gerais
- In office 1 February 1995 – 1 February 2023

Personal details
- Born: Eduardo Luiz Barros Barbosa; 25 August 1958; Pará de Minas, Brazil
- Died: 23 August 2023 (aged 64); Brasília, Brazil
- Political party: PSDB
- Education: Federal University of Minas Gerais; Faculdade de Medicina de Ribeirão Preto
- Occupation: Doctor

Eduardo Luiz Barros Barbosa (25 August 1958 – 23 August 2023) was a Brazilian doctor and politician. A member of the Brazilian Social Democracy Party, he served in the Chamber of Deputies from 1995 to 2023.

Barbosa died in Brasília on 23 August 2023, at the age of 64.
