= Billboard Live Music Awards =

International live music award

The event logo for 2009

The Billboard Live Music Awards (previously known as the Billboard Touring Conference and Awards until 2018) is an annual meeting sponsored by Billboard magazine that honors the top international live entertainment industry artists and professionals. Established in 2004, it has thus been described as "part industry conference, part awards show".

The last such annual event appears to have been in 2019; it is unclear if the conference and awards have, or will, continue past that year.

Many of the awards are based on Billboard's Boxscore chart tracking concert, comedy and other live entertainment attendance and gate receipts, and on real box office performance. As a result, the awards often equate to commercial success. The "top tour" superlative award is also given on the basis of fan polls. The "Legend of Live" and Humanitarian awards are given to individuals for their ongoing contributions to the live entertainment touring industry.

== History ==
The conference and awards are held in November of each year, traditionally at the Roosevelt Hotel in Midtown Manhattan in New York City but, since 2016, at hotels in the Los Angeles area. The conference usually takes place over two days and is attended by figures from the music and concert industry. Each year features a keynote speaker from the performance industry, who in the past have included the likes of Gene Simmons of Kiss and 3 Doors Down.

While recorded music has an established awards structure headed by the Grammy Awards and also featuring the American Music Awards and the MTV Video Music Awards, live performance music has not had the same. The Billboard Touring Awards are an attempt to fill that gap. Billboard previously attempted to enter the awards arena for recorded music with the charts-based Billboard Music Award, which lasted from 1990 through 2006, returning in 2011. Those awards featured two slots for Concert Venue Award and Touring Venue Award, but were not otherwise live-performance-based.

Award names and awards given themselves have varied somewhat each year, with for example the Top Comedy Tour and Concert Marketing and Promotion Awards being added in 2007 and the Fans Choice being added in 2008, both being determined by fan vote. There are typically three nominees in each category.

Repeat winners in the awards have been common, with country artist Kenny Chesney winning Top Package Tour six consecutive years through 2009 and Bonnaroo Music Festival winning four times as well starting in 2004.

== Winners ==
=== 2019 ===
The sixteenth annual edition of the awards took place on November 5, 2019, at the Montage Beverly Hills in Beverly Hills, California.

- Legend of Live + Tour of the Year: P!nk, Beautiful Trauma World Tour
- Tour of the Summer: Hootie & the Blowfish, Group Therapy Tour
- Top Boxscore: Spice Girls - Spice World - 2019 Tour, Wembley Stadium, London, England - June 13–15, 2019
- Top Grossing: Ed Sheeran
- Top Manager: Joyce Smyth (Rolling Stones)
- Top Concert & marketing Promotions: Verizon Up x Shawn Mendes x Camila Cabello Customer Loyalty Promotion
- Top Arena: Madison Square Garden - New York City
- Top Agency: WME
- Chip Hopper Award: Sara Bollwinkel, Agent at Paradigm

=== 2018 ===
The fifteenth annual edition of the (newly named) awards took place on November 13, 2018, at the Montage Beverly Hills in Beverly Hills, California, in proceedings hosted by comedian Roy Wood Jr.

- Top World Tour: Ed Sheeran, ÷ Tour
- Top U.S. Tour: Taylor Swift, Reputation Stadium Tour
- Top Tour & Top Draw: Ed Sheeran, ÷ Tour
- Top Package: not given
- Breakthrough Artist: Post Malone
- Top Comedy Tour: Kevin Hart
- Top Festival: Outside Lands Music and Arts Festival
- Top Promoter: Live Nation Entertainment
- Top Independent Promoter (Worldwide): OCESA-CIE
- Top Agency: CAA
- Top Manager: Dre London, Post Malone
- Top Boxscore: U2, Estadio do Morumbi, São Paulo, October 19–25, 2017
- Top Arena: Madison Square Garden, New York
- Top Club: Brooklyn Steel, Brooklyn
- Top Amphitheater: Hollywood Bowl, Los Angeles
- Top Venue (Under 10,000 seats): Radio City Music Hall, New York
- Top Venue (Under 5,000 Seats): The Colosseum at Caesars Palace, Las Vegas
- Concert Marketing and Promotion: Khalid and Hollister Co.
- Humanitarian: not given
- Legend Of Live: John Mayer

=== 2017 ===
The fourteenth annual edition of the awards took place on November 15, 2017, at the Montage Beverly Hills in Beverly Hills, California, in proceedings hosted by Hasan Minhaj.

- Top Tour: Guns N' Roses, Not in This Lifetime... Tour
- Top Draw: Guns N' Roses
- Top Package: not given
- Breakout Artist: Lil Uzi Vert
- Top Comedy Tour: Jerry Seinfeld
- Top Festival: Coachella Valley Music and Arts Festival
- Top Promoter: Live Nation Entertainment
- Top Independent Promoter (Worldwide): Another Planet Entertainment
- Top Agency: Paradigm Talent Agency
- Top Manager: Pat Corcoran, Chance the Rapper
- Top Boxscore: U2, Stade de France, Saint-Denis, July 25–26, 2017
- Top Arena: T-Mobile Arena, Las Vegas
- Top Club: House of Blues, Boston
- Top Amphitheater: Hollywood Bowl, Los Angeles
- Top Venue (Under 10,000 seats): Radio City Music Hall, New York
- Top Venue (Under 5,000 Seats): The Colosseum at Caesars Palace, Las Vegas
- Concert Marketing & Promotion Award: Foo Fighters' Cal Jam and North American Concrete and Gold Tour with Capital One
- Humanitarian: Everytown for Gun Safety
- Legend Of Live: Tim McGraw and Faith Hill

=== 2016 ===
The thirteenth annual Billboard Touring Awards took place on a single day, November 9, 2016, this time at the SLS Hotel in Beverly Hills, California.

- Top Tour: Bruce Springsteen & the E Street Band, The River Tour 2016
- Top Draw: Coldplay
- Top Package: Justin Bieber Purpose Tour featuring Moxie Raia and Post Malone
- Breakthrough: Adele
- Top Comedy Tour: Kevin Hart
- Top Festival: Coachella Valley Music and Arts Festival
- Top Promoter: Live Nation Entertainment
- Top Independent Promoter (U.S.): Another Planet Entertainment
- Top Independent Promoter (International): SJM Concerts
- Top Agency: Creative Artists Agency
- Top Manager: Maverick Management
- Top Boxscore: Coldplay – Wembley Stadium (June 15–16 & 18–19)
- Top Arena: The O2, London
- Top Club: House of Blues, Boston
- Top Amphitheater: BB&T Pavilion, Camden, New Jersey
- Top Venue (Under 10,000 seats): Radio City Music Hall
- Top Venue (Under 5,000 Seats): The Colosseum at Caesars Palace, Las Vegas
- Concert Marketing & Promotion Award: Chance the Rapper
- Golden Circle: Brian Murphy, Goldenvoice/AEG Live
- Humanitarian: Scooter Braun
- Legend Of Live: Bon Jovi

=== 2015 ===
The twelfth annual Billboard Touring Awards took place on a single day, November 19, 2015, at the Roosevelt Hotel in New York City.

- Top Tour: One Direction, On the Road Again Tour
- Top Draw: One Direction
- Top Boxscore: Fare Thee Well: Celebrating 50 Years of the Grateful Dead – Soldier Field (July 3–5)
- Top Comedy Tour: Kevin Hart
- Top Package: Kenny Chesney, The Big Revival Tour
- Breakthrough: Ed Sheeran
- Top Festival: Coachella Valley Music and Arts Festival
- Top Arena: O2 Arena, London
- Top Venue (Under 10,000 seats): Radio City Music Hall, New York
- Top Venue (Under 5,000 seats): The Colosseum at Caesars Palace, Las Vegas
- Top Club: House of Blues, Boston
- Top Amphitheater: The Gorge Amphitheatre, George, Washington
- Top Promoter: Live Nation
- Top Independent Promoter (U.S.): Another Planet Entertainment, San Francisco
- Top Independent Promoter (International): Frontier Touring Company, Australia and New Zealand
- Top Agency: Creative Artists Agency
- Top Manager: Modest! Management
- Humanitarian Award: Hugh Evans
- Concert Marketing & Promotion Award: Imagine Dragons/Southwest Airlines
- Legend of Live: Bob Seger
- Golden Circle Award: Barbara Marx Hubbard

=== 2014 ===
The eleventh annual Billboard Touring Awards took place on over two days in November 19–20, 2014, at the Roosevelt Hotel in New York City.

- Top Tour: One Direction, Where We Are Tour
- Top Draw: One Direction
- Top Boxscore: The Rolling Stones – Tokyo Dome (February 26, March 4, 6)
- Top Comedy Tour: Jeff Dunham
- Top Package: Katy Perry's Prismatic Tour, featuring Capital Cities, Kacey Musgraves, Tegan & Sarah, Becky G
- Breakthrough: Florida Georgia Line
- Top Festival: Coachella Valley Music and Arts Festival
- Top Arena: O2 Arena, London
- Top Venue (Under 10,000 seats): Radio City Music Hall, New York
- Top Venue (Under 5,000 seats): The Colosseum at Caesars Palace, Las Vegas
- Top Club: House of Blues, Boston
- Top Amphitheater: Molson Canadian Amphitheatre, Toronto
- Top Promoter: Live Nation
- Top Independent Promoter (U.S.): C3 Presents, Austin, Texas
- Top Independent Promoter (International): T4F, São Paulo, Brazil
- Top Agency: Creative Artists Agency
- Top Manager: Modest! Management
- Humanitarian Award: Light of Day Foundation
- Concert Marketing & Promotion Award: Billy Joel/Citibank at Madison Square Garden
- Legend of Live: Lionel Richie
- Golden Circle Award: Ron Delsener

=== 2013 ===
The tenth annual Billboard Touring Awards took place on over two days in November 13 and 14, 2013, at the Roosevelt Hotel in New York City.

- Top Tour: Bon Jovi, Because We Can Tour
- Top Draw: Bon Jovi
- Top Boxscore: P!nk – Rod Laver Arena, Melbourne (July 7-August 26)
- Top Comedy Tour: Jeff Dunham
- Top Package: Taylor Swift's Red Tour, featuring Ed Sheeran, Joel Crouse, Brett Eldredge, Florida Georgia Line and Casey James
- Breakthrough: One Direction
- Top Festival: Coachella Valley Music and Arts Festival
- Top Arena: O2 Arena, London
- Top Venue (Under 10,000 seats): Radio City Music Hall, New York
- Top Venue (Under 5,000 seats): The Colosseum at Caesars Palace, Las Vegas
- Top Club: House of Blues, Orlando, Florida
- Top Amphitheater: The Gorge, George, Washington
- Top Promoter: Live Nation
- Top Independent Promoter (U.S.): C3 Presents, Austin, Texas
- Top Independent Promoter (International): T4F, São Paulo, Brazil
- Top Agency: Creative Artists Agency
- Top Manager: Bon Jovi Management
- Humanitarian Award: Marcie Allen (President of MAC Presents)
- Eventful Fans' Choice Award: Bon Jovi
- Concert Marketing & Promotion Award: The Rolling Stones, 50 & Counting Tour
- Legend of Live: George Strait
- Hauler of the Decade Award: Vans Warped Tour

=== 2012 ===
The ninth annual Billboard Touring Awards again took place on over two days in November 2012 at the Roosevelt Hotel in New York City, despite the aftereffects of Superstorm Sandy.

- Top Tour: Roger Waters, The Wall Live
- Top Draw: Bruce Springsteen, Wrecking Ball Tour
- Top Package: Brothers of the Sun Tour, featuring Kenny Chesney, Tim McGraw, Grace Potter & the Nocturnals, and Jake Owen
- Breakthrough: Lady Antebellum
- Top Comedy Tour: Jeff Dunham
- Top Boxscore: Coachella Valley Music and Arts Festival, April 13–22
- Top Festival: Coachella Valley Music and Arts Festival
- Top Arena: O2 Arena, London
- Top Venue (Under 10,000 seats): Radio City Music Hall, New York
- Top Venue (Under 5,000 seats): The Colosseum at Caesars Palace, Las Vegas
- Top Club (Based on attendance): 9:30 Club, Washington, D.C.
- Top Amphitheater: Nikon at Jones Beach Theater, Wantagh, New York
- Top Promoter: Live Nation Entertainment
- Top Independent Promoter (U.S.): C3 Presents, Austin, Texas
- Top Independent Promoter (International): T4F, São Paulo, Brazil
- Top Agency: William Morris Endeavor Entertainment
- Top Manager: Mark Fenwick
- Concert Marketing & Promotion Award: Demi Lovato/Hallmark
- Humanitarian Award: Apollo Theater
- Eventful Fan's Choice: Lady Gaga
- Creative Content: Michael Jackson: The Immortal World Tour by Cirque du Soleil
- Road Warrior: Kenny Chesney
- Legend of Scribe: Ray Waddell
- Legend of Live: Neil Diamond

=== 2011 ===
The eighth annual Billboard Touring Awards took place on over two days in November 2011 at the Roosevelt Hotel in New York City.

- Top Tour: U2, 360° Tour
- Top Draw: U2, 360° Tour
- Top Package: Kenny Chesney's Goin' Coastal Tour, with Zac Brown Band, Uncle Kracker, Billy Currington
- Breakthrough: Jason Aldean
- Top Comedy Tour: Jeff Dunham
- Top Boxscore: Take That, Wembley Stadium, London, June 30 – July 9
- Top Festival: Coachella Valley Music and Arts Festival
- Top Arena: O2 Arena, London
- Top Venue (Under 10,000 seats): Radio City Music Hall, New York
- Top Venue (Under 5,000 seats): The Colosseum at Caesars Palace, Paradise, Nevada
- Top Club (Based on attendance): 9:30 Club, Washington, D.C.
- Top Amphitheater: Comcast Center, Mansfield, Massachusetts
- Top Promoter: Live Nation Entertainment
- Top Independent Promoter (U.S.): C3 Presents, Austin, Texas
- Top Independent Promoter (International): SJM Concerts, London
- Top Agency: William Morris Endeavor Entertainment
- Top Manager: Front Line Management Group
- Apple Award: Perry Farrell
- Concert Marketing & Promotion Award: Taylor Swift's Speak Now World Tour 2011 sponsored by CoverGirl
- Humanitarian Award: Coran Capshaw
- Eventful Fan's Choice: Bon Jovi
- Legend of Live: Journey

=== 2010 ===
The seventh annual Billboard Touring Awards took place on November 3 and 4, 2010, at the Sheraton Hotel in New York City, NY.

- Top Tour: U2, 360° Tour
- Top Draw: U2, 360° Tour
- Top Package: Taylor Swift with Kellie Pickler and Gloriana
- Breakthrough: Lady Gaga
- Top Comedy Tour: Dane Cook
- Top Boxscore: AC/DC, ANZ Stadium, Sydney, Feb. 18, 20, 22
- Top Festival: Download Festival, Donington Park, Castle Donington, U.K. June 11–13
- Top Arena: O2 Arena, London
- Top Venue (Under 10,000 seats): Radio City Music Hall, NYC
- Top Venue (Under 5,000 seats): The Colosseum at Caesars Palace, Paradise
- Top Club (Based on attendance): 9:30 Club, Washington, D.C.
- Top Amphitheater: Hollywood Bowl, Los Angeles
- Top Promoter: Live Nation
- Top Independent Promoter (U.S.): C3 Presents, Austin, Texas
- Top Independent Promoter (International): T4F, São Paulo, Brazil
- Top Agency: Creative Artists Agency
- Top Manager: Creative Artists Agency
- Creative Content Award: Yo Gabba Gabba Live!
- Concert Marketing & Promotion Award: Lady Gaga/Virgin Mobile
- Humanitarian Award: Jack Johnson
- Eventful Fan's Choice: Metallica
- Legend of Live: Rush

=== 2009 ===
The sixth annual Billboard Touring Awards took place November 4 and 5, 2009, at the Roosevelt Hotel in New York City. The winners were:

- Top Tour: Madonna, Sticky & Sweet Tour
- Top Draw: Madonna, Sticky & Sweet Tour
- Top Package: Kenny Chesney, Sun City Carnival Tour with Miranda Lambert, Lady Antebellum, Sugarland and Montgomery Gentry
- Breakthrough: Il Divo
- Top Comedy Tour: Dane Cook, Globo Thermo Tour 2009
- Top Boxscore: U2 360° Tour at Croke Park in Dublin
- Top Festival: Oxegen at Naas, County Kildare, Ireland
- Top Arena: O2 arena, London
- Top Venue (Under 10,000 seats): Radio City Music Hall, New York City
- Top Venue (Under 5,000 seats): The Colosseum at Caesars Palace, Paradise
- Top Club: 9:30 Club, Washington, D.C.
- Top Amphitheatre: Comcast Center, Mansfield, Massachusetts
- Top Promoter: Live Nation
- Top Independent Promoter (U.S.): Jam Productions, Chicago
- Top Independent Promoter (International): Time For Fun, São Paulo, Brazil
- Top Manager: Guy Oseary (Madonna's manager)
- Concert Marketing & Promotion Award: Keith Urban, Escape Together World Tour 2009 with KC Masterpiece & Kingsford
- Top Agency: Creative Artists Agency
- Humanitarian: Kevin Lyman, creator of the Warped Tour
- Eventful Fans' Choice Award: Jonas Brothers World Tour 2009
- Legend of Live: Ozzy Osbourne

=== 2008 ===
The fifth annual Billboard Touring Awards took place November 20, 2008 in New York City.

- Top Tour: Bruce Springsteen and the E Street Band, Magic Tour
- Top Draw: Bruce Springsteen and the E Street Band, Magic Tour
- Fans Choice: Kenny Chesney, Poets and Pirates Tour
- Top Package: Kenny Chesney, Poets and Pirates Tour
- Breakthrough: Miley Cyrus, Hannah Montana/Miley Cyrus Best of Both Worlds Tour
- Top Boxscore: Spice Girls, Return of the Spice Girls, O2 arena, London, December 15 – January 22 (17 shows)
- Top Comedy Tour: Katt Williams
- Top Festival: Bonnaroo Music Festival
- Top Arena: Madison Square Garden
- Top Amphitheater: Comcast Center in Mansfield, Mass.
- Top Venue (Under 10,000 seats): Radio City Music Hall, New York City
- Top Venue (Under 5,000 seats): The Colosseum at Caesars Palace
- Top Club: House of Blues, Dallas
- Concert Marketing & Promotion: Jonas Brothers/Burger King, Burning Up Tour
- Creative Content: Walking with Dinosaurs – the Live Experience Tour
- Humanitarian: Jon Bon Jovi/Philadelphia Soul Charitable Foundation
- Road Warrior: Widespread Panic
- Legend of Live: The Allman Brothers Band

=== 2007 ===
The 2007 awards were held on November 15, 2007. Awards were based on box office performance from January 1, 2007, through September 30, 2007.

| Top Tour: The Police Reunion Tour – The Police‡; FutureSex/LoveShow – Justin Timberlake; Turn It On Again: The Tour – Genesis | Top Draw: The Police Reunion Tour – The Police‡; FutureSex/LoveShow – Justin Timberlake; Flip Flop Summer Tour – Kenny Chesney |
| Top Package: Flip Flop Summer Tour – Kenny Chesney with Sugarland, Pat Green, Brooks & Dunn and Sara Evans‡; Back to Basics Tour – Christina Aguilera with The Pussycat Dolls and Danity Kane; Soul2Soul II Tour – Tim McGraw and Faith Hill with Lori McKenna, Halfway to Hazard, Lance Miller and Taylor Swift | Breakthrough Artist: Justin Timberlake‡; Christina Aguilera; Maná |
| Top Boxscore: The Earth Tour: 21 Nights in London – Prince at The O_{2} Arena, London, United Kingdom‡; Bonnaroo Music Festival at the Great Stage Park, Manchester, Tennessee, United States; Download Festival at the Donington Park, Castle Donington, United Kingdom | Concert Marketing & Promotion Award: Jeep for Soul2Soul II Tour – Tim McGraw and Faith Hill‡; BlackBerry for 2007 Tour – John Mayer; The Hershey Company for Bonfires & Amplifiers Tour – Brad Paisley; Jägermeister for Ozzfest; U.S. Cellular for Summerfest; Verizon Wireless for Verizon VIP Tour – Fergie |
| Top Arena: Madison Square Garden, New York City, United States‡; Air Canada Centre, Toronto, Canada; Bell Centre, Montreal, Canada | Top Amphitheatre: Red Rocks Amphitheatre, Morrison, Colorado, United States‡; Greek Theatre, Los Angeles, United States; Tweeter Center for the Performing Arts, Mansfield, Massachusetts, United States |
| Top Club: 9:30 Club, Washington, D.C., United States‡; The Fillmore, Denver, United States; The Fillmore, San Francisco, United States | Top Festival: Download Festival at the Donington Park, Castle Donington, United Kingdom‡; Bonnaroo Music Festival at the Great Stage Park, Manchester, Tennessee, United States; Lollapalooza at the Grant Park, Chicago, United States |
| Top Venue Under 10,000 Seats (Resident): The Colosseum at Caesars Palace, Las Vegas, United States‡ | Top Venue Under 10,000 Seats (Non-Resident): Auditorio Nacional, Mexico City, Mexico‡; Fox Theatre, Atlanta, United States; Gibson Amphitheater at Universal Citywalk, Universal City, California, United States |
| Top Comedy Tour: Larry the Cable Guy‡; George Lopez; Katt Williams | Top Agency: Creative Arts Agency‡; Artist Group International; William Morris Agency |
| Top Promoter: Live Nation‡; AEG Live; CIE | Top Independent Promoter: C3 Presents (Austin, Texas)‡; JAM Productions (Chicago); Outback Concerts (Nashville) |
| Humanitarian Award: Kevin Wall | Legend of Live: Frank Barsalona, founder of Premier Entertainment |

=== 2006 ===
The 2006 awards were held on November 9, 2006, in New York City.

| Top Tour: A Bigger Bang Tour – The Rolling Stones‡; Confessions Tour – Madonna; Have a Nice Day Tour – Bon Jovi | Top Draw: A Bigger Bang Tour – The Rolling Stones‡; Confessions Tour – Madonna; Have a Nice Day Tour – Bon Jovi |
| Top Package: The Road and the Radio Tour – Kenny Chesney with Dierks Bentley, Sugarland, Carrie Underwood and Jake Owen‡; Me & My Gang Tour – Rascal Flatts with Gary Allan and Jason Aldean; YEAH! Tour – Def Leppard and Journey with Stoll Vaughan | Top Boxscore: Confessions Tour – Madonna at the Wembley Arena, London, United Kingdom‡; Billy Joel at the Garden – Billy Joel at the Madison Square Garden, New York City, United States; México En La Piel Tour – Luis Miguel at the Auditorio Nacional, Mexico City, Mexico |
| Breakthrough Act: Nickelback‡; Brad Paisley; Shakira | Top Comedy Tour: Larry the Cable Guy‡; Jerry Seinfeld; Ron White |
| Top Arena: Madison Square Garden, New York City, United States‡; TD Banknorth Garden, Boston, United States; Wachovia Center, Philadelphia, United States | Top Amphitheater: Nikon at Jones Beach Theater, Wantagh, New York, United States‡; PNC Bank Arts Center, Holmdel Township, New Jersey, United States; Tweeter Center at the Waterfront, Camden, New Jersey, United States |
| Top Small Venue (Resident): The Colosseum at Caesars Palace, Las Vegas, United States‡ | Top Small Venue (Non-Resident): Fox Theatre, Atlanta, United States‡; Auditorio Nacional, Mexico City, Mexico; Gibson Amphitheater, Universal City, California, United States |
| Top Club: House of Blues, Atlantic City, New Jersey, United States‡; House of Blues, Anaheim, California, United States; House of Blues, Chicago, United States | Top Festival: Bonnaroo Music Festival at the Great Stage Park, Manchester, Tennessee, United States‡; Austin City Limits Music Festival at the Zilker Park, Austin, Texas, United States; Lollapalooza at the Grant Park, Chicago, United States |
| Top Manager: Angela Becker and Guy Oseary (Madonna)‡; Front Line Management; RPM Management/Borman Entertainment; Paul Korzilius of BJM (Bon Jovi) | Top Agency: Creative Artists Agency‡; Monterey Peninsula Artists/Paradigm; William Morris Agency |
| Top Promoter: Live Nation‡; AEG Live; HOB Concerts | Top Independent Promoter: Jam Productions‡; Gillett Entertainment Group; Outback Concerts |
| Creative Content Award: Delirium – Cirque du Soleil‡ | Humanitarian Award: Music Rising |
Legend of Live: Sir Elton John

=== 2005 ===
The 2005 awards were termed the Billboard Roadworks '05 Touring Awards.

| Top Tour: Vertigo Tour – U2‡; A Place in the Sun – Kenny Chesney; Neil Diamond Live – Neil Diamond | Top Draw: U2‡; Kenny Chesney; Dave Matthews Band |
| Top Package: Somewhere in the Sun Tour – Kenny Chesney with Gretchen Wilson, Uncle Kracker and Pat Green‡; Anger Management Tour (3rd Edition) – Eminem with 50 Cent, Lil Jon & the East Side Boyz, G-Unit, D12, Obie Trice, Stat Quo, Lil Scrappy, Pitbull and Ludacris; Ozzfest | Top Small Venue Tour: Devils & Dust Tour – Bruce Springsteen‡; Afterglow Live – Sarah McLachlan; Shangri-La – Mark Knopfler |
| Breakthrough Act: Rascal Flatts‡; Coldplay | Top Boxscore: Vertigo Tour – U2 at the Croke Park, Dublin, Ireland (June 24–27)‡; Vertigo Tour – U2 at the Twickenham Stadium, London, United Kingdom (June 18–19); Bonnaroo Music Festival at the Great Stage Park, Manchester, Tennessee, United States (June 10–12) |
| Top Arena: Madison Square Garden, New York City, United States‡; Wachovia Center, Philadelphia, United States; Continental Airlines Arena, East Rutherford, New Jersey, United States | Top Amphitheater: Tweeter Center for the Performing Arts, Mansfield, Massachusetts, United States‡; PNC Bank Arts Center, Holmdel Township, New Jersey, United States; Tommy Hilfiger at Jones Beach Theater, Wantagh, New York, United States |
| Top Small Venue (non-resident booking): Fox Theatre, Atlanta, United States‡; Gibson Amphitheatre at Universal Citywalk, Universal City, California, United States; Radio City Music Hall, New York City, United States | Top Small Venue (resident booking): The Colosseum at Caesars Palace, Las Vegas, United States‡ |
| Top Club: House of Blues, Chicago, United States‡; 9:30 Club, Washington, D.C., United States; Vicar Street, Dublin, Ireland | Top Festival: Bonnaroo Music Festival at the Great Stage Park, Manchester, Tennessee, United States‡; Lollapalooza at the Grant Park, Chicago, United States |
| Top Manager: Principle Management‡; Front Line Management; Dale Morris & Associates | Top Promoter: Clear Channel Entertainment‡; AEG Live; House of Blues Concerts |
| Top Promoter: JAM Productions, Chicago, United States‡; Outback Concerts, Nashville, United States; Aiken Promotions, Dublin, Ireland | Top Agency: William Morris Agency‡; Creative Artists Agency; Howard Rose Agency |
| Humanitarian Award: Dave Matthews Band‡ | Legend of Live Award: Jack Boyle of Cellar Door Concerts‡ |

=== 2004 ===
The first annual Billboard Touring Awards were held November 8–9, 2004, at the Roosevelt Hotel in New York City, as the culmination of the first Billboard Backstage Pass Conference. The winners were announced in advance of the awards ceremony. The awards were not well known or publicized much during this time.

- Top Tour: Madonna, Re-Invention World Tour
- Top Draw Award: Prince, Musicology Tour
- Top Small Venue Tour: Josh Groban
- Breakthrough: Linkin Park
- Top Boxscore: Red Hot Chili Peppers, By the Way tour, Hyde Park, London
- Top Arena: Madison Square Garden, New York City
- Top Amphitheater: Tweeter Center for the Performing Arts, Mansfield, Massachusetts
- Top Club: House of Blues, Chicago
- Top Festival: Bonnaroo Music Festival, Manchester, Tennessee
- Top Manager: Caresse Henry (for Madonna)
- Top Promoter: Clear Channel Entertainment
- Top Indy Promoter: Jam Productions
- Top Agency: Creative Artists Agency
- Humanitarian: Clear Channel Entertainment
- Legend of Live: Michael Cohl
