= Project Pabst =

- Locations: Zidell Yards near Ross Island Bridge; 3030 SW Moody Ave; Portland, OR 97201
- Years active: 2014, 2015–present
- Sponsors: Pabst Brewing Company, StubHub
- Website: projectpabst.com

Project Pabst is a music festival that takes place in Portland, Oregon in the United States. The first two editions of the festival were held in September 2014 and July 2015. The festival is produced by Superfly and sponsored by both Pabst Brewing Company and StubHub.

== Location and Format ==
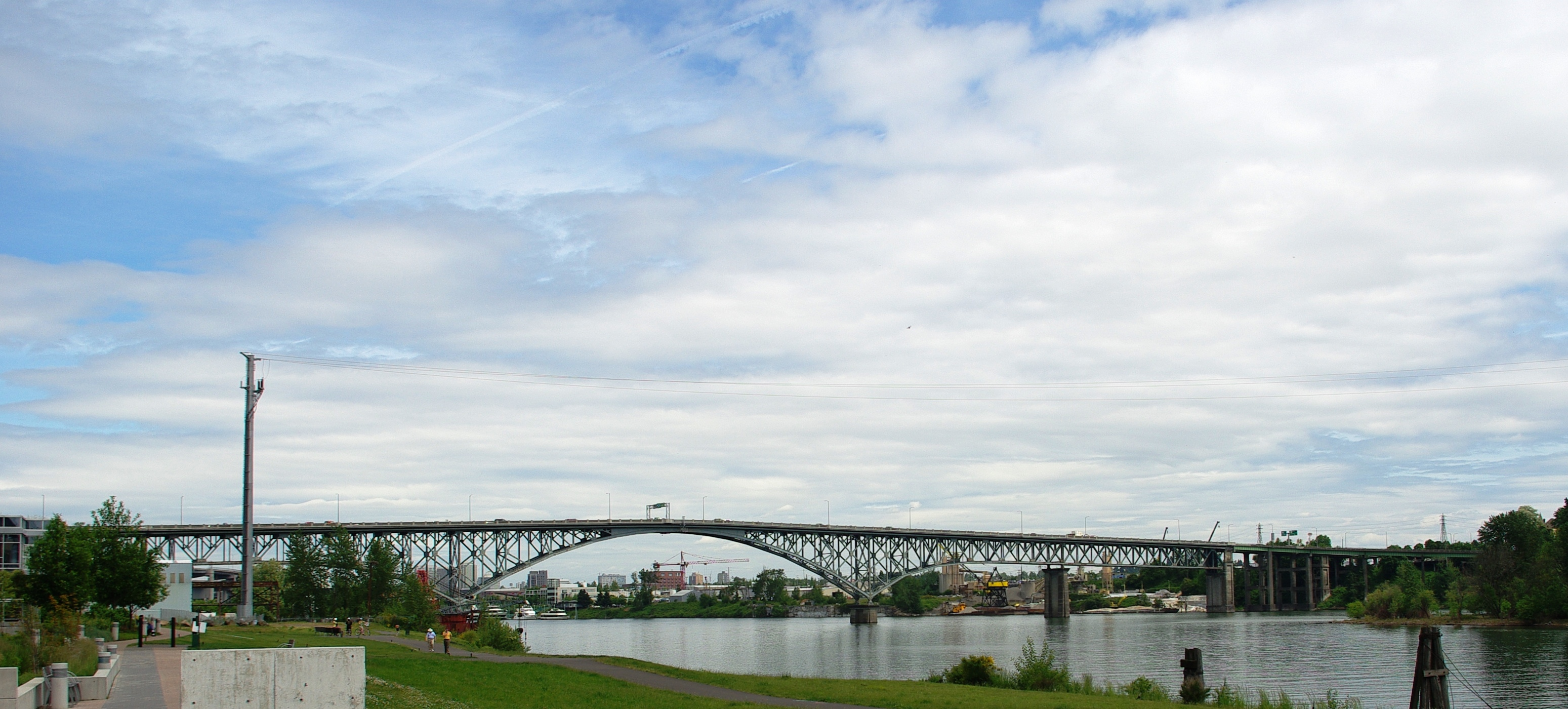
Ross Island Bridge in Portland, OR

The Project Pabst festival takes place near the Ross Island Bridge on Portland's South Waterfront. The exact location is at 3030 SW Moody Ave, Portland, OR 97201. There are two main stages on 10 acres in Portland's South Waterfront near the restored Zidell Yards. In 2015, the festival ran for two days on Saturday, July 18 and Sunday, July 19. For both the 2014 and the 2015 festival, the basic format of consisted of 8 bands each day spanned across the two stages, so 16 bands total.

Pabst encourages all attendees to walk, bike, or skate. Since Portland is very economically friendly parking is limited at the event. Project Pabst has a Park to Walk program where they have a parking garage specifically for the event you can pay to park and walk 1.2 miles to the event. They also have valet parking for bikes and skateboards only.

== History ==
Pabst Blue Ribbon beer was established in Milwaukee, Wisconsin in 1844, by a German immigrant, Jacob Bests. Throughout the years Pabst beer went through a decline in popularity and their sales were plummeting. However, Portland, Oregon played an integral part in bringing the American beer back to life. Since the 1970s, Pabst had seen a decline in their sales until the early 2000s, when their sales started going up again. Portland was sourced as being one of the main proponents of this change. Pabst became very popular due to its image as a cheap, working class, beer that did not try to buy their way with excessive advertisements.

In creating the Project Pabst festival, Pabst Brewing Company hoped for it to be a "love letter to Portland". In their initial ideas for the logo of the festival, they made the Portland's Old Town sign into their Project Pabst logo. Portland’s Old Town sign is an outline of the State of Oregon with “Portland, Oregon Old Town,” written in the middle. At the top of the sign, there is a giant deer jumping over the logo. The deer represents Oregon since deer live all over the state. Pabst liked the idea of the sign and made a similar one with the outline of the state of Oregon and their logo is “Project Pabst Portland Oregon.” Instead of using the deer in the logo, though, they decided to make it a unicorn instead. That day, Pepper, the Pabst Blue Ribbon Unicorn was born. Portland’s city board was unsure of the logo though, and they ended up turning Pabst down and pushing the dates back of when they would accept it. There was some controversy behind this decision though and the rejected sign was still used throughout the 2014 Project Pabst festival.

Project Pabst Unicorn is a symbol Pabst Brewing Company created six weeks before the Project Pabst event. They had a huge team creating the 22 foot Unicorn, which stood at the center of the festival. PBR, Figure Plant, Superfly, and David Korins design all came up with the idea of having a unicorn and they helped design Pepper, the giant Unicorn statue, with a light up horn that lights up the colors of the rainbow. There's a myth in Portland that the city was built on a Unicorn burial site and that it used to be the “city of Unicorns.”

== Lineup ==
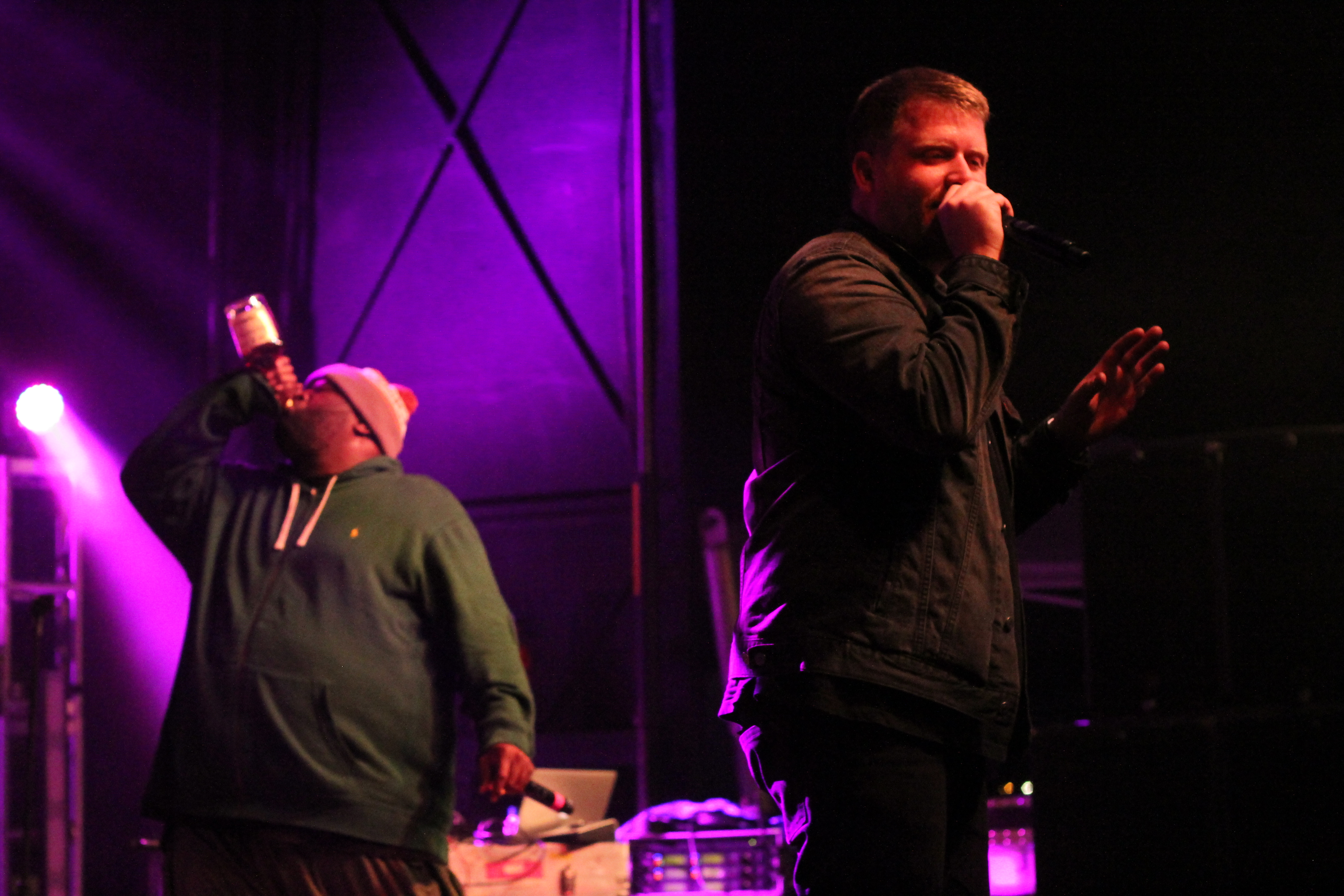
Killer Mike and El-P of Run The Jewels

The headliners for the 2014 festival were Modest Mouse and Tears for Fears. For 2015, the main headlining bands were: Weezer, Against Me!, and Run the Jewels. The full lineup of bands for the 2015 show was:

- Blondie
- TV on the Radio
- Against Me!
- Run the Jewels
- Thee Oh Sees
- The Velvet Teen
- Priory
- Hustle and Drone
- Weezer
- Passion Pit
- Buzzcocks
- The Both (Aimee Man/ Ted Leo)
- Alvvays
- Terry and Louie
- Wampire
- Wild Ones

== Night Shows ==
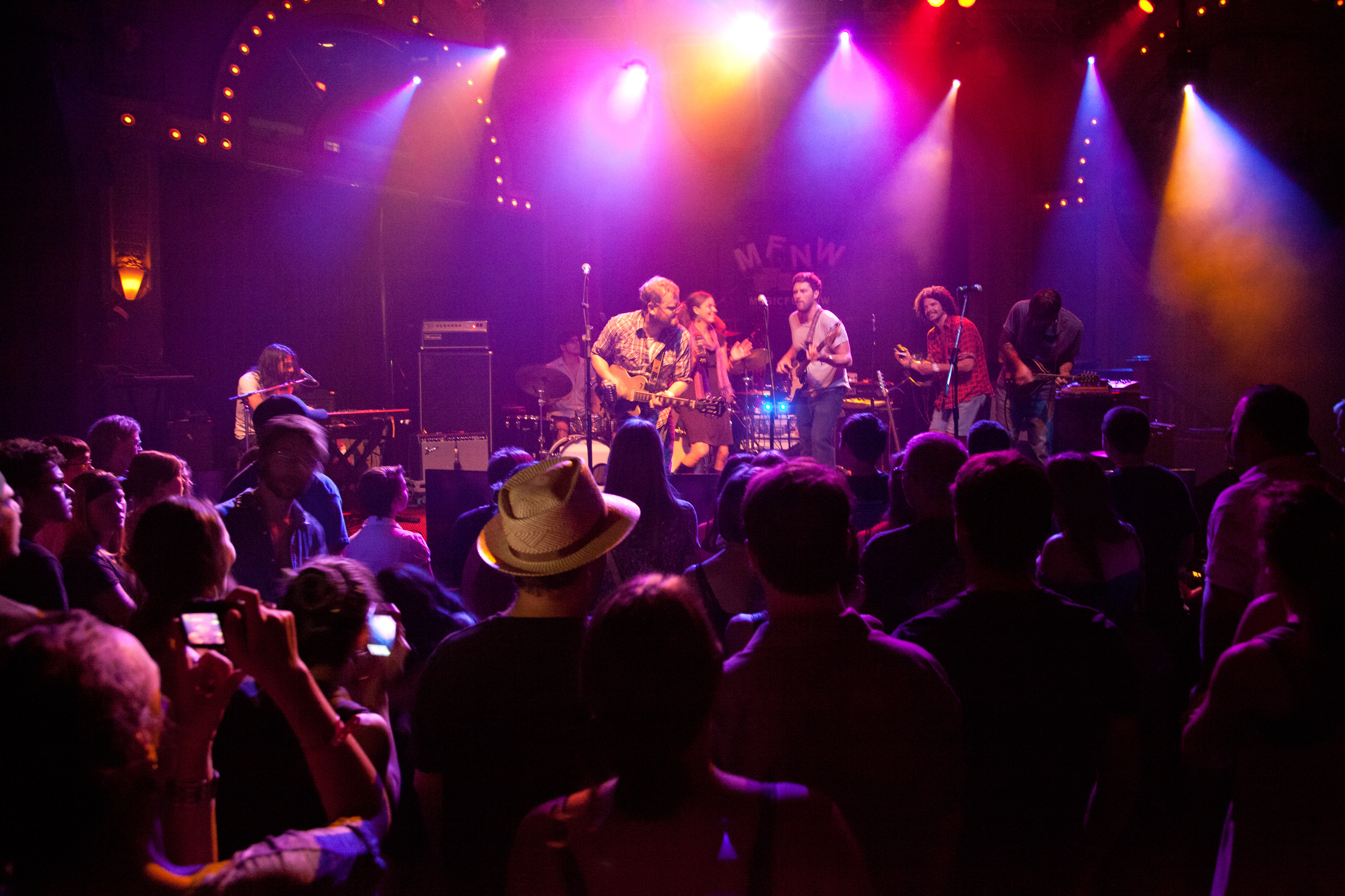
Inside Portland's Crystal Ballroom

Project Pabst 2015 also incorporated a handful of night shows at other venues in the Portland area to the festival. These shows ran at night from July 16–19, 2015 after the daytime festival had finished. These night shows and their venues included:

=== Crystal Ballroom ===
Saturday - BadBadNotGood, Ghostface Killah, and Del the Funky Homosapien

=== Dante’s ===
Friday - The Spits, The Epoxies, Long Knife

Saturday - Oblivians, Pure Country Gold, Bobby Peru

Sunday - The Mummies, Gaythiest, Sex Crime

=== Star Theater ===
Friday - The Sonics, Pierced Arrows, Fireballs of Freedom

Saturday - Roky Erickson, The Pynnacles, Hollow Sidewalks

=== Revolution Hall ===
Friday - Preservation Hall Jazz Band, Son Little

Saturday - Earth (American band)

=== Doug Fir ===
Thursday - Brian Posehn, Bryan Cook, Sean Jordan

Friday - Shannon and the Clams, Chastity Belt, The Shivas

Saturday - Fernando, Jeremy Wilson, Mike Coykendall

=== Mississippi Studios ===
Friday - Tacocat, The Ghost Ease, Shadowlands

Saturday - The Coathangers, Is/Is, Marriage + Cancer

=== Ash St. Saloon ===
Friday - Jex Thoth, Ides of Gemini, Clay Rendering, Barrowlands

Saturday - Subrosa, Brothers of the Sonic Cloth, Lesbian, Eight Bells

=== Bunk Bar ===
Friday - Chrome

== Activities ==
Aside from the live bands, there are a number of entertainment activities set up on the festival grounds. These activities are open to any and all people attending the Project Pabst festival.

=== PBRcade ===
In an attempt to emulate the bar-like atmosphere in which Pabst has built their empire, a small bar is set up on the festival grounds for attendees to take a break in. The bar houses pinball machines, arcade games, and local music. All games are completely free to play.

=== Pabst VANdalism ===
The Pabst Van is set up on the festival premises and is treated as a communal art piece. Festival attendees are encouraged to use spray paint to decorate the van in whatever manner they please.

=== Pabst Wax ===
In this small recording booth, attendees can jump in and create their own music. These recording are then cut directly into vinyl and people can walk away with their own record demo.

=== #NoMoFoMo ===
This booth stands for No More Fear of Missing Out. In it, there is a live DJ booth set up where festival attendees can watch and listen to performances as well as connect with social media. This booth is sponsored by StubHub.

=== Food ===
Local food vendors at the festival include: Atlas Pizza, Boke Bowl, Fifty Licks Ice Cream, Olympic Provisions and Slowburger.

== Reception ==
Project Pabst was received well by fans and deemed a success in the eyes of Pabst Brewing Company. With temperatures around 100 degrees for the 2015 edition, 15,000 fans attended over the two-day festival. Weezer, Against Me!, Blondie, and Run The Jewels were among the 2015 lineup. Amid the high temperatures, Project Pabst allowed sealed water bottles to be brought into the festival and included on-site refills. Limiting water and inflating prices on water is common at festivals, with the average cost of a bottle of water at festivals in 2014 being $4 and the average cost of a beer being $8.50. 16oz Tallboys of Pabst Blue Ribbon cost $4 at the Project Pabst, more than the cost at a bar, but less than half of what most festivals would charge.

== Impact ==
Project Pabst was produced by the relatively new festival producer, Superfly. Superfly co-produced the most recent Bonnaroo and Outside Lands festivals. Pabst Brewing Company was expecting 10,000 attendees over the two-day Project Pabst festival and instead saw 15,000. The festival ended up costing around 12 percent of their annual marketing budget. As a result, Pabst Brewing Company saw an increase of 25,000 cases of Pabst sold this year in the Portland market.

== See also ==
- Culture of Portland, Oregon
- List of festivals in the United States
  - List of music festivals in the United States
