= WWE in Brazil =

- Created by: Vince McMahon
- Promotions: WWE
- Brands: Raw
- First event: 2012 tour

WWE, an American professional wrestling promotion based in Stamford, Connecticut, promoted its first and only event in Brazil in 2012. The event was held in São Paulo as part of the WWE Raw World Tour and marked the company’s official debut in the country.

Some Brazilian wrestlers that competed for WWE include Giant Silva, Arturo Ruas, Cezar Bononi, Taynara Conti and Valentina Feroz.

== 2012 Tour ==
In 2011, WWE announced in a press release that it would be holding two live events in Brazil as part of the Raw World Tour. The shows were to be held by Time For Fun at Ginásio do Ibirapuera, São Paulo and Ginásio do Maracanãzinho, Rio de Janeiro on 23 and 24 May 2012 respectively. However, in April 2012, Time For Fun announced that the Rio de Janeiro show at the Maracanãzinho had been cancelled and would not go ahead despite rescheduling efforts.

To promote the upcoming tour, WWE sent The Miz to Brazil, where he appeared on the late-night talk show Agora É Tarde. WWE's initial plan was to fly from Virginia, where they held the previous Raw on 21 May but due to the aircraft requiring maintenance, the flight had to be delayed until the next day. WWE made the decision to reschedule to event for 24 May.

In the main event Chris Jericho wrestled a match against CM Punk, during which Jericho kicked a Brazilian flag causing local police to intervene and threaten Jericho with arrest. Jericho issued an apology to the audience, enabling the event to resume. The following day, WWE suspended Jericho for 30 days while apologizing to the people and government of Brazil. As of 2026, WWE has not returned to Brazil since the incident.

=== Results ===
No.	Results	Stipulations	Times
1	Brodus Clay (with Cameron and Naomi) defeated JTG	Singles match	—
2	David Otunga defeated Alex Riley	Singles match	—
3	Michael McGillicutty defeated Curt Hawkins	Singles match	—
4	Zack Ryder defeated The Miz	Singles match	—
5	Kofi Kingston and R-Truth (c) defeated Primo and Epico	Tag team match for the WWE Tag Team Championship	—
6	Beth Phoenix defeated Kelly Kelly	Singles match	—
7	John Cena defeated Dolph Ziggler (with Mason Ryan)	Singles match	14:40
8	CM Punk (c) defeated Chris Jericho	No Disqualification match for the WWE Championship	16:12
(c) / – the champion(s) heading into the match
