= The Melancholy Tour =

2025 concert tour by Japanese Breakfast

- Tour by Japanese Breakfast
- Location: North America, Europe, Australia, New Zealand and Asia
- Associated album: For Melancholy Brunettes (& Sad Women)
- Start date: April 12, 2025
- End date: September 10, 2025
- Legs: 6
- No. of shows: 58

Japanese Breakfast concert chronology
- Jubilee Tour (2021-2023); The Melancholy Tour

The Melancholy Tour was the fourth headlining tour from American indie rock musician Japanese Breakfast.

== Background ==
On January 7, 2025, Japanese Breakfast announced their fourth full-length album titled For Melancholy Brunettes (& Sad Women). Alongside the announcement, Japanese Breakfast announced tour dates in support of the album across North America, Australia, New Zealand, Asia, and Europe. Japanese Breakfast announced that indie soul musician Ginger Root would be opening the North American portion of the tour and Minhwi Lee would be opening the overseas portion of the tour.

== Set list ==
This set list is representative of the show in Philadelphia, Pennsylvania on May 15, 2025. It is not representative of all concerts for the duration of the tour.

1. Here Is Someone
2. Orlando In Love
3. Honey Water
4. Road Head
5. Boyish (Little Big League cover)
6. The Body Is a Blade
7. Mega Circuit
8. Leda
9. The Woman That Loves You
10. Slide Tackle
11. Picture Window
12. Winter in LA
13. Kokomo, IN
14. Men in Bars
15. Magic Mountain
16. Playground Love (Air cover)
17. Posing in Bondage
18. Paprika
19. Be Sweet
20. Diving Woman

== Tour dates ==
List of concerts, showing date, city, country, venue, and opening acts
| Date | City | Country | Venue | Opening acts |
Leg 1 – North America
| April 12, 2025 | Indio | United States | Coachella | —N/a |
| April 19, 2025 | Indio | United States | Coachella | —N/a |
| April 23, 2025 | Austin | United States | Moody Theater | Ginger Root |
| April 24, 2025 | Dallas | United States | South Side Ballroom | Ginger Root |
| April 26, 2025 | Atlanta | United States | Tabernacle | Ginger Root |
| April 27, 2025 | Charlotte | United States | The Fillmore | Ginger Root |
| April 28, 2025 | Nashville | United States | Ryman Auditorium | Ginger Root |
| April 30, 2025 | Chicago | United States | The Salt Shed | Ginger Root |
| May 1, 2025 | Chicago | United States | The Salt Shed | Ginger Root |
| May 2, 2025 | Chicago | United States | The Salt Shed | Ginger Root |
| May 3, 2025 | Detroit | United States | The Fillmore | Ginger Root |
| May 5, 2025 | Toronto | Canada | Massey Hall | Ginger Root |
| May 6, 2025 | Toronto | Canada | Massey Hall | Ginger Root |
| May 7, 2025 | Boston | United States | MGM Music Hall at Fenway | Ginger Root |
| May 9, 2025 | Brooklyn | United States | Brooklyn Paramount | Ginger Root |
| May 10, 2025 | Brooklyn | United States | Brooklyn Paramount | Ginger Root |
| May 11, 2025 | Brooklyn | United States | Brooklyn Paramount | Ginger Root |
| May 12, 2025 | Brooklyn | United States | Brooklyn Paramount | Ginger Root |
| May 15, 2025 | Philadelphia | United States | Metropolitan Opera House | Ginger Root |
| May 16, 2025 | Philadelphia | United States | Metropolitan Opera House | Ginger Root |
Leg 2 – Australia and New Zealand
| June 3, 2025 | Sydney | Australia | Sydney Opera House | —N/a |
| June 5, 2025 | Melbourne | Australia | Port Melbourne Industrial Centre for the Arts | —N/a |
| June 7, 2025 | Auckland | New Zealand | Auckland Town Hall | —N/a |
Leg 3 – Asia
| June 11, 2025 | Tokyo | Japan | Zepp Shinjuku | —N/a |
| June 13, 2025 | Osaka | Japan | Club Quattro | —N/a |
| June 15, 2025 | Cheorwon County | South Korea | DMZ Peace Train Music Festival | —N/a |
Leg 4 – North America
| June 21, 2025 | Milwaukee | United States | Summerfest | —N/a |
Leg 5 – Europe
| June 24, 2025 | Oslo | Norway | Rockefeller Oslo | Minhwi Lee |
| June 25, 2025 | Stockholm | Sweden | Filadelfiakyrkan | Minhwi Lee |
| June 26, 2025 | Copenhagen | Denmark | Vega | Minhwi Lee |
| June 28, 2025 | Pilton | England | Glastonbury Festival | —N/a |
| June 29, 2025 | Manchester | England | Manchester Academy | Minhwi Lee |
| June 30, 2025 | Glasgow | Scotland | Barrowland Ballroom | Minhwi Lee |
| July 1, 2025 | Bristol | England | O2 Academy Bristol | Minhwi Lee |
| July 3, 2025 | London | England | O2 Academy Brixton | Minhwi Lee |
| July 5, 2025 | Utrecht | Netherlands | TivoliVredenburg | Minhwi Lee |
| July 6, 2025 | Ewijk | Netherlands | Down the Rabbit Hole | —N/a |
| July 8, 2025 | Paris | France | Le Trianon | Minhwi Lee |
| July 10, 2025 | Bilbao | Spain | Bilbao BBK Live | Minhwi Lee |
Leg 6 – North America
| July 27, 2025 | Portland | United States | Project Pabst | —N/a |
| August 21, 2025 | Pioneertown | United States | Pappy & Harriet's | Hand Habits |
| August 23, 2025 | Santa Barbara | United States | Santa Barbara Bowl | Ginger Root |
| August 27, 2025 | San Francisco | United States | SF Masonic Auditorium | Ginger Root |
| August 28, 2025 | San Francisco | United States | SF Masonic Auditorium | Ginger Root |
| August 29, 2025 | Sacramento | United States | Channel 24 | Ginger Root |
| August 30, 2025 | Bend | United States | Hayden Homes Amphitheater | Ginger Root |
| September 1, 2025 | Vancouver | Canada | Orpheum Theatre | Ginger Root |
| September 2, 2025 | Seattle | United States | Woodland Park Zoo | Ginger Root |
| September 3, 2025 | Seattle | United States | Woodland Park Zoo | Ginger Root |
| September 5, 2025 | Salt Lake City | United States | Twilight Concert Series | Ginger Root, Tomper |
| September 6, 2025 | Denver | United States | Mission Ballroom | Ginger Root |
| September 8, 2025 | Lawrence | United States | Liberty Hall | Ginger Root |
| September 9, 2025 | St. Paul | United States | Palace Theatre | Ginger Root |
| September 10, 2025 | Madison | United States | The Sylvee | Ginger Root |
| October 5, 2025 | Bentonville | United States | The Montgomery | —N/a |
| October t, 2025 | St. Louis | United States | The Pageant | —N/a |
| October 5, 2025 | Oklahoma City | United States | The Criterion | —N/a |
| October 5, 2025 | New Orleans | United States | Joy Theater | —N/a |
