= Qualistage =

Music venue in Rio de Janeiro

- Interactive map of Qualistage
- Former names: Metropolitan (1994–2000); (2016-17); ATL Hall (2000–03); Claro Hall (2003–07); Citibank Hall (2007–17); Km de Vantagens Hall (2017–21)
- Address: Avenida Ayrton Senna, 3000; Rio de Janeiro - RJ; 22775-000; Brazil
- Location: Via Parque Shopping
- Coordinates: 22.9854571°S 43.3659894°W
- Operator: Time For Fun
- Capacity: 8,450

Construction
- Opened: September 1994

Qualistage is a music venue, in the city of Rio de Janeiro, Brazil. The venue has a capacity of 8,450 spectators, but can have four different configurations. Located in Barra da Tijuca, it is one of the major show houses of Rio de Janeiro.

== Name changes ==
It was opened in September 1994, with the name of Metropolitan. In late 2000, after a naming rights agreement, it was renamed as ATL Hall, and as Claro Hall after the consolidation of the América Móvil-owned networks in Brazil, and since March 2007, when the Claro agreement expired, becoming the Citibank Hall. In 2016, the concert hall briefly returned to its original name. In March 2017, naming rights were purchased by fuel company, Ipiranga, with the venue now known as KM de Vantagens Hall. In 2021, the space was renamed again, this time with the name Qualistage, due to the partnership with the health plan administrator Qualicorp.
