= Papst =

Papst may refer to:

- the German word for Pope
- ebm-papst, manufacturer of fans

== See also ==
- Pabst
