= Superfly (company) =

American marketing and event company

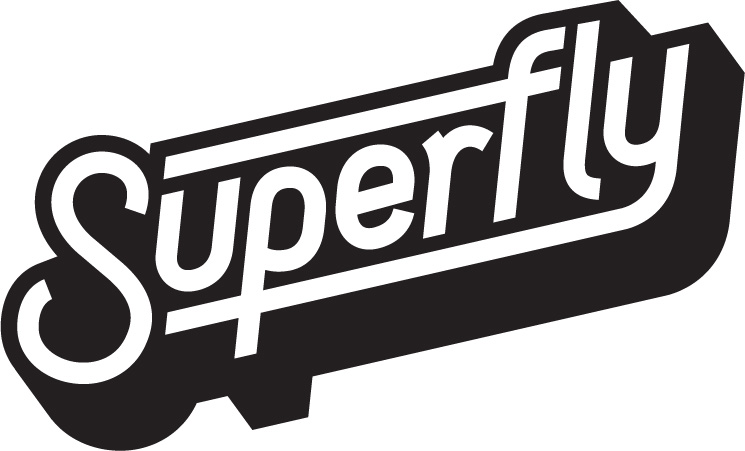
- Formerly: Superfly Presents
- Type: Private
- Industry: Entertainment Marketing
- Founded: 1996 in New Orleans
- Founders: Kerry Black; Rick Farman; Richard Goodstone; Jonathan Mayers
- Headquarters: New York
- Brands: Bonnaroo Music and Arts Festival; Outside Lands Music and Arts Festival; Cocktail Magic
- Website: www.superf.ly

Superfly is a New York-based marketing and event company. Founded in New Orleans in 1996 as a Superfly Presents, they produce and co-created Outside Lands Music and Arts Festival and previously owned and produced the Bonnaroo Music and Arts Festival. A marketing division was established in 2009, and in 2014 the company name was shortened to Superfly.

Held on a 700-acre farm in Manchester, Tennessee annually since 2002, Bonnaroo draws a yearly audience of approximately 80,000 people. Most of the attendees camp on-site during the four day festival, which was designed to emphasize community. NPR wrote that "Bonnaroo, which books with ambition and a genre diversity in mind, put most other fests to shame," and Rolling Stone included the festival on its list of the"50 Moments that Changed Rock and Roll."

Outside Lands takes place yearly in San Francisco's Golden Gate Park, and with a diverse lineup of performers, art installations, and a focus on sustainability, it was designed to mirror the culture of the city. Food and wine is a central component of Outside Lands, which in 2015 included 78 restaurants, 32 breweries, 37 winemakers and 120 wines. With an attendance of approximately 65,000 on each of its three days, the festival has sold out consistently since it was launched in 2002. In 2014, 2015, and 2016, three-day ticket packages sold out within the first 24 hours they were available.

The Superfly Marketing Group (SMG) was founded as a division of Superfly in 2009. It has developed campaigns, promotions and marketing platforms for companies including Pabst, JetBlue, Yahoo! and Intel. They acquired the Chicago-based creative agency The Distillery in 2014.

The company has implemented sustainability and economic growth programs at Bonnaroo and Outside Lands, and has partnered with non-profits including Oxfam. In 2013, Superfly established Well Dunn, an organization which provides financial support to students interested in careers in the entertainment industry, allowing them to participate in internships they would be otherwise unable to afford.

== History ==
=== Beginnings: 1996–2001 ===
Superfly was founded in 1996 in New Orleans by Kerry Black, Rick Farman, Rich Goodstone and Jonathan Mayers. Black, Farman and Mayers attended Tulane University; Goodstone had gone to high school with Mayers in Nyack, New York. Mayers completed his degree in 1995, and following his graduation, he was hired as the booking agent at Tipitina's, a New Orleans club. In exchange for concert tickets, Black helped with street promotions and Farman helped to run and market the shows.

Tipitinas was sold in 1995 and along with Goodstone, Black, Farman, and Mayers decided to start their own concert promotion company. It was initially a part-time pursuit; Mayers was working in production at Jazz Fest, Black and Farman were in college, and Goodstone lived in New York, where he worked in advertising. They focused on new and established jam bands at first; fans of the genre, they recognized that the jam band phenomenon was beginning to develop nationally. Mayers suggested they call the company Superfly Presents, inspired by the Curtis Mayfield soundtrack for the 1976 film Superfly.

Superfly planned to stage shows in clubs and theaters and on riverboats during major city events such as Mardi Gras to capitalize on the influx of visitors to New Orleans. New Orleans Jazz & Heritage Festival in particular offered a significant opportunity; performances ran until only 7 p.m. over two weekends, and an expanded audience of music fans were in New Orleans. To launch the company, they borrowed $20,000, mainly from family, and in March 1997 they promoted their first show, Take Funk to Heaven: Mardi Gras '97. Held at the New Orleans Contemporary Arts Center, then essentially a warehouse space, both nights of the two-night event sold out. Relying on grassroots marketing, they had similar success with a series of shows at venues which included clubs, theaters, warehouses, and riverboats. In 1999, Black and Farman graduated, Mayers quit Jazz Fest, Goodstone moved to New Orleans, and Superfly Presents became a full-time endeavor. In 2002, during Jazz Fest alone, Superfly staged 28 concerts over eight nights at eight New Orleans venues.

To compete with promoters including Clear Channel and the House of Blues, who promoted genre-specific shows, Superfly Presents booked artists who would not generally appear on the same bill, such as rock bands with jazz musicians and New Orleans bands with hip hop artists. They maintained a focus on jam bands, at that point a genre largely overlooked in New Orleans, and put individual musicians from different groups together as all-star bands. Described as "gritty, spontaneous, and wholly authentic," Superfly shows would frequently begin at 2 a.m. and end at sunrise. They promoted the events through word of mouth, print ads in alternative weeklies and college papers, and the internet, which was actively used by jam bands, and had 50 people doing grassroots marketing in 40 cities. The promotion was effective, as people "flocked to Jazz Fest as much for Superfly's after-hours scene as for the daytime festival itself."

=== 2002–2007: Bonnaroo, Vegoose ===
Superfly staged approximately 100 shows in 2001, and the company earned a reported $1 million. However, revenue was based mainly on ticket sales, which had limited potential. Black, Farman, Goodstone and Black drew from their experiences at the Coachella Festival and the Glastonbury Festival, and developed the Bonnaroo Music and Art Festival. A multi day music, art and entertainment event, which, like Glastonbury, included onsite camping, the first Bonnaroo was held in June 2002 in Manchester, Tennessee. Held on a 700-acre farm, it was financed in part by Coran Capshaw, who managed the Dave Matthews Band, among others, and produced in conjunction with Knoxville-based promoter A.C. Entertainment. The festival was announced on March 13. Tickets were sold exclusively through the Bonnaroo website, and without traditional advertising, 10,000 tickets were sold the day they went on sale, 70,000 were sold within the first week, and by March 24, based largely on word-of-mouth, the tickets had sold out. The inaugural Bonnaroo Music and Arts Festival took place June 21–23. Focused on jam bands and roots artists, performers included Widespread Panic, Trey Anastasio, and String Cheese Incident.

Superfly focused on developing an immersive experience and fostering community around the festival. The festival grounds operated 24 hours without a curfew, and included a taxi service, general store, daily newspaper, and a 24-hour cinema. A code of conduct, later formalized as "The Bonnaroovian Code," stated that one must "Prepare Thyself" and "Play As A Team" and to "Stay True to the Roo." Security guards wore shirts marked "Safety" rather than "Security." Early morning yoga and a 5K run were offered and an adult playground was constructed. Sponsorships were accepted only if they somehow enhanced the fan experience. For example, AT&T presented the Silent Disco, Garnier Fructis offered shampoos, and Ford presented "The Backyard," an air-conditioned tent with a performance stage, lawn-chair seating and picnic tables.

In October 2005, Superfly and AC Entertainment launched the Vegoose Festival. Set in Las Vegas, it was timed to coincide with Halloween. Mainly a music event, it additionally integrated local culture via celebrity impersonators and a wedding chapel. The first Vegoose brought 36,825 visitors to Las Vegas, with an estimated economic impact of $37.3 million, $30.4 million of which came from non-gaming revenue. The report noted that 16 percent of the out-of-state attendees made their first trip to Las Vegas for Vegoose. Two-day attendance in 2006 was down more than 50 percent, with a gate of 30,625, from 72,400 in 2005. Plans to hold Vegoose annually were cancelled in 2008.

In 2007, Superfly and A.C. Entertainment bought 530 acres of the Bonnaroo Festival site from its owner, Sam McAllister. A purchase price was not disclosed.

=== 2008–2013: Outside Lands, Superfly Marketing Group, Great GoogaMooga ===
In 2008, Superfly and Capshaw's Starr Hill Presents partnered with Another Planet Entertainment, a San Francisco-based promoter, to create the three day Outside Lands Music and Arts Festival. Set in Golden Gate Park, it was an idea that had first been discussed in 2004. Because the location required cooperation entities including the San Francisco Recreation and Parks, the SFMTA and various neighborhood associations it took more than three years to secure the site. The first major ticketed event in Golden Gate Park and the first event with nighttime performances, Outside Lands was designed to mirror its location in San Francisco. Stages were named after locations in the city, and the scrims surrounding the stages were done by hometown artists. San Francisco's foodie culture was emphasized via an emphasis on food and wine—in 2010, 99% of the food vendors were local, and most of the wines offered were produced by California vineyards. The bands that performed reflected the diversity of the city.

Environmental goals and action plans were instituted well in advance of Outside Lands. In addition to windmills, solar panels, and electric cars, there were solar and wind powered cell phone charging stations, touch-screen carbon footprint calculators, and ecocentric volunteers. Public transportation was maximized, and biking was encouraged through a bike valet."Eco Lands," devoted to environmental awareness, included a recycling spot that offered prizes in exchange for plastic bottles, a wind turbine, and a mini farmer's market. Ultimately over 75% of the festival's waste was composted and recycled.

With Radiohead and Tom Petty headlining, the first Outside Lands drew more than 130,000 people, and although well-reviewed, there were significant issues related to logistics. In 2011 Arcade Fire and Phish were headliners, and Outside Lands sold out for the first time. It has sold out every year since; in 2013, all three days sold out in under 24 hours.

Food and wine at Outside Lands was emphasized to reflect San Francisco's "obsession with food and drink." From its inaugural year, concessions included local restaurants, and areas devoted to chocolate, cheese, wine, and bacon. Gastromagic, a "culinary entertainment" stage, featured food related events. As with Bonnaroo, corporate sponsors at Outside Lands were integrated into the festival experience. Solar panels sponsored by a local energy company powered a cell phone charging booth, GIF photo booths were sponsored by Chromecast, and festival transportation was sponsored by Lyft.

In 2009, the company founded Superfly Marketing Group to further diversify their business model and capitalize on their expertise and curatorial voice. In addition to marketing their events almost exclusively through their own platforms, they had previously developed experiential marketing campaigns for brands including Life Is Good and Adult Swim and produced in-house gigs for Microsoft, Anheuser-Busch, and MTV, among others. Led by Goodstone, early SMG projects included JetBlue's Live From T5, a concert series at the airline's newly designed terminal which in 2010 featured a performance by Taylor Swift.

In 2012, Superfly launched The Great GoogaMooga, a festival promoted as "an amusement park of food, drink, and music." Held in Brooklyn's Prospect Park, GoogaMooga lasted two days during the summer of 2012 and three days during the summer 2013. It was criticized due to logistical issues in its inaugural year, and while Superfly corrected many of the problems in 2013, the festival was rained out on its third day. Disparaged by attendees and vendors as well as community groups who objected to the use of Prospect Park as a festival site, the Great GoogaMooga and cancelled after its second year.

=== 2013-Present: Live Nation, Cocktail Magic, Project Pabst, Clusterfest, Lost Lake, Grandoozy ===
In July 2014, Superfly launched the annual Project Pabst in Portland, Oregon. The festival, produced for Pabst, takes place on a 10-acre site at Zidell Yards in the South Waterfront District, Additional late-night shows are held at music venues in and around Portland. A portion of the proceeds from Project Pabst benefit the Jeremy Wilson Foundation, which provides financial assistance in times of medical crisis to musicians and their families. The 2015 Pabst Festival drew more than 15,000 attendees. In an interview with Billboard, Goodstone said that Project Pabst "sits at the nexus of everything we do."

In April 2015, Live Nation bought a controlling stake in Bonnaroo. Neither the price of the transaction, nor the size of Live Nation's stake in was disclosed. In a joint announcement by Live Nation, Superfly and AC Entertainment, the deal was described as a partnership that gave the founders a degree of autonomy.

In March 2016, Superfly launched Cocktail Magic, a cocktail event that took place in New York and Boston. The event featured 12 cocktail bars from each City as well as DJ performances, magicians and food. Cocktail Magic was led by Black, and curated by "mother of the modern craft cocktail" Julie Reiner and Andy Seymour, the co-founder of Liquid Production and a partner at Beverage Alcohol Resource (B.A.R.), a training course. Reiner and Seymour worked with each of the bars involved in Cocktail Magic to ensure diversity, with a goal of letting "each one bring their best in show with a couple of different options per establishment. "

Bonnaroo's 15th anniversary lineup was announced live on Conan. A press release noted that the infrastructure at Great State Park had been improved and amenities had added. The improvements included a permanent water line, allowing for the installation of more than 400 permanent toilets, hundreds of permanent shower stalls and a large number of water filling stations throughout the site. As of 2015, more than 1,600 artists and 150 comedians perform at Bonnaroo.

In March 2017, Superfly announced the Lost Lake Festival. A three-day event in Phoenix, AZ, the first Lost Lake Festival took place on October 20–22, 2017. The Colossal Clusterfest, a San Francisco comedy festival produced in partnership with Comedy Central, debuted in June 2017. In March 2018, Superfly announced that Grandoozy, a multi-day music festival in Denver, Colorado, would take place in September 2018.

In 2019, Live Nation bought out the rest of Bonnaroo, essentially ending Superfly's role in the festival.

Jonathan Mayers died in June 2025 at the age of 51.

== Corporate social responsibility ==
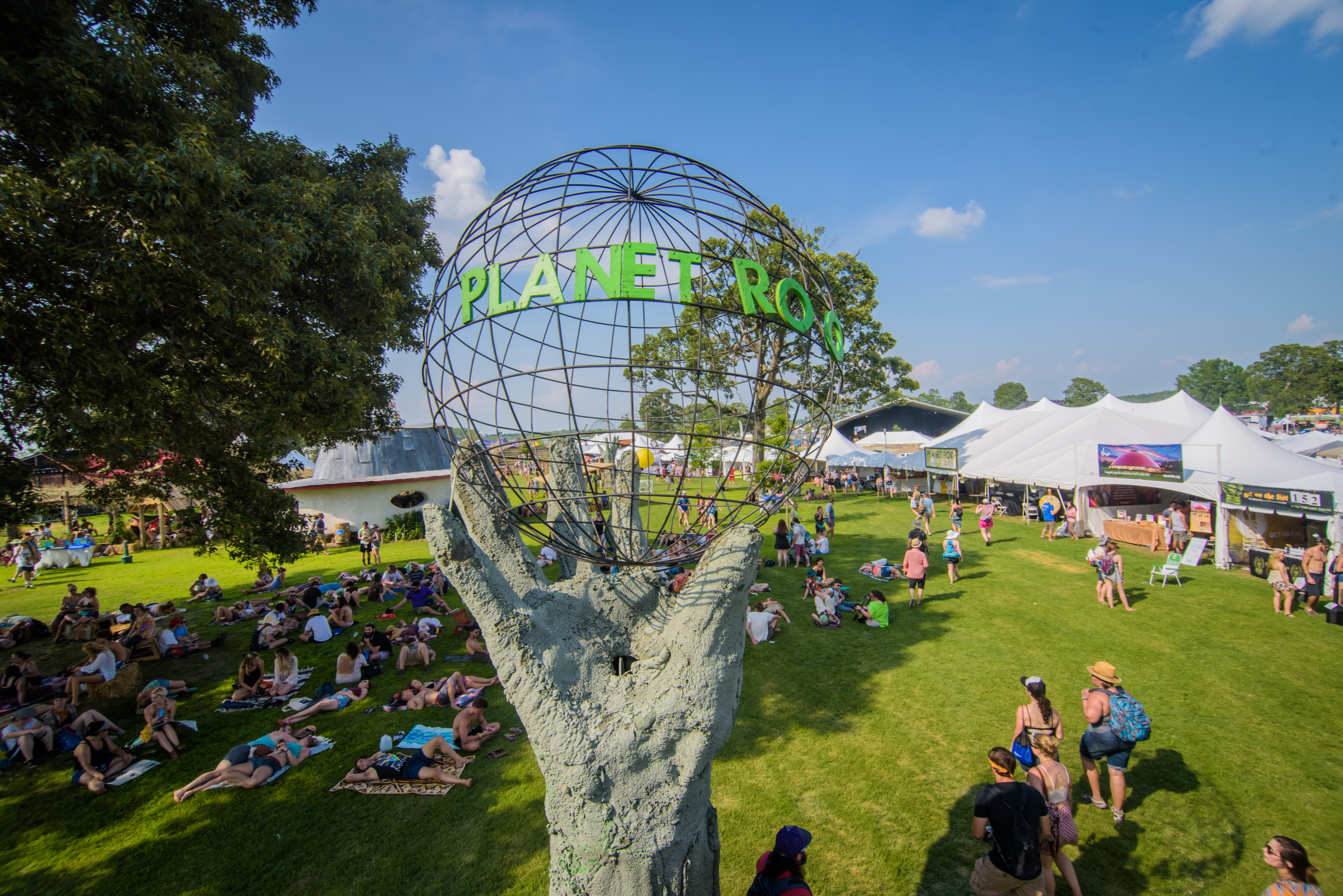

Both Bonnaroo and Outside Lands are noted for sustainability programs. In 2013, Bonnaroo became the first major North American music festival to utilize solar arrays. Since then, the festival has expanded its solar efforts with the use of solar energy across the Farm used to power cell phone charging stations and stages, offsetting more than 20% of energy usage. In 2016, Outside Lands diverted 91% of all waste from the landfill through a partnership with Clean Vibes 2016.

The Bonnaroo Food Recovery Program donates food to families in need. In 2015, over 29,000 pounds of food was collected. Food from the festival has been donated to organizations including Meadow Wood Senior Home, Ridge Crest Mental Health Home, Grundy County Jail, and summer programs for children.

The Bonnaroo Works Fund, a 501(c)(3) nonprofit organization, was founded in 2009 as the charitable division of Bonnaroo Music & Arts Festival. Its mission is to support national and regional non-profit organizations that advance the arts, education and environmental sustainability. With a primary focus on local reinvestment and asset-building, Bonnaroo Works Fund has donated over $7 million to charitable causes since the festival's inception. Outside Lands follows a similar model with the Outside Lands Works Fund. Outside Lands diverted 91% of all waste from the landfill through a partnership with Clean Vibes in 2016.

In 2011, Emily Dunn, a 23-year old employee of Superfly's San Francisco office, was struck by a Municipal bus and killed. She had worked in the music industry since she was 20. In 2012, members of the Superfly team established Well Dunn, an organization which supports students pursuing careers in the entertainment industry by providing financial grants which allow them to enhance their education through internships.

== Books, CDs, DVDs ==
- Live from Bonnaroo CD and DVD series, various artists (annual release, 2002–2015)
- Bonnaroo: What, Which, This, That, The Other, by Holly George-Warren; Harry N. Abrams ISBN 978-1419702563 (April 2012)
- Thank You. Good Night CD, Live tracks from Bonnaroo and Vegoose by Jack Johnson, G. Love, Matt Costa, Money Mark, Junketboy, November 2007
