= Another Planet Entertainment =

American entertainment company

- Company type: Private
- Industry: Entertainment
- Founded: 2003; 23 years ago
- Headquarters: Berkeley, California, U.S.
- Services: Concert production; concert promotion; artist management
- Website: apeconcerts.com

Another Planet Entertainment is an independent concert production and artist management company based in Berkeley, California. Founded in 2003 by former Bill Graham Presents executives Greg Perloff, Sherry Wasserman, and Steve Welkom, the company is noted for "changing the landscape of live music in San Francisco and its neighboring hubs, while staying faithful to the area’s musical roots and following in the footsteps of industry icon Bill Graham."

In addition to promoting and producing concerts and events at historically significant Bay Area venues including the Greek Theater in Berkeley, the Fox Oakland Theatre in Oakland, California and the Castro Theatre in San Francisco. Another Planet Entertainment co-founded and co-produces the Outside Lands festival. The company also produces San Francisco's Breakaway Festival and co-produces the Life is Beautiful festival in Las Vegas. In August 2024 Another Planet produced the first stand-alone after dark concert in Golden Gate Park on the West Side of San Francisco.
