= Pabst =

Pabst is a German surname. Notable people with the surname include:

- Adolf Pabst (1899–1990), American mineralogist and geologist
- Daniel Pabst (1826–1910), American furniture maker
- Frederick Pabst (1836–1904), American brewer
- Georg Wilhelm Pabst (1885–1967), Austrian film director
- Guido Frederico João Pabst (1914-1980), Brazilian botanist
- Hermann Pabst (1842–1870), German historian
- Johann Heinrich Pabst (1785–1838), German-Austrian physician, philosopher and lay theologian
- Pavel Pabst (1854–1897), Prussian pianist and composer
- Paul Pabst, executive producer of The Dan Patrick Show, where he is a member of the "Danettes".
- Theo Pabst (1905–1979), German architect
- Thomas Pabst (born 1966), founder of Tom's Hardware, a computer hardware publication
- Waldemar Pabst (1880–1970), German soldier and right-wing political activist

== See also ==
- Pabst Brewing Company, brewing company once owned by Frederick Pabst
  - Pabst Blue Ribbon, a beer brand
  - Pabst Brewery Complex, a facility in Milwaukee, Wisconsin, that was closed in 1997
- Pabst Mansion, the Milwaukee home to Captain Frederick Pabst
- Pabst Theater, a theatrical venue in Milwaukee, Wisconsin named after the Pabst family
- Pabst Hotel, a short-lived New York City hotel sponsored by the brewing company
- Pabst Plan, a Nazi plan to reconstruct Warsaw after its near-total destruction in 1944
- Papst (disambiguation)
