= T4F – Time For Fun =

Brazilian live entertainment company

T4F Entretenimento S.A.
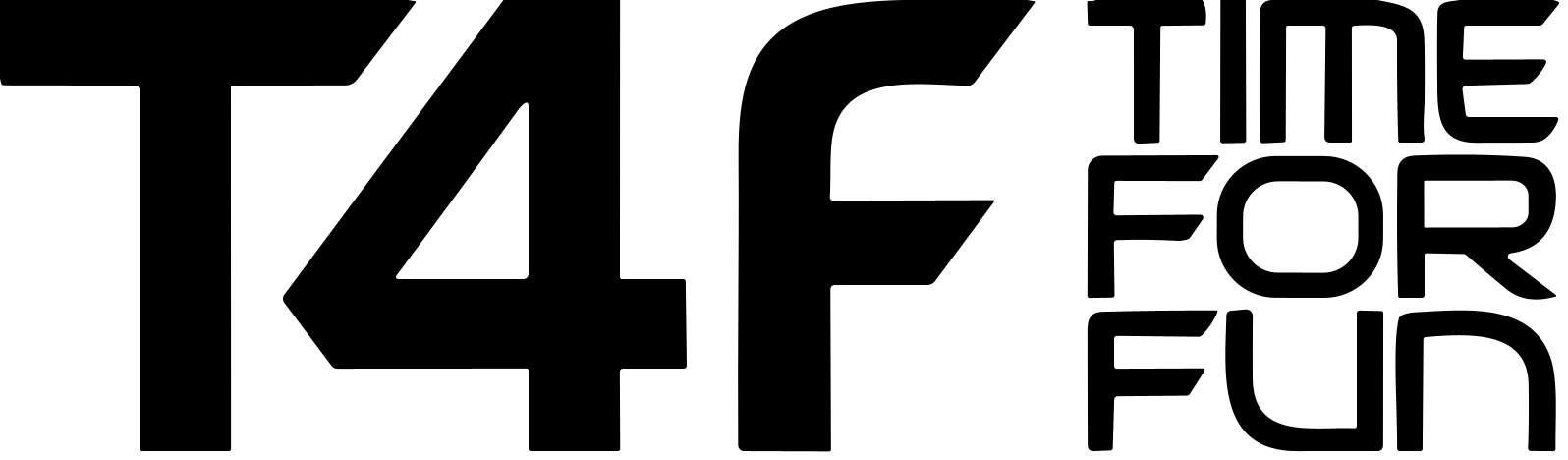
- Company type: Sociedade Anônima
- Traded as: B3: SHOW3
- Industry: Entertainment
- Founded: 1983
- Headquarters: São Paulo, Brazil
- Key people: Fernando Luiz Alterio, (Chairman & CEO)
- Products: Concerts, Spectacle, Theatre
- Revenue: ▼US$ 202.4 million (2017)
- Net income: ▲US$ 14.0 million (2017)
- Number of employees: 1,679
- Website: www.t4f.com.br

T4F – Time For Fun is a Brazilian entertainment company, being the third largest live entertainment company in Latin America and one of the largest in the world according to Billboard. T4F also won the Top International Promoter 2009 done by the Billboard Touring Awards. The company operates in the concerts, theaters, art events, family and football sector in Brazil, Argentina and Chile.

Currently T4F operates five of the most important entertainment venues in South America, of which four are ranked among the top 50 venues worldwide in terms of number of tickets sold in 2010, according to Pollstar.

The venues of T4F are Credicard Hall, Teatro Abril, located in São Paulo, Citibank Hall in Rio de Janeiro and Ópera Allianz in Buenos Aires. With the exception of Ópera Allianz hall, which T4F owns, all the venues are leased from third parties.

T4F has been the subject of controversy due to their mismanagement of the Brazilian leg of the Eras Tour by Taylor Swift, including failing to prevent scalpers from cutting in the lines for concert tickets, and for the death of Ana Clara Benevides, a concertgoer, by banning water bottles in venue during a heat wave. The company has been widely reported to the Brazilian authorities by customers and politicians such as congresswoman Erika Hilton.
