= Outside Lands (festival) =

Annual festival in San Francisco, California

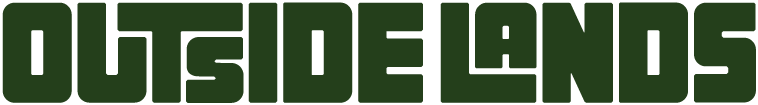
- Status: Active
- Genre: Rock; pop, indie, hip hop, dance; jam; soul; funk
- Frequency: Annual
- Venue: Golden Gate Park
- Locations: San Francisco, California
- Coordinates: 37°46′11″N 122°28′37″W
- Country: US
- Years active: 2008–2019; 2021–present 2020 (Inside Lands)
- Inaugurated: August 22, 2008
- Founders: Superfly; Another Planet Entertainment; Starr Hill Presents
- Most recent: August 8–10, 2025
- Attendance: 225,000
- Capacity: 225,000
- Website: www.sfoutsidelands.com

Outside Lands, formerly known as the Outside Lands Music and Arts Festival, is a three-day music, art, food, wine, beer and cannabis festival held annually in San Francisco's Golden Gate Park. Multi-genre and multi-generational, it is the largest independently owned music festival in the United States. It was founded in 2008 by Superfly, Another Planet Entertainment, and Starr Hill Presents, a Charlottesville, Virginia concert promoter.

A "love letter to San Francisco," the festival is named for the city's western neighborhoods, which were known as The Outside Lands in the 1800s. The 80-acre festival grounds feature art installations and exhibits by local artists and San Francisco-centric areas devoted to cannabis, activism and sustainability. With stages named after San Francisco locations including the Panhandle, Lands End, Twin Peaks, the Sutro and the Presidio, the San Francisco Weekly wrote that Outside Lands "was about the city, rather than just in it."

A reflection of San Francisco's culinary culture, food is a central focus of Outside Lands. 100% of the vendors are local, ranging from Michelin-starred restaurants to one-off pop ups and food trucks. In 2023, Outside Lands featured 96 Bay Area restaurants in addition to 35 wineries and 30 breweries. The San Francisco Chronicle wrote that the food and drink at the festival could "rival any gastronomically-focused event in the country".

Outside Lands provides financial grants to regional music and arts education program through its charitable fund, Outside Lands Works. The festival has injected more than $1 billion into the local economy since it was founded. In addition to other awards and recognition, Outside Lands was named Top Festival at the Billboard Music Awards. Its founders received the environmental service award from the San Francisco Department of the Environment.

== History ==
Outside Lands began with a 2004 conversation between Allen Scott of Another Planet Entertainment, a Berkeley-based promoter, and Rick Farman, a founder of Superfly, the creators and producers of Bonnaroo. Another Planet and Superfly partnered with Starr Hill Presents to develop and produce Outside Lands.

The first nighttime ticketed event at Golden Gate Park, Outside Lands required approval and cooperation from governmental agencies including San Francisco Recreation and Parks and the SFMTA in addition to several neighborhood associations and community groups.

To respond to neighborhood concerns, Another Planet and Superfly set up a multi-lingual community hotline, and in partnership with the city, developed a transportation system that included shuttles and dedicated bus lines. Several additional measures related to security, and reducing waste were also implemented. It took more than three years to secure the necessary permits for the inaugural Outside Lands, which took place August 22–24, 2008. In advance of the festival, 28,000 nearby residents were notified regarding its hours as well as relevant road closures. A multi-lingual community hotline was established, and Outside Lands information was run in three newspapers and on English, Russian, Chinese and Spanish websites. To keep from damaging root systems, an arborist determined where stages could be built. Bike lanes were reconfigured to allow the park's feral cat population to enter and exit.

=== 2008–2012: Radiohead, Wine Lands, Taste of the Bay Area ===
Sixty artists performed during the first Outside Lands. It was headlined by Radiohead, who became the first band to play after dark in Golden Gate Park. A multi-generational, multi-genre "panorama of alternative rock, indie pop, jam bands, conscious rap, progressive Latin and world-beat fusion," the festival sold out, with 130,000 attendees over the course of its three days. Although there were sound dropouts during Radiohead's set and issues related to gatecrashers and crowd control, the festival was mainly a success.

In 2009, the city permits were delayed and the festival lineup was not confirmed until April. The Beastie Boys, who were scheduled to headline on Sunday night, were forced to cancel two weeks out; just diagnosed with cancer, Adam Yauch was recovering from radiation treatments. The Beasties were replaced by Tenacious D.

Livestreamed on YouTube, the main stage artists in 2009 included Pearl Jam, the Black Eyed Peas, and the Dave Matthews Band. A performance by Tom Jones—a superstar in the 1960s—was a highlight; Jones drew a large and enthusiastic audience, establishing what would become a tradition of legacy artists at Outside Lands. The headliners proved to be less of a draw than those that performed in 2008, and in 2009 attendance dropped to 90,000.

In 2010, to keep Outside Lands alive during the recession, the festival was shortened from three days to two and ticket prices were reduced. 'Food and Wine' was added to the festival's 'Music and Arts' tagline as its culinary emphasis became more prominent. 30 "rock star food and wine vendors" were announced in May, generating significant media attention. With 99% of the vendors local, the food at Outside Lands was collectively referred to as "Taste of the Bay Area."

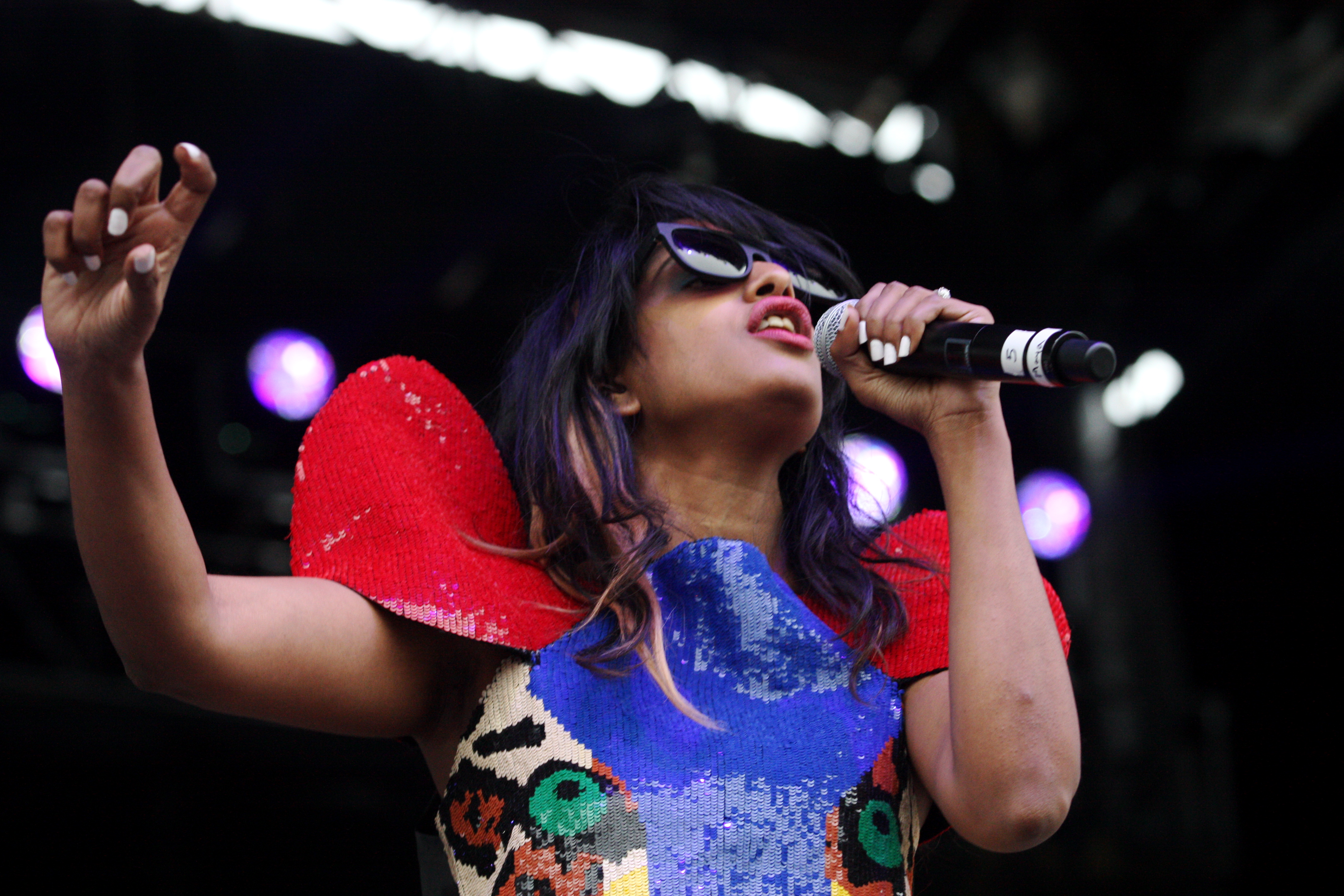
M.I.A. at Outside Lands in 2009

40 artists performed at Outside Lands in 2010, including Sierra Leone's Refugee All Stars, My Morning Jacket, The Strokes, and Bob Weir and Phil Lesh's band, Furthur. The lineup was commended for its eclecticism but criticized because overlapping sets, as well as the time it took to traverse the festival grounds, made it impossible for attendees to see full performances on the primary stages. LAist praised the festival's organization, crowd control, and planning based on its amenities, as well as the transportation options such as city-wide shuttle services and free valet bike parking.

In 2011, Outside Lands returned to a three-day schedule with headliners including Arcade Fire, Muse, and Phish, who closed the Friday night show with a two-set, three-and-a-half hour performance. Wine Lands, which became one of the most popular features of the festival, debuted with 30 regional vineyards. An organic farmer's market, a sports bar, and a food truck forest were also introduced, and a wooded area that shortened the time required to travel between stages, McLaren Pass, was opened. Another sell-out, Outside Lands grossed $12.9m in 2011.

Headlined by Neil Young and Crazy Horse, Stevie Wonder, and Metallica—"easily the loudest band to ever hit the main stage"—Outside Lands sold out again in 2012. The culinary experience was expanded to include Beer Lands, Choco Lands, Farm Lands, and Outside Lambs, as well as "Taste of The Bay Area", which featured 65 on-site restaurants. Wine Lands and Beer Lands housed 49 wineries and 19 breweries. Sixty artists performed, including Jack White, who did a surprise pop-up show in McLaren Pass with the Peacocks, his all-female band.

During its first five years, Outside Lands generated $8.3 million in revenue for Golden Gate Park. In 2011 alone, its economic impact in San Francisco exceeded $60 million.

=== 2013–2017: Paul McCartney, Gastro Magic, 10th anniversary ===
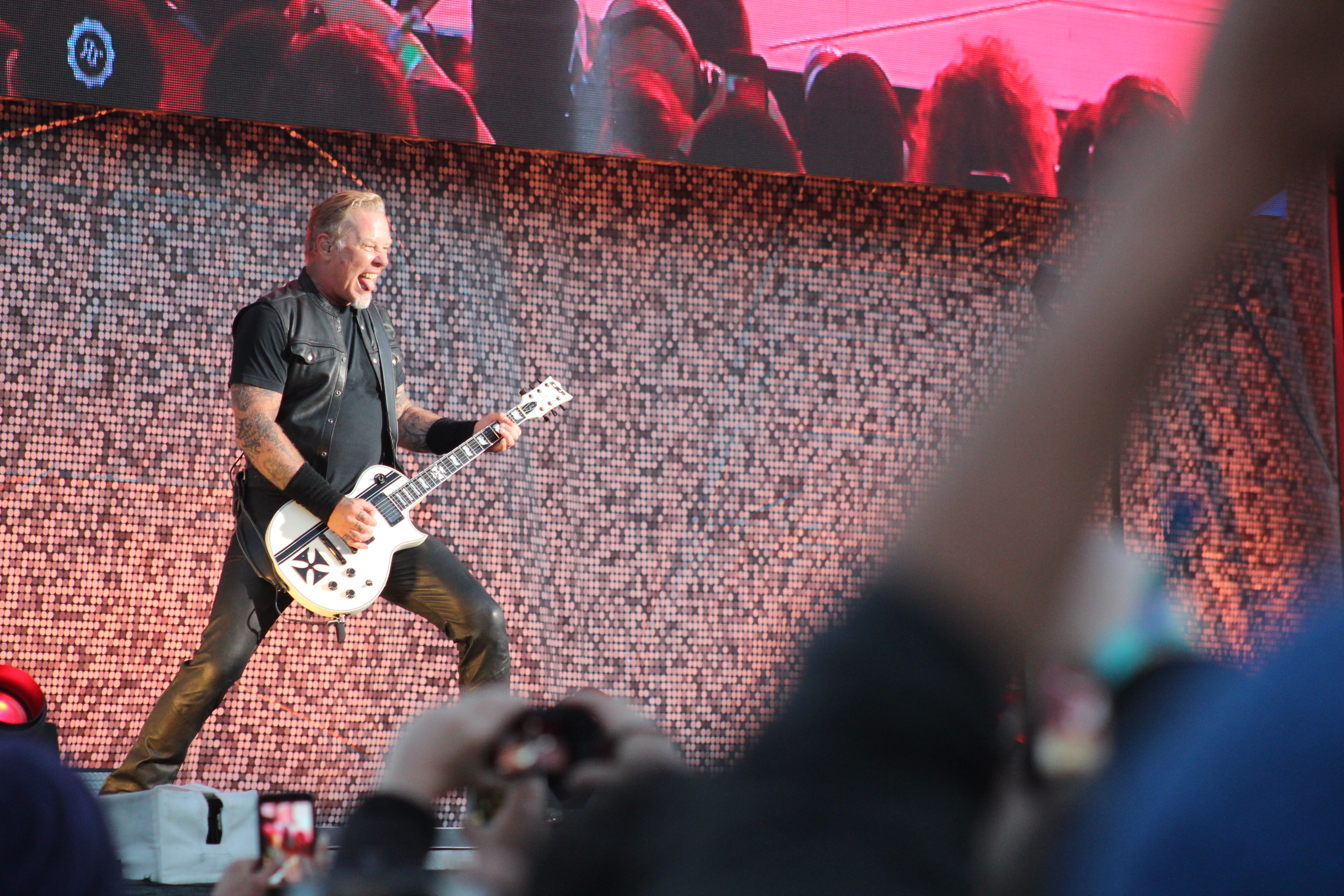
James Hetfield of Metallica on stage at Outside Lands in 2017

Sold out for the fourth consecutive year, Paul McCartney headlined Outside Lands in 2013. His two-hour soundcheck at Golden Gate the day before the festival gates opened could be heard throughout the adjacent area. McCartney played for nearly three hours on Friday night; his set included fireworks (during "Live and Let Die" ) and a performance of "Yesterday" with the Kronos Quartet. Nine Inch Nails and the Red Hot Chili Peppers also headlined in 2013.

In 2014, Outside Lands sold out in 24 hours. More than 100 artists, including Tom Petty, The Killers, Willie Nelson and Kanye West, played on seven stages. West performed in complete darkness. The same year, new walking paths were created, and a solar-powered stage as well as a recycling center were unveiled. Gastro Magic, a series of live shows that brought high-profile chefs together with comics and musicians, debuted on a dedicated stage in McLaren Pass.

Hundreds of forged Outside Lands tickets were seized by the San Francisco police in 2014. They had been sold outside the festival grounds for as much as $1000. In 2015, the security at the park perimeter was increased, and radio-frequency identification wristbands replaced paper tickets.

Outside Lands featured Elton John, The Black Keys, and Kendrick Lamar in 2015. The lineup was announced in a Funny or Die video by San Francisco 49er Aldon Smith. Comics including members of The Daily Show news team, Tig Notaro, and the Upright Citizens Brigade' performed on the Barbary Stage. The small stages built for newer artists were expanded across the festival grounds. In 2016, with only the partial lineup announced, weekend passes for the festival sold out in 45 minutes. The reformed LCD Soundsystem performed on Friday night, and Radiohead returned to headline on Saturday. In addition to Lana Del Rey, Lionel Richie, and Anderson .Paak, The Muppets house band, Dr. Teeth and the Electric Mayhem, played live for the first time ever. Their five-song set included "With a Little Help from My Friends" (with the Oakland Interfaith Gospel Choir) and a cover of The Mowgli's "San Francisco."

Outside Lands marked its tenth anniversary in 2017 with Metallica, The Who, Gorillaz, Solange and Lorde. Queens of the Stone Age cancelled and were replaced by Cage the Elephant. The seventh consecutive sell-out, 78 restaurants, 40 wineries, and 28 breweries were on site. Roy Choi took over an area overlooking the main stage for "Feast in the Trees," a four-course pop up dinner on Friday night.

=== 2018–present: Grass Lands, Inside Lands, 15th anniversary ===
210,000 tickets were sold for Outside Lands in 2018, which featured Janet Jackson, The Weeknd, Florence and the Machine, and Janelle Monáe. A review in the East Bay Express noted that the 2019 lineup was "its most diverse and inclusive ever" and that the "best performances of the weekend were not from the white male-fronted rock bands of yore but from women, people of color, and queer artists." New attractions included the Alice in Wonderland-themed Bubble Tea Party and a talk series called D.A.V.E: Discussions about Virtually Everything. Grass Lands, a curated cannabis experience, was also introduced. As smoking was prohibited in Golden Gate Park, no cannabis was sold.

The San Francisco Board of Supervisors unanimously voted to support Outside Lands' application to renew its 10-year permit in 2019. That year, the festival was headlined by Twenty One Pilots, Childish Gambino and Paul Simon. Bob Weir joined Simon on stage; although they had been friends for 52 years, it was the first time they performed together publicly. A record audience of 90,000 people turned up for Childish Gambino's set. As cannabis policies in California loosened, Outside Lands "made history", becoming the first major U.S. music festival to sell marijuana on festival grounds. Golden Gate Park allowed smoking in limited areas during the festival. The Grass Lands area was restricted to people 21 and older.

In 2020, due to the pandemic, Outside Lands was cancelled. Inside Lands, a virtual version of the festival featuring performance videos from the previous 12 years, was streamed on Twitch.

In 2021, Outside Lands was postponed until Halloween weekend. Attendees were required to either show proof of COVID-19 vaccination or proof of a negative COVID-19 test result conducted within 72 hours of entering the festival grounds. SOMA, a tent with continuous DJ sets, premiered in 2021; only fully vaccinated people were allowed inside the tent, and masks were required. In addition to Lizzo, Vampire Weekend, and the Strokes, J Balvin performed, becoming the first Latinx headliner at Outside Lands. "Taste of the Bay Area" featured 85 restaurants and more than 100 wines were offered at Wine Lands.

Outside Lands was held on August 5–7, 2022. A "festival within a festival," artists including Green Day, Post Malone, SZA, Phoebe Bridgers, Weezer, Jack Harlow and Kim Petras performed. The first tickets released sold out in 30 minutes.

The fifteenth anniversary edition of Outside Lands took place on August 11–13 with performers including Kendrick Lamar, the Foo Fighters, ODESZA, Lana Del Rey, The 1975, Megan Thee Stallion, Zedd, Janelle Monáe, Maggie Rogers, and Fisher. 96 restaurants, food trucks, and pop ups, served over 700 menu items and 65 wineries and breweries were featured. As of its fifteenth anniversary, Outside Lands had injected more than $1bn into the local economy.

In May 13, 2023, two or three additional days of concerts at Golden Gate Park to take place over the weekend following Outside Lands were proposed by San Francisco Mayor London Breed. "Headliner-driven" events, promoted and produced by Another Planet. The proposed concerts would utilize existing Outside Lands infrastructure to minimize impact on the park. The events would begin in 2024.

== Culinary experiences ==
=== The Lands, Taste of the Bay Area ===
A "world-class food festival," in addition to Wine Lands and Beer Lands, the Lands at Outside Lands have included Bacon Lands, Cheese Lands, Choco Lands, Clam Lands and Farm Lands. Outside Lands has also hosted culinary one-offs, such as Michael Mina's Outside Lambs in 2012.

=== Cocktail Magic and GastroMagic ===
The GastroMagic stage was introduced in 2014. It featured cooking demonstrations and collaborations between high-profile chefs and musicians, comics, and other personalities. In its inaugural year, acclaimed chefs read bad Yelp reviews on the GastroMagic stage.

Following its 2014 debut, Big Freedia's Bounce and Beignet Brunch with chef Brenda Buenviaje—a "twerk for your supper situation"—became an annual tradition. Part of its success was based on audience participation; in 2015, more interactive performances took place on the GastroMagic stage. They included the fast-food-themed tribute act Mac Sabbath, who threw french fries and boxes of chicken nuggets into the crowd.

Cocktail Magic debuted at Outside Lands in 2016. Known for its "whimsical theme and boozy concoctions", it housed specially-themed cocktail bars, such as "Shaken, Not Stirred" (a martini bar); "Everybody's Tavern" (inspired by San Francisco's inclusive culture); and "Buttery Tipple" (a '70s lounge experience). Magicians, illusionists, and musicians performed on the Cocktail Magic stage.

In 2017, Roy Choi prepared kalbi, kimchi and short ribs. He also made a birthday cake for Del the Funky Homosapien, who joined him on stage. Susan Feniger cooked with Adam Duritz, and Action Bronson "spit bars" and talked about his cookbook, An Annotated Guide To Eating Well. In 2018, Bill Nye did "something having to do with science" with chef Matty Matheson, Shangela (of RuPaul's Drag Race) joined chef Tiffani Faison for "Fish and Tea" and Naomi Pomeroy collaborated with Portugal. The Man. Katey Red stood in for Big Freedia at the Bounce and Beignet Brunch.

In 2019, the GastroMagic stage hosted a Bon Appétit test kitchen, emceed by editor-in-chief Andy Rappaport, Molly Baz and Andy Baraghani cooked with Cupcakke and Ella Mai. Anderson .Paak hit the GastroMagic stage, and Boyfriend's rap cabaret became a "snack cabaret" with Chris Cosentino. (Cosentino was also featured during 2020's Inside Lands, the virtual Outside Lands that streamed on Twitch during the pandemic.)

Among others, in 2021, GastroMagic brought Elizabeth Falkner together with The Strokes' Albert Hammond Jr. to make cream puff and James Beard Award-winning chef Kwame Onwuachi cooked for Chali 2na of Jurassic 5. GastroMagic's highlights in 2022 included Nyesha Arrington and Kali Uchis making red pepper arepas and Salt Tank preparing chicken parmesan sandwiches for Philip Rosenthal and his daughter Lily.

In 2023, Cocktail Magic was expanded from three to eight stages. In addition to cocktails and food pairings, non-alcoholic beverages were offered. Although GastroMagic was scrapped, several of its features were incorporated into Cocktail Magic programming, including Bounce and Beignet. DJs Invisibl Skratch Pikl, with guests Cut Chemist, Dan the Automator, Del the Funky Homosapien and Cellski, performed on the Cocktail Magic stage.

== Other Lands and experiences ==
=== Grass Lands ===
Grass Lands was launched in 2018. That year, it was mainly an educational platform and a showcase for cannabis brands. Smoking was illegal in Golden Gate Park, and California regulations prohibited smoking cannabis in locations where tobacco was not allowed.

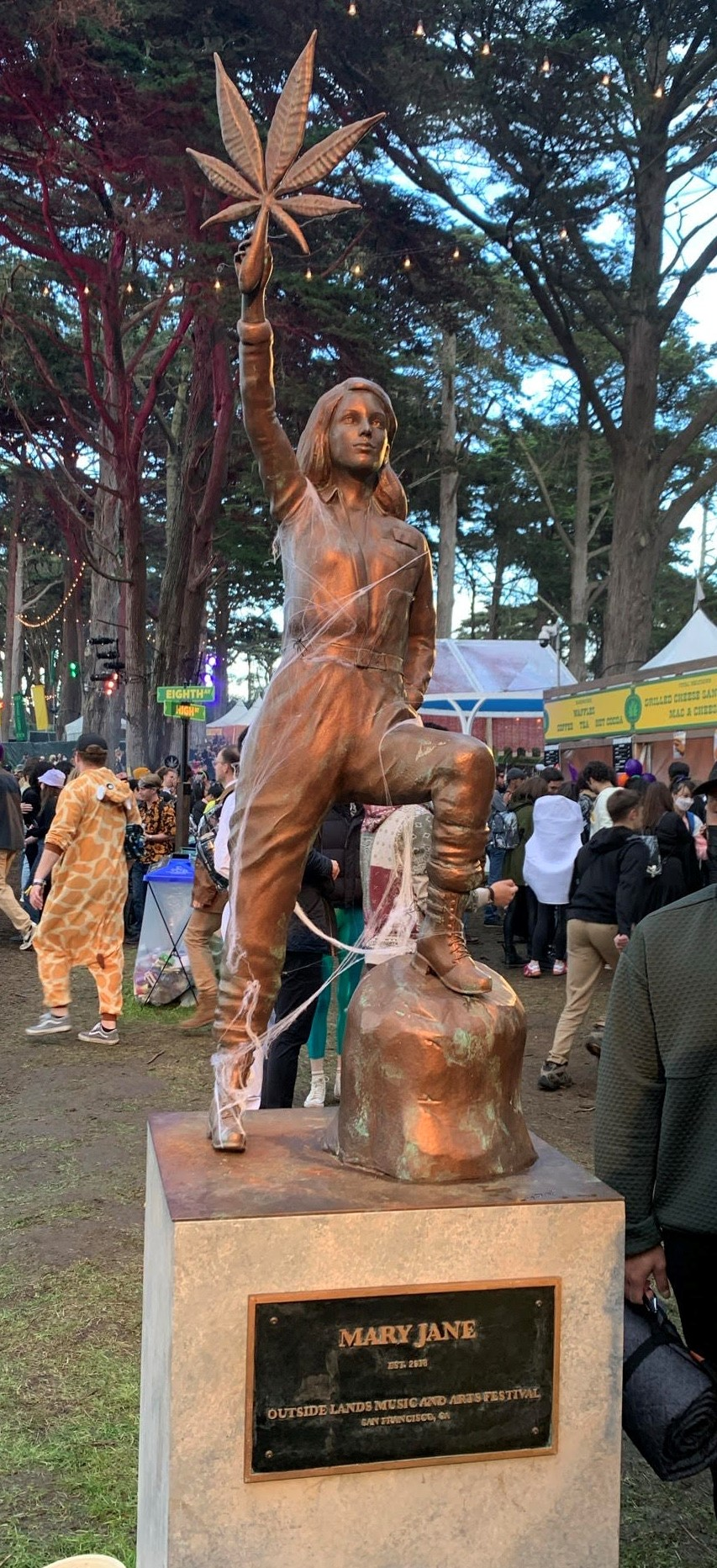

In 2019, 36 hours before the gates opened, the San Francisco Office of Cannabis issue a temporary sales permit that allowed cannabis products to be sold and consumed within the Grass Lands area, which was restricted to people 21 and older. More than $1 million in cannabis products including edibles, vaping cartridges and joints were sold by 28 companies, including the Francisco-based brands Green Door, Lady Chatterley Delivery, Flower to the People and Posh Green Collective. In addition to cannabis products, Bloom offered an oxygen bar, and Flow Kana's Farm to Bong provided produce such as eggplant that could be used to create smoking devices. THC-free food such as Johnny's Donuts were sold. Cannabis Voter and United Playaz—a gun buy-back organization—had booths within Grass Lands.

In 2021, Grass Lands added a stage for performances and DJ sets and demos and discussions with cannabis industry leaders. "A stoner's paradise," in 2022, a communal mural was painted by attendees; Stiiizy sponsored a snack-stocked bodega, and local restaurants set up booths to sell foods such as grilled cheese. High Times sponsored a farmer's market—a dispensary—and Zig-Zag hosted a joint-rolling bar. Local LGBTQ+ brands and small farms were again featured. and Headcount's Cannabis Voter Project was onsite to register voters before the 2022 elections.

In 2023, Grass Lands featured 20 cannabis vendors and 35 brands. The menu was curated by socially equitable cannabis brands in partnership with the Equity Trade Network and Martin Olive of the dispensary Vapor Room. Comedy, cooking demonstrations and DJ sets took place on the Grass Lands stage, and the green consumption footprint was expanded. Food vendors included the "cheese-forward" Total Meltdown.

=== Eco Lands ===
A mainstay of Outside Lands since the festival was founded, Eco Lands hosts national and local non-profit organizations that offer educational opportunities related to environmental sustainability. Eco Land's features have included a solar-powered stage, solar-powered cell charging stations, furniture reclaimed from landfills, and tools that allow people to check their carbon footprint.

== Sustainability and economic impact ==
Outside Lands pays permit fees of $2.3 million annually to San Francisco Recreation and Parks. It has injected more than $1bn into the local economy since it was founded.

Since its inception, Outside Lands has worked with Clean Vibes, a company that provides waste management, recycling, and cleanup services for outdoor festivals and events. In exchange for tickets to the festival, Clean Vibes volunteers divert waste from landfills through recycling and composting. In 2022, more than 90% of the festival's waste was diverted.

To mitigate noise, traffic, and the environmental impact of cars, on-site bike valets and shuttle services that operate throughout the Bay Area, In addition, Outside Lands implemented environmental and sustainability initiatives including:

- Comprehensive water program; attendees can refill water bottles at four free water sites
- Reusable aluminum cups to be used for refills at Beer Lands and reusable and recyclable cups at Wine Lands
- All single use plates and utensils are 100% compostable
- Textile recycling program in partnership with the San Francisco Department of the Environment's Textile Reuse and Recycling Initiative
- Recycling, compost and zero waste bins in all areas of the festival site

== Festival summary by year ==
Year	Dates	Headliners	Total attendance	Notes
2008	August; 22–24	Radiohead; Tom Petty and the Heartbreakers; Jack Johnson	130,000	Sold out
2009	August; 28–30	Dave Matthews Band; Pearl Jam; Tenacious D	90,000	Tenacious D replaced the Beastie Boys
2010	August; 14–15	Kings of Leon; The Strokes; Furthur	80,000	Friday and Saturday only
2011	August; 12–14	Muse; Phish; Arcade Fire	180,000	Sold out
2012	August; 10–12	Neil Young; Metallica; Stevie Wonder	200,000	Attendance capacity increased Sold out
2013	August; 9–11	Paul McCartney; Red Hot Chili Peppers; Nine Inch Nails	200,000	Sold out
2014	August; 8–10	Kanye West; Tom Petty and the Heartbreakers; The Killers	200,000	Sold out
2015	August; 7–9	Elton John; Mumford & Sons; The Black Keys	210,000	Attendance capacity increased Sold out
2016	August; 5–7	Radiohead; LCD Soundsystem; Lionel Richie	210,000	Sold out
2017	August; 11–13	Metallica; The Who; Gorillaz	210,000	10th Anniversary; Sold out
2018	August; 10–12	The Weeknd; Florence and the Machine; Janet Jackson	210,000	Grass Lands debut Sold out
2019	August; 9–11	Paul Simon; Childish Gambino; Twenty One Pilots	210,000	Sold out
2020	August; 28–29	Inside Lands	Virtual; streamed on Twitch	Live event cancelled due to pandemic
2021	October; 29–31	Tame Impala; Lizzo; The Strokes	222,954	Moved from Aug 6–8; Sold out Total gross: $33,200,956
2022	August; 5–7	Green Day; Post Malone; SZA	222,518	Sold out Total gross: $33,902,932
2023	August; 11–13	Kendrick Lamar; Foo Fighters; Odesza	225,000	Sold out Total gross: $40.1M
2024	August; 9–11	The Killers; Sabrina Carpenter; Sturgill Simpson	184,000	Total gross: $29.5M
2025	August; 8–11	Doja Cat; Tyler the Creator; Hozier	209,000	Total gross: $41.4M
2026	August; 7-9	Charli XCX; The Strokes; Rüfüs Du Sol	225,000	Sold out Total gross: $50.1M
