= Xakriabá language =

Extinct Macro-Je language of Brazil

Xakriabá
- Krẽká
- Native to: Brazil
- Region: Minas Gerais
- Ethnicity: Xakriabá people
- Language family: Macro-Jê: Jê; Cerrado; Akuwẽ (Central Jê); Xakriabá

Language codes
- ISO 639-3: xkr
- Glottolog: xakr1238
- ELP: Xakriabá
- Xakriabá is classified as Extinct by the UNESCO Atlas of the World's Languages in Danger.

Xakriabá (also called Chakriaba, Chikriaba, Shacriaba or Shicriabá) is a dormant Akuwẽ (Central Jê) language (Jê, Macro-Jê) formerly spoken in Minas Gerais, Brazil by the Xakriabá people, who today speak Portuguese. The language is known through two short wordlists collected by Augustin Saint-Hilaire and Wilhelm Ludwig von Eschwege.

== History ==
Before 1712, Xakriabá was originally spoken along the São Francisco River near São Romão, Minas Gerais (Saint-Hilaire 2000: 340–341). The Xakriabá were then forced to migrate after being defeated by Matias Cardoso de Almeida and other Paulistas from 1690 onwards. In 1819, Saint-Hilaire (1975: 145) noted that the Xakriabá of Triângulo Mineiro region spoke a Xerente dialect. It was reported that Dejanira Xakriabá, who died in 2007, knew the original language of the Xakriabá. Presently, only a few elders remember some phrases in Xakriabá.

== Phonology ==
=== Vowels ===
	Front	Central	Back
Close	i ĩ	ɨ	u ũ
Mid	e ẽ	ə	o õ
Open-mid	ɛ		ɔ
Open		a ã	

- /i/ can also be heard as [ɪ] in shortened positions.

=== Consonants ===
		Labial	Alveolar	Palatal	Velar	Glottal
Stop	voiceless	p	t		k	
Stop	voiced	b	d			
Fricative	voiceless		s	(ʃ)		h
Fricative	voiced		z	(ʒ)		
Nasal		m	n			
Tap			ɾ			
Approximant		w		(j)		

- [j] is heard from /i/ before other vowels or within diphthongs.
- [ʃ ʒ] are heard as allophones of /s z/.
- [tʃ dʒ ɲ] are heard as allophones of /t d n/ when palatalized before /i/.
- [ɡ] can be heard as an allophone of /k/.
