= Panará people =

Indigenous people of Brazil

Panará
Total population
- 437 (2010)

Regions with significant populations
- Brazil (Mato Grosso)

Languages
- Panará, Portuguese

The Panará are an Indigenous people of Mato Grosso in the Brazilian Amazon. They farm and are hunter-gatherers.

== Name ==
They were formerly called the Kreen-Akrore. Other names for the Panará include Kreen Akarore, Kren Akarore, Krenhakarore, Krenhakore, Krenakore, Krenakarore or Krenacarore, and "Índios Gigantes" ("Giant Indians") – all variants of the Mẽbêngôkre name Krã jàkàràre [ˈkɾʌ̃ jʌˈkʌɾʌɾɛ], meaning "roundlike cuthead", a reference to their traditional hair style which identifies them.

== Language ==
The Panará speak the Panará language, which is classified as a Goyaz Jê language, belonging to the Jê language family (Macro-Jê). It is written in the Latin script.

== Origin ==
The Panará are the last descendants of the Southern Kayapó, a large ethnic group which inhabited a vast area in Central Brazil in the 18th century, from the northern borders of the state of São Paulo, Triângulo Mineiro and south of Goiás, stretching eastwards from Mato Grosso, eastern and southeastern portion of Mato Grosso do Sul. Latest researches indicate that Southern Kayapó and Panará are in fact one single language. Linguistically, the Panará (and the Southern Kayapó) are a Jê-speaking group of Central Brazil; their language is most closely related to the Northern Jê group, which encompasses Mẽbêngôkre, Kĩsêdjê, Tapayúna, Apinajé, and Timbira languages.

== Contact ==
In 1961, a British explorer by the name of Richard Mason was killed by the Panará people while exploring a previously unexplored region, which was assured to be free of indigenous individuals. In 1967, the Panará people approached a Brazilian airbase on the Cachimbo range. They were interested in the airplanes, believing them to be living creatures. The group, which was reported to be made up of women and children and non-hostile, was considered a war party by the military. The soldiers were ordered to fire over the heads of the “wild Indians” and soon a landing plane was used to successfully terrify the Panará into fleeing. In 1970, an expedition was formed to make contact with the Panará headed by the Villas-Bôas brothers.

Government workers at the indigenous reserve, Xingu National Park were interested in learning more upon hearing of the capture of one of the Panará tribes children by a rival tribe, as well as their hopes that contact with Panará would prevent conflict when they learned that the (Cuiabá-Santarém) road BR-163 planned to cut straight through their territory. The leaders of the expedition gathered members of other tribes who had once been isolated but who now lived on in Parque do Xingu and set out on to make contact. Despite many months of leaving intended gifts for the Panará at one of their banana and maize plantations the expedition was unable to make any real contact with them other than a few visual encounters as well as few gifts which the Panará left them in return. After the expedition was over, the Panará lived in relative isolation until three years later in 1973 when the government project (Cuiabá-Santarém) road BR-163 was built through their territory. As a result, the tribe was decimated by newly introduced diseases and suffered from the environmental degradation of their land. Of the more than 350 members of the Panará tribe, more than 250 perished in the first twelve months after their first contact with outsiders.

== Life in Xingu ==
On 12 January 1975, the 79 surviving members of the tribe were transferred by the government to the indigenous reserve Xingu National Park, and forced to live in proximity with former enemies, under state supervision. A working team from the Escola Paulista de Medicina examined 27 of the 29 newcomers, adults over 20 years old. The average height was 1.67m (~5’6”), which corresponded to the average height of those from the Jê group, a little taller than those from Alto Xingu.

Twenty years later the Panará began negotiations to move home to their original territory. However, much of their old land had been degraded by prospectors, gold panning, settlement or cattle breeding (six out of eight of their old villages had been destroyed), but one large stretch of unspoiled dense forest could still be identified. In 1994, the tribe elders met with Xingu Park leaders and FUNAI to demand the right to move back to their original territory, and were eventually allowed 4,950 square kilometres from their ancient traditional territory along the Iriri River located on the border of Mato Grosso and Pará states.

Between 1995 and 1996, the Panará gradually moved to a new village called Nãsẽpotiti in their traditional land, and on 1 November 1996 the Justice Minister declared the Panará Indigenous Land a "permanent indigenous possession". By 2004 the number of Panará was around 250, and in 2008 they were 374. In 2010 there were 437 Panará.

They have expanded to four villages in the Panara indigenous land, (2012) some have moved up river to build the village of Sõnkwêê. In (2014) Sõkârãsâ was nearing its final stage of completion. (2016) Kôtikô was built on the Ipiranga river in the opposite corner of their indigenous land. The population of the Panará people is estimated to be around 500-600 as of 2018.

In October 2022, the Panará reclaimed their traditional land after a two decade long legal and political battle. The two day ceremony featured many traditional songs and dances as well as other customs including the tora race. As they return to their original land elders have commented that "food sovereignty remains a concern" and that they are facing new challenges such as preserving their traditional culture with recent population growth and influences from other cultures.

== Village Orientation and Matrilineal Structure ==
Households follow matrilineal lines within each of the four clans with the village houses also arranged into four quarters for each of the clans. They also follow a uxorilocal habitation, where the male moves into the household of the woman when they marry, as well as the man becoming a member of his wife's clan especially after the first child is born. Marrying into the same clan, or having any romance between clan members is seen as “unthinkable” by the Panará. Furthermore, they live in villages in a circular structure around the inkâ, meaning “men’s house”; the surrounding structures' entrances face the inside towards the inkâ where meetings and discussions about the community take place. It is called the “men’s house” as the unmarried adult men sleep there traditionally.

== In popular culture ==
- On Paul McCartney's 1970 album McCartney, the closing track is called "Kreen-Akrore". Alcatrazz's 1983 album No Parole from Rock 'n' Roll also contains a song, 'Kree Nakoorie'.
- They appeared in The Amazon Trail game where Claudio Villas Boas sends the player on a mission to find them and ask them to join his park, naturally they refuse, just as he had thought.
- They were the subject of a documentary named "The Tribe That Hides From Man."

== See also ==
- Villas Boas brothers
- Indigenous peoples in Brazil
- Xingu National Park
