= Xakriabá =

Indigenous people of Brazil

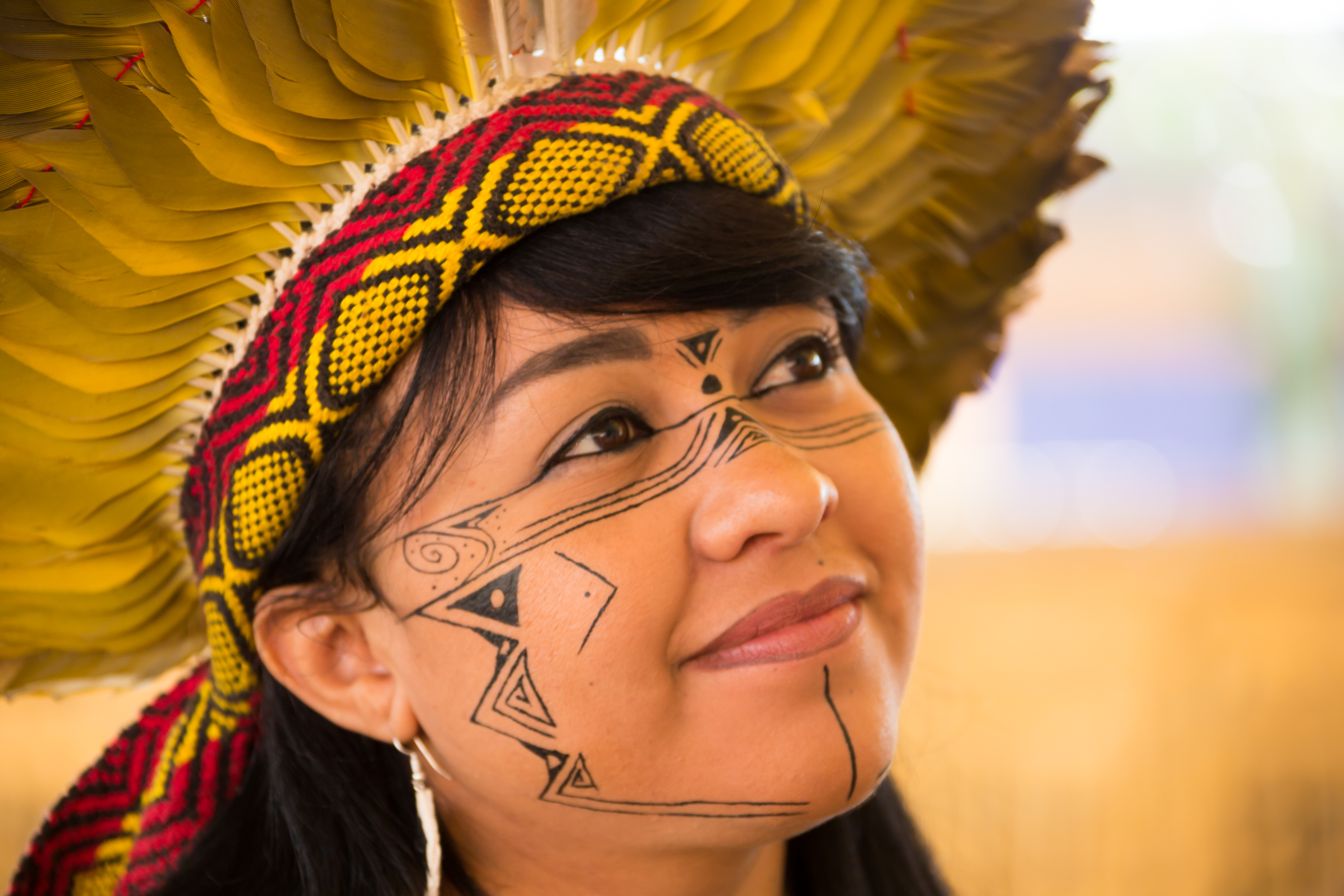
- Célia Xakriabá, Xakriabá congresswoman, in traditional dress

Total population
- 9,196 (2010)

Regions with significant populations
- Brazil (Minas Gerais)

Languages
- Portuguese, formerly Xakriabá

Religion
- traditional tribal religion, Roman Catholicism, Protestant Christianity

Related ethnic groups
- Other Gê peoples

The Xakriabá (Portuguese pronunciation: [ʃɐˌkɾi.ɐˈba]) are an Indigenous people of Brazil. One of the Gê peoples who spoke the Xakriabá dialect of the Akwe language, they used to live in the Tocantins River area. As of 2010, 9,196 Xakriabá people lived in the state of Minas Gerais.

== Name ==
The Xakriabá are also known as the Xacriabá, Chakriaba, Chikriaba, or Shacriaba people. They were formerly known as "acroás" and "coroás" in Bahia and "gamelas" in Piauí.

== Language ==
The Xakriabá speak Portuguese. The extinct Xakriabá language was an Akwẽ language, belonging to the Ge language family and was one of the Macro-Ge languages.

== History ==
In pre-colonial times, Xakriabá did not have a defined territory, but lived in the valley of the Tocantins River, in Goiás and along the São Francisco River. In the early 18th century, Matias Cardoso de Almeida, a pioneer, slaughtered Indians in the region. The Roman Catholic church forced local tribes to build missions. A statue of the saint, St. John of the Indians (in Portuguese): São João dos Índios) appeared at one of the missions, became a patron saint in the region.

In the 18th century, the Xakriabá settled in reservations (aldeias).

1927 marked the first major conflict between encroached ranchers and the Xakriabá. Ranchers forced the Xakriabá to build fences for cattle in the tribes' territory. The Xakriabá resisted by setting fire to the fences, and ranchers responded violently.
