= Panará language =

Macro-Je language spoken in Brazil

Panará
- Kreen Akarore, Ipewí
- panãra pẽẽ
- Pronunciation: [panə̃ˈɾa ˈpẽj̃]
- Native to: Brazil
- Region: Mato Grosso
- Ethnicity: Panará
- Native speakers: 380 (2008)
- Language family: Macro-Jê: Jê; Cerrado; Jê of Goyaz; Southern Kayapó; Panará
- Early form: Southern Kayapó

Language codes
- ISO 639-3: kre
- Glottolog: pana1307
- ELP: Kreen-Akarore

Panará (panãra pẽẽ, pronounced [panə̃ˈɾa ˈpẽj̃]), also known as Kreen Akarore (from Mẽbêngôkre Krã jakàràre, pronounced [ˈkɾʌ̃ jaˈkʌɾʌɾɛ]) and spelled Panãra, is a Jê language spoken by the Panará people of Mato Grosso, Brazil. It is a direct descendant of Southern Kayapó. Although classified as a Northern Jê language in earlier scholarship, Panará differs considerably from the Northern Jê languages in its morphosyntax and has been argued to be a sister language to Northern Jê rather than a member of that group.

== History ==
An early form of Panará, Kayapó do Sul, was formerly spoken by the Southern Kayapó. It was spoken in a vast region that comprised Triângulo Mineiro, Goiás, southeastern Mato Grosso, northeastern Mato Grosso do Sul, and northeastern São Paulo (Brazil), in particular on the rivers Rio Turvo, Corumbá, Meia Ponte, Tijuco, Rio das Velhas, Rio Pardo, Sucuriju, Aparé, Rio Verde, and Taquari.

Two dialects have been identified based on the scarce documentation of the language. The variety spoken in São José de Mossâmedes (as attested by Johann Baptist Emanuel Pohl and Augustin Saint-Hilaire in short wordlists) is characterized by the retention of the Proto-Goyaz Jê rhotic *r. In contrast, the variety spoken in Santana do Paranaíba (as attested by Kupfer, Carl Nehring, and Joaquim Lemos da Silva in short wordlists) and in the Triângulo Mineiro region (as documented by Barbosa in an extensive wordlist) innovated by palatalizing the rhotic (i.e. *r > j) in certain environments and is thought to be the ancestor of Panará.

Phonology:

Vowels
| | Front | Central | Back |
|---|---|---|---|
| Close | i, ĩ | ɨ, ɨ̃ | u, ũ |
| Mid | e, ẽ | ə | o, õ |
| Open | | a, ã | |

Consonants
| | | Labial | Alveolar | Palatal | Velar | Glottal |
|---|---|---|---|---|---|---|
| Stop | voiceless | p | t | | k | |
| Stop | prenasal | ᵐp | ⁿt | | ᵑk | |
| Affricate | voiceless | | t͡s | | | |
| Affricate | prenasal | | ⁿt͡s | | | |
| Fricative | | | (s) | ʃ | | |
| Nasal | | m | n | ɲ | ŋ | |
| Sonorant | | w | ɾ | j | | h |

/ʃ/ exists only in the Mossâmedes dialect. /ɲ, ŋ, h/ exist only in the Santana dialect.

- /t͡s, ⁿt͡s/ can be heard as [s, ⁿs] in free variation.

== Phonology ==
=== Consonants ===
The consonantal inventory of Panará is as follows.

| | | Labial | Alveolar | Palatal | Velar |
|---|---|---|---|---|---|
| Plosive | Plain | p ⟨p⟩ | t ⟨t⟩ | | k ⟨k⟩ |
| Plosive | Geminate | pː ⟨pp⟩ | tː ⟨tt⟩ | | kː ⟨kk⟩ |
| Fricative | Plain | | s ⟨s⟩ | | |
| Fricative | Geminate | | sː ⟨ss⟩ | | |
| Nasal | Plain | m ⟨m⟩ | n ⟨n⟩ | ɲ ⟨n⟩ | ŋ ⟨n⟩ |
| Nasal | Geminate | mː ⟨mm⟩ | nː ⟨nn⟩ | | |
| Approximant | | w ⟨w⟩ | ɾ ⟨r⟩ | j ⟨j⟩ | |

The underlying nasals /m n ɲ ŋ/ are post-oralized to [mp nt ns ŋk] preceding an oral vowel or one of /w ɾ j/, as in intwêê /nweː/ [iˈntɥej] 'new'.

The geminates occur both in underived roots (such as ippẽ [ipˈpẽ] 'foreigner') and at morpheme junctions, as in tepi /tɛp/ 'fish' + ty /tɯ/ 'dead' → [tɛtˈtɯ] 'dead fish'. Consonant length is phonemic in Panará, hence the inclusion of geminates in addition to the existing Panará obstruents. A geminate is a consonant that is held for a longer period of time than a singleton consonant. The geminate /ss/ is realized as [t͡s] by many speakers as a sociolinguistic variation between generations. The use of [t͡s] is associated with pre-contact with the colonizers and is thus used by the older generation of Panará speakers. The younger generation uses [t͡s] as well as the geminate [ss] as the language shifts.

=== Vowels ===
The vowel phonemes of Panará are as follows.

| | Oral | | | Nasal | | |
| | Front | Central | Back | Front | Central | Back |
|---|---|---|---|---|---|---|
| Close | i iː ⟨i ii⟩ | ɯ ɯː ⟨y yy⟩ | u uː ⟨u uu⟩ | ĩ ĩː ⟨ĩ ĩĩ⟩ | ɯ̃ ɯ̃ː ⟨ỹ ỹỹ⟩ | ũ ũː ⟨ũ ũũ⟩ |
| Mid | e eː ⟨ê êê⟩ | ə əː ⟨â ââ⟩ | o oː ⟨ô ôô⟩ | ẽ ẽː ⟨ẽ ẽẽ⟩ | ə̃ ə̃ː ⟨ã ãã⟩ | õ õː ⟨õ õõ⟩ |
| Open | ɛ ɛː ⟨e ee⟩ | a aː ⟨a aa⟩ | ɔ ɔː ⟨o oo⟩ | | | |

The vowels /oː, ɔː, õː, eː, ẽː/ are realized as the diphthongs [ow, ɔw, õw̃, ej, ẽj̃] as a result of the phonological rule long vowel diphthongization. Low vowel reduction is also used in Panará; the vowel /a/ can be reduced to [ɐ] or [ə] when unstressed.

=== Syllabic structure ===
The known possible combinations for syllables in Panará are as follows: V, CV, C_{1}C_{2}V, V:, CV:, C_{1}C_{2}V:, CVC_{3}, CV:C_{3}, C_{1}C_{2}VC_{3}, C_{1}C_{2}V:C_{3}. Sequences where C_{1} and C_{2} share the same active articulator are disallowed phonotactically.

Syllabic Identification Chart
| Symbol | Permissible Phonemes |
|---|---|
| C | Any consonant |
| V | Any vowel |
| V: | Any long vowel |
| C_{1} | Nasal consonant or stop (either singleton or half of a geminate) |
| C_{2} | An approximant |
| C_{3} | Nasal consonant or a non-geminate consonant |

=== [i] epenthesis ===
It has been argued that many word-initial and word-final instances of [i] are epenthetic in Panará. Word-initial [i] epenthesis aligns with the following table where [T] refers to a singleton stop, [CC] references a geminate, and [NT] refers to the allophonic realization of nasal stops, like: [m͡p, n͡t, n͡s, ŋ͡k].

Lapierre epenthesis chart
| initial [i] in | [T] in root | [CC] in root | [NT] in root |
|---|---|---|---|
| Monosyllabic | Optional | Obligatory | Obligatory |
| Polysyllabic | ungrammatical | Optional | Optional |

Examples for each scenario:

| Monosyllabic singleton [T] | /tu/ → [tu ~ iˈtu] 'belly' |
| Monosyllabic geminate [CC] | /kkjɯt/ → [ikˈkjɯːti] 'tapir' |
| Polysyllabic geminate [CC] | /ppẽkɤ/ → [pẽˈkɤ ~ ippẽˈkɤ] 'clothes' |
| Monosyllabic allophonic nasal stops | /ŋo/ → [iŋˈko] 'water' |
| Polysyllabic allophonic nasal stops | /nɔpãː/ → [tɔˈpãː ~ intɔˈpãː] 'small hole' |

Note: For the optional locations an alternate is also provided.

Word-final [i] epenthesis follows obstruent codas. Examples are shown below:

/tɛp/ → [ˈtɛːpi] 'fish'
/pəɾtɔt/ → [pəɾiˈtɔːti] 'chair'
/sɔt/ → [ˈsɔːti] 'stuff'

=== Stress ===
Stress falls on the last underlying vowel of a phonological word (the epenthetic [i] is never stressed). If after the application of the epenthesis the stress falls of the penultimate vowel, the stressed vowel is lengthened: aprẽpi /apɾẽp/ [aˈpɾẽːpi] 'picture, spirit', tepakriti /tɛpakɾit/ [tɛpaˈkɾiːti] 'an aquatic monster', joopy /jɔp/ [ˈjɔwpɯ] 'dog, jaguar'.

== Orthography ==
Orthography for Panará has been developed by Panará teachers, with help from literacy workshops, over the last 20 years. The following charts for both consonants and vowels are the result of the aforementioned workshops between Panará groups and academics, specifically Bernat Bardagil-Mas and Myriam Lapierre, in 2016 and 2017 and represent the orthography that has been adopted since then.

The orthography of Panará was shown above using the angle brackets in the phonetic tables.

== Morphology ==
=== Postpositional case marking ===
In Panará, their case-marking is done postpositionally. These postpositions "indicate various semantic relations, including place, time, cause, goal, means or source, among others". The postpositions include ablative case, adessive, allative, comitative, comitative-locative, desiderative, essive, final, inessive, instrumental comitative case, instrumental comitative, locative-inessive, locative, malefactive, perlative, possessive, and purposive.

Some of the more infrequent types include: the comitative-locative tân that expresses accompaniment at a location, the locative-inessive krɑ, which indicates location inside a physical container, the malefactive pêê, which expresses an event that takes place against X's will or interest, and the purposive suu which expresses purpose, but unlike the desiderative, it does not convey desire.

=== Nominal number ===
Nominals inflect for number in Panará. Singular is unmarked, dual is marked with the suffix -ra, and plural is marked with the suffix -mẽra. These suffixes may be attached to nouns and pronouns alike: ka 'you (singular)', kara 'you two', ka 'you guys (plural)'. The expression of number via suffixes is optional (this contrasts with the indexation of the argument number on verbs via clitics, which is obligatory).

Panará number suffixes

Nominal Suffixes
| | Singular | Dual | Plural |
|---|---|---|---|
| Absolutive | Ø | -ra | -mẽra |
| Ergative | Ø | -rân | -mẽrân |

Nominal number is inflected for singular, dual, and plural and pronominal clitics are also used for agreement with the verb.

=== Numerals ===
Panará does not have a set of numerals beyond one and dual. There are words for few and many. Some numerals were translated from Portuguese but most are just said in Portuguese if they are needed.

| Panará | pyti | pyti-ra | nõpjõ | inkjêti |
|---|---|---|---|---|
| Translation | one | one-DU (Two) | Few | Many |

=== Countability ===
Pluralization is always acceptable with animate nouns and sometimes acceptable for inanimate nouns with a numeral placed before it. However, some nouns are not acceptable even with the numeral addition, illustrating a category akin to mass nouns. Here are some examples of mass nouns:

| Panará | Translation |
|---|---|
| inkô | water |
| inta | rain |
| kwêkwê | mud |
| nanpju | blood |

== Clause type ==
Verbs in Panará may receive inflectional suffixes that have been analyzed as encoding mood (the available values being realis and irrealis, as in realis rõwa / irrealis rõwari 'to kill', realis too / irrealis tooj 'to fly, to dance') and clause type (paratactic vs. hypotactic, as in paratactic pĩri / hypotactic pĩra 'to kill').

== Mood ==
In Panará, mood is a more functional category that corresponds to tense. The irrealis mood is often thought of as future tense, whereas realis mood corresponds to non-future non-modal clauses.

== Syntax ==
In Panará, the roles of the arguments in a clause are indicated both by postpositional case marking and by a series of proclitics which encode the role of the arguments as well as their person and/or number features. Within X-bar theory, Panará has a very free positioning of XP's compared to other Jê languages.

In Panará, the roles of the arguments in a clause are indicated both by postpositional case marking and by a series of proclitics which encode the role of the arguments as well as their person and/or number features.

=== Postpositional case-marking ===
The case marking in Panará follows an ergative-absolutive pattern. Transitive agents (A) are marked by the ergative postposition hẽ, whereas transitive patients (P) and the sole arguments of intransitive verbs (S) are unmarked.

=== Clitics ===
Proclitics encode a wide array of features in Panará, including the role and the person/number features of the arguments (person indexes), mood, voice, and direction. The person indexes are organized ergatively in the realis mood and accusatively in the irrealis mood.

The table below shows the slots found in realis or conditional clauses.

Clitics in Panará (realis/conditional)
| 9 | 8 | 7 | 6 | 5 | 4 | 3 | 2 | 1 | 0 |
|---|---|---|---|---|---|---|---|---|---|
| mood | A | 2PL (A/S/P) | voice | direction | recipient | incorporated postpositional phrase (or person index) | dual (A/S/P) | absolutive index | verb |
| jy= RLS.INTR ta= COND tu= COND.INTR | rê= 1SG/DU nẽ= 1/3PL ka= 2 ti= 3SG/DU | rê= 2PL | pĩ= RCPR jĩ=/jã= REFL | py= REGR/ITER mỹn= CTPT | kjẽ= 1SG/DU pan= 1PL kãn= 2 mã= 3SG mẽ= 3DU ran= 3PL | | mẽ DU | ra-/r- 1SG/DU a-/k- 2 ∅-/s- 3SG/DU ra-/p- 1PL ra-/r- 3PL | verb (realis form) |

Irrealis clauses receive the mood marker ka.

== Language play ==
=== Code-switching puns ===
While all languages have and utilize various humour forms, code-switching puns are a form of humour which is quite specific to Panará. These puns arise from the interplay of Panará and Portuguese, the colonizing language. For example, after a doctor mispronounces someone's name [tenko] as [tanko], a Panará individual then repeats this mispronunciation to their friends and continues deforming its pronunciation until arriving at an end form [tokoti], meaning "swollen eye". Panará speakers also use their form of humour self-reflexively, where during a Panará conversation they add a boastful interjection with purposely mispronounced Portuguese (using a heavy Panará accent) such as "I know a lot". This code-switching humour originated from the neighbouring Kayabi nation ridiculing Panará speakers' mispronunciation of Portuguese; however, it was adopted by Panará speakers as a form of cultural humour with which they in turn ridicule outsiders' misuse and mispronunciation of Panará. Code-switching puns have since become culturally important to the Panará people. Forcing previously isolated nations such as the Panará and the Tupian-speaking Kayabi onto the same reserve can create tensions and loss of identity due to inter-tribal contact, in addition to contact with colonizers. Therefore, code-switching puns in Panará have become an important way of maintaining Panará identity and agency, both regarding inter-tribal tensions and as a way to fight colonization.

=== Importance ===
Documenting verbal play and pragmatic language unique to Indigenous languages is important at the general level: culture is carried in and transmitted by interpersonal language use (meaning that language use between people facilitates the expression and transmission of culture); additionally, stylistic diversity is socially communicative, since speech styles and genres vary from culture to culture. Therefore, studies of discourse, speech style, and genre can help with understanding and documenting Indigenous cultures, thereby working to resist the effects of colonization. Additionally, promoting unique language play may help increase the societal prestige of threatened Indigenous languages and raise awareness to support language and cultural revitalization.
