= Pedro Afonso =

Pedro Afonso may refer to:

- Pedro Afonso, Count of Barcelos (died 1350), Portuguese historian
- Pedro Afonso, Prince Imperial of Brazil (1848–1850)
- Pedro Afonso (sprinter) (born 2007), Portuguese sprinter
- Pedro Afonso, Tocantins, Brazilian municipality

== See also ==
- Pedro Alfonso
- Petrus Alphonsi
