= Apinayé language =

Macro-Jê language spoken by indigenous people of Brazil

Apinayé
- Panhĩ kapẽr
- Pronunciation: [paˈɲĩ gaˈpẽɾẽ]
- Native to: Brazil
- Region: Tocantins
- Ethnicity: Apinajé people
- Native speakers: 2,300 (2014)
- Language family: Macro-Jê: Jê; Cerrado; Jê of Goyaz; Northern Jê; Trans-Tocantins; Apinayé

Language codes
- ISO 639-3: apn
- Glottolog: apin1244
- ELP: Apinayé

Apinayé or Apinajé (otherwise known as Afotigé, Aogé, Apinagé, Otogé, Oupinagee, Pinagé, Pinaré, Uhitische, Utinsche, and Western Timbira) is a Northern Jê language (Jê, Macro-Jê) spoken in Tocantins, Eastern Central Brazil by some 2277 speakers of Apinajé people according to the most recent census taken by SIASI/SESAI in 2014. There are thirteen villages that speak the Apinayé language. The biggest and oldest villages include São José and Mariazinha; and the smaller villages are Cocalinho, Patizal, Buriti Comprido, Palmeiras, Prata, Cocal Grande, Serrinha, Botica, Riachinho, Bonito and Brejão. It is a subject–object–verb language.

Ethnologue considers Apinayé "developing," with a rating of 5 on the Expanded Graded Intergenerational Disruption Scale (EGIDS). It can be hypothesized that language transmission is high, since Apinayé was ranked as a threatened language in the past 10 years, but presently it is no longer at that level.

== Classification ==
The Jê family is the largest language family in the Macro-Jê stock. It contains eight languages, some of which have many dialects within them. The languages of this family are concentrated mostly in “the savanna regions of Brazil from the southern parts of the states of Pará and Maranhão south to Santa Catarina and Rio Grande do Sul”. Unfortunately, many other languages in the Macro-Jê stock have become extinct, because their East coast location meant for the first contact with Europeans, which, as written above, was violent and detrimental to many indigenous communities.

== Literature ==
A descriptive grammar of this language exists, written by researcher Christiane Cunha de Oliveira in her dissertation “The Language of the Apinajé People of Central Brazil”. Oliveira provides an extensive description and analysis of the phonology, morphology, and syntax of Apinayé. Other linguists have also contributed to the descriptive grammar of the language, including Callow's 1962 paper discussing word order; Burgess and Ham's phonological analysis including topics like consonant to vowel ratio, tone, and inventories of the different sounds of the language; and Callow's 1962 analysis of nominal categories and Ham et al.’s 1979 analysis of verbal categories.

Pedagogical grammars have been created for use in a bilingual classroom setting, with the intention of teaching both national culture and indigenous culture to young students. Sousa et al.’s “Apinajé Intercultural Bilingual School: For an Education Beyond the Ethnic Frontier” discusses this process in depth, and examines the value of having an Apinayé pedagogical grammar in the classroom. There is an intrinsic link between language and culture, and learning the Apinayé language helps children build a stronger connection with both their indigenous culture and the national culture of Brazil. It also is perhaps part of the reason that this language currently holds the status of “developing” on the EGID scale as mentioned above, as transmission of a language to children of the culture is vital to its survival.

== Phonology ==
The consonant and vowel inventory are as follows.

=== Consonants ===
		Labial	Alveolar	Palatal	Velar	Glottal
Nasal		m	n	ɲ	ŋ	
Stop	plain	ᵐb	ⁿd	ᶮdʒ		
Stop	prenasalized	p	t	tʃ	k	ʔ
Fricative		f	s			
Flap			ɾ			
Glide		w		j		

=== Vowels ===
	Front		Central		Back	
	plain	nasal	plain	nasal	plain	nasal
High	i	ĩ	ɨ	ɨ̃	u	ũ
High-mid	e	ẽ	ɘ		o	õ
Mid			ə	ə̃		
Low-mid	ɛ		ʌ		ɔ	
Low			a			

Just as in Mẽbêngôkre, there are underlying nasal vowels which surface independent of the nasal consonants.

=== Syllable structure ===
==== Onsets ====
The onset is optional in Apinayé, but there are no restrictions on which can occur in this position. C1C2V(C)-type syllables, where C2 is a voiced [+cont] semivowel or liquid are very common. CCC onsets are always /kvr/ or /ŋvr/.

==== Codas ====
All consonants other than /ŋ, ʔ/ are permitted in the coda. The possible syllable types are identical to what we find in Mebengokre, except for those in which there are /ʔ/-initial complex onsets.

== Morphology ==
Lexical categories include nouns, verbs, and postpositions. Inflection occurs on verbs, in accordance with person, constituency and nonfiniteness. Postpositions inflect for person, if there is a lack of an overt dependent noun phrase.

=== Pronouns ===
In Apinayé, there are personal pronouns for the first, second and third persons; which generally occupy the second position in a main clause. The first person pronoun “includes the hortative and plural inclusive distinctions”; other clitics are used to differentiate number distinctions. Pronouns occur in the realis and the irrealis modes:

Person	Realis Mode	Irrealis Mode
1st person (inclusive)	pa	paj
2nd person	ka	kaj
3rd person	əm/ø	ja
Hortative	pu	puj

Based on the information available, it can be postulated that these are both subject and object pronominal forms. In pragmatically unmarked use, the pronoun works within a clitic sequence, where the mood marker is in the first position and potentially a tense/aspect clitic that is stressed in the group. Phonological words are part of these sequences of clitics. In this instance, the pronouns do not carry stress; voice alteration is based on plosives occurring in the pronouns. For example:

Na [pa mɛ] ra pĩ kə
RLS 1 PL ASP tree cut
"We (exclusive) have already torn down the trees."

Na pa ra ku-ku
RLS 1.INCL ASP 3-eat
"We (inclusive) have already eaten."

In pragmatically marked use, a token of the pronoun precedes the sequence clause initially. Therefore, when the pronoun is stressed, the plosives are voiceless. This applies only to the realis form of pronouns:

Pa kɔt paj Zɛkabeti ɔ grɛ rač kumrɛč
1 IRLS 1.IRLS N. INSTR dance QTF INTS
"It’s me that I want to dance all night with Zé Cabere."

Pa na pa ic-kĩ nẽ
1 RLS 1 1-merry FCT
"It’s me that I am really happy!"

=== Clitics ===
==== Realis and Irrealis Modes ====
Numerous grammatical categories are expressed by positional, phrasal and word clitics. Clitics are used to distinguish between realis and irrealis mood in the language. The marker na is used to denote realis clauses; whereas irrealis clauses are indicated by the marker kɔt. The realis domain includes present, past, and habitual postpositions. The irrealis domain represents future, hypothetical, counterfactual, and conditional postpositions. Examples follow below:

Na ic-pe ku-bə
RLS 1-DTR 3.ACC-grab
"He took it from me."

Kɔt paj mũj mẽ wa grɛ
IRLS 1.IRLS DEM.DST ASSC DU dance
"I will dance with that one. (lit. ‘Me plus that one, the both of us will dance [together]’)"

=== Reduplication ===
Reduplication is a process that occurs in Apinayé. In terms of verbs, it is generally used to describe concepts, such as colours, onomatopoeic sounds; iterative, repetitive, or progressive events; and events that depict fragmentation (like ‘shatter’). Some examples are listed below:

ko.kot
"rest"

pɛ.pɛk
"drip repeatedly on the same spot"

tə̃.tə̃k
"hurt; ache"

ro.rok
"erode; collapse"

rə.rər
"yellow"

pre.prek
"be fast, rush"

This strategy reproduces the first foot right-to-left of the original stem. The majority of closed syllables lose their coda under these conditions. However that is not always the case. Reduplication does not only occur in verb stems, but also noun stems in some cases; though this occurs when reduplicated verbs convert into nouns, or they are compounds that include reduplicated verbal stems.

== Syntax ==
=== Valency change ===
Some of the syntactic processes of Apinayé are the valency changing operations of causativization. There are two ways of expressing causativization: periphrastic construction and morphological construction.

==== Periphrastic causative ====
The function of periphrastic construction is encoding indirect causation; the construction ɔ anẽ denotes the clause, while the result is in another clause. Furthermore, the clause which encodes the result functions as a different-subject clause in relation to the clause that expresses causation. For example:

na ka ri ic-t-ɔ anẽ pa rɔp kura
RLS 2 DEM 1-RP-do thus 1 dog hit
"You caused me to hit the dog. (lit. “You did me thus, I hit the dog”) [i.e. I was going to hit you with a stick, you stood behind the dog and I hit the dog instead of hitting you]"

This example shows that the two clauses share an argument; “the object of ɔ anẽ ‘do thus’ is coreferential with the causee”, shown by the independent pronoun at the beginning of the result clause.

The example below will illustrate an alternative situation:

na rɔp ri ic-t-ɔ anẽ nẽ pa amɲĩ pe i-ɲ-õ gwra kago kapi
RLS dog DEM 1-RP-do thus FCT 1 RFLX DTR 1-PSSR buriti juice spill
"The dog caused me to spill my juice. (i.e. it ran across my way, I tripped on it, and dropped the bowl with the juice)"

The particle nẽ occurs between the two clauses. The introduction of the conjunction postulates that “the clauses expressing cause and result are not as formally bound to each other” as in the previous example. Both clauses are under the scope of the modality marker, therefore it is a confirmation that they constitute a single sentence. Furthermore, this example differs with the previous ones due to causation; while the causers are animate beings for both examples, the second case shows that the causer is unaware of its actions, whereas the previous example has intentional causes.

The third syntactic pattern is the following:

i-j-apen ja na ri ic-t-ɔ anẽ na pa ra ic-kengʌ
1-RP-work DET RLS DEM 1-RP-do thus RLS 1 ASP 1-tired
"My work is already making me tired."

The inclusion of the modality marker na in the second clause “suggests that cause and result are expressed by two independent sentences”. However, the consultant of Oliveira noted that such constructions are odd, possibly because the higher agent is an event rather than a participant, and are only found in elicitation situations.

==== Morphological causative ====
The morphological causative is distinguished by the marker ɔ, which is preposed to the lexical verb of a clause. The marker is not a prefix to the verb, and may be labeled as a compound, since no other elements can exist between the two morphemes. This causativization applies only to monovalent verbs. For example:

na kawə dɘt
RLS côfo full
"The basket is full."

na ka kawə ɔ=dɘt
RLS 2 côfo CAUS=full
"You filled the basket."

The morphological causative focuses on the effect of the cause in the causal chain. Here, the causee “is affected by the agent/causer; thus, the causee is expressed simply as the patient argument of the verb derived with the causative morpheme ɔ”. Furthermore, “the lexical verb shares an argument with ɔ and that the latter has a very generic meaning makes it easier for ɔ to become reinterpreted as belonging to a distinct category − a derivational morpheme, in the case at hand − than for the lexical verb to be reinterpreted as a manner adverb”.

The establishment of the new function for ɔ as a morphological causative is “effected by the generalization in the usage of the construction”. The examples below, in which inanimate participants occupy the position of the higher agent, illustrate this:

na ra a-ɲ-õkwɨ a-pe čet pa
RLS ASP 2-home 2-DTR burn CNCL
"Your house burned down on you (i.e. to your detriment)."

na kupĩp kagrɔ i-n-ikrɛ ɔ=čet
RLS mat hot 1-shoulder CAUS=burn
"The hot mat burned my shoulder."

== Semantics ==
=== Quantification ===
==== Number clitics ====
In Apinayé number distinguishes between singular, dual, and plural categories for nouns and verbs. These are expressed by positional clitics: wa (dual) and mɛ (plural) which occur before nouns and verbs. The number clitics occur after the usage of person pronouns:

Mɛ a-krĩ [pu mɛ] pa krĩ
PL 2-sit.PL HORT PL 1.INCL sit.PL
"Have a seat, you all, let’s have a seat and gather."

The plural clitic mɛ can be a noun modifier, the dual clitic wa is not:

mɛ di jaja
PL woman DEF.ART.RDPL
"the women"

The plural and dual markers can also be used in compounding. An example is when they “combine with the indefinite article õ to form the indefinite pronouns mɛʔõ ‘someone’ and waʔõ ‘someone’”.

==== Quantifiers - Noun Phrases ====
In Apinayé, the quantifiers wa ‘dual’ and me ‘plural’ are positional clitics as well, and have the same distribution when it comes to person prefixes, as with full nouns; the clitics occur before:

[wa iɲ]-mə̃
DU 1-DAT
"for us (DU.EXCL)"

[me Ø]-karõ
PL 3-spirit
"the (deceased people’s) spirits"

[me a]-p-ubu
PL 2-RP-see
"...see you all"

With free pronouns, the clitics occur after:

kɔt [kaj wa]
IRLS 2.IRLS DU
"the both of you will…"

na [pa me]
RLS 1 PL
"we all…"

==== Quantifiers - Postpositional Phrases ====
The plural and dual clitics may co-occur with a postposition that is inflected for person. The quantifier clitic is modifying the person prefix attached to the postposition, and occurs in front of it. When it comes to the third person, the majority of postpositions take a zero prefix, though there are some irregular forms. Such examples follow below:

me Ø-kot
PL 3-after
"after them"

me kəm
PL 3.DAT
"for them"

wa a-pe
DU 2-DTR
"from both of you (i.e. to your detriment)"
