= Xerénte language =

Akuwẽ language spoken in Brazil

Xerénte
- Akwẽ-Xerénte
- Akwẽ
- Native to: Brazil
- Region: Tocantins
- Ethnicity: Xerente people
- Native speakers: (1,810 cited 2000)
- Language family: Macro-Jê: Jê; Cerrado; Akuwẽ (Central Jê); Xerénte

Official status
- Official language in: Brazil (Tocantínia)

Language codes
- ISO 639-3: xer
- Glottolog: xere1240
- ELP: Xerente

The Xerénte or Akwẽ-Xerénte language is an Akuwẽ (Central Jê) language (Jê, Macro-Jê) of Brazil. It is spoken by the Xerente people in the Tocantins state between Rio do Sono and Rio Tocantins.

== Phonology ==
=== Vowels ===
	Front		Central		Back	
	oral	nasal	oral	nasal	oral	nasal
Close	i	ĩ	ɨ		u	ũ
Close-mid	e	ẽ			o	õ
Mid			ə	ə̃		
Open-mid	ɛ				ɔ	
Open			a			

- /i, ɨ, u, a/ are realized as [ɪ, ɨ̞, ʊ, ɐ] in unstressed syllables.

=== Consonants ===
		Bilabial	Alveolar	Dorsal	Glottal
Nasal		m	n		
Plosive	voiceless	p	t	k	
Plosive	voiced	b	d		
Fricative	voiceless		s		h
Fricative	voiced		z		
Liquid		w	ɾ	j	

- [g] is heard as an allophone of /k/ before another consonant.
- /d/ may be realized as dental [d̪] before /i/.
- /s/ may be realized as postalveolar [ʃ] or retroflex [ʂ] before /i/.
- /h/ may be realized as a voiced velar [ɣ] or glottal [ɦ] fricative before /i/.
- /h/ is realized as a voiceless velar fricative [x] before /k/.
- /n/ is realized as a palatal nasal [ɲ] before /i, õ, ɔ/.
- /ɾ/ may be realized as retroflex [ɽ].

== Grammar ==
=== Personal pronouns ===
Person	Nominative	Emphatic	Absolutive	Tense-Aspect-Mood-Person markers
1S	wa	wahã	ĩ-	wa-
1P	wanõrĩ (nĩ)	-	wa-	wa-
2S	ka, toka	kahã	ai-	bî-, te-
2P	kanõrĩ (kwa), tokanõrĩ	-	ai-	bî-, te-
3S	ta	tahã	Ø-, ã-, ti-, t-	Ø-, mã-, te-
3P	tanõrĩ	tahãnõrĩ	Ø-, ã-, ti-, t-	Ø-, mã-, te-

The nominative and emphatic forms are free morphemes with the function of subject of transitive or intransitive sentences. The absolutive pronoun prefixes mark possessors, objects of postpositions, direct objects, subjects of nominal predicates and subjects of intransitive verbs with post-verbal operators.
