= Coroa language =

Coroa may be:

- another name for the Acroá language
- a possible extinct dialect of the Bororo language
