= Ancistrus karajas =

Scientific classification
- Kingdom: Animalia
- Phylum: Chordata
- Class: Actinopterygii
- Order: Siluriformes
- Family: Loricariidae
- Genus: Ancistrus
- Species: A. karajas

Binomial name
- Ancistrus karajas R. R. de Oliveira, Rapp Py-Daniel, Zawadzki & Zuanon, 2016

Species of catfish

Ancistrus karajas is a species of freshwater ray-finned fish belonging to the family Loricariidae, the suckermouth armoured catfishes, and the subfamily Hypostominae, the suckermouth catfishes. This catfish is endemic to Brazil.

== Taxonomy ==
Ancistrus karajas was first formally described in 2016 by the Brazilian ichthyologists Renildo Ribeiro de Oliveira, Lucia Helena Rapp Py-Daniel, Cláudio Henrique Zawadzki and Jansen Alfredo Sampaio Zuanon, with its type locality given as Igarapé Alemão, Parauapebas River, in the Carajás National Forest, the Tocantins River basin, in the Brazilian state of Pará, at 6°00'13"S, 50°34'34"W. Eschmeyer's Catalog of Fishes classified the genus Ancistrus in the subfamily Hypostominae, the suckermouth catfishes, within the suckermouth armored catfish family Loricariidae. It has also been classified in the tribe Ancistrini by some authorities.

== Etymology ==
Ancistrus karajas is classified in the genus Ancistrus, a name coined by Rudolf Kner, but when he proposed the genus, he did not explain the etymology of the name. It is thought to be from the Greek ágkistron, meaning a "fish hook" or the "hook of a spindle", a reference to the hooked odontodes on the interopercular bone. The specific name, karajas, is the name of an indigenous people, the Karajá, who live in the lower Tocantins basin where the type locality is located.

== Description ==
Ancistrus karajas is told apart from almost all other Ancistrus species by having no or a merely vestigial adipose fin with a single preadipose plate, as well as a combination of morphometric characters. It was described at the same time as the similar A. krenakarore with the two species differing in colour and pattern. Ancistrus species develop soft, bushy tentacles on the snout when sexually mature, these are better developed in the males than they are in females.

== Distribution ==
Ancistrus karajas is endemic to Brazil where it occurs in the lower Tocantins basin in Pará.
