= Acroá language =

Extinct language of Brazil

Acroá
- Acroá-Mirim
- Native to: Brazil
- Region: Bahia
- Ethnicity: Acroá
- Extinct: after 1818
- Language family: Macro-Jê: Jê; Cerrado; Akuwẽ (Central Jê); Acroá

Language codes
- ISO 639-3: acs
- Glottolog: acro1239

Acroá is an extinct Akuwẽ (Central Jê) language (Jê, Macro-Jê) of Brazil. It was spoken by the Acroá people around the headwaters of the Parnaíba and of the Paranaíba in Bahia, who were later settled in the missions of São José do Duro (Formiga) and in São José de Mossâmedes. The language went extinct before it could be properly documented; it is only known through a short wordlist collected by Carl Friedrich Philipp von Martius in 1818.Acroá is also known as Akroá, Acroamirim, Coroá and Koroá.
