= Bacuri, Maranhão =

Coordinates: 1.70278°S 45.1339°W

Bacuri
- Municipality
- Interactive map of Bacuri
- Country: Brazil
- Region: Nordeste
- State: Maranhão
- Mesoregion: Norte Maranhense

Population (2020)
  - Total: 18,654
- Time zone: UTC−3 (BRT)

Bacuri is a municipality in the state of Maranhão in the Northeast region of Brazil.

The mayor of Bacuri, Maranhão, is Márcio Hominho, whose term runs from 2024 to 2028.

The story of Bacuri is often told by the locals, who said that there was a priest there, and he was saying mass under a bacuri tree, and then a bacuri fruit fell, and he picked it up and said: - "What kind of fruit is this?", and one of them said "It's a bacuri!", and so the priest named the city Bacuri.

Tajé (Timbirá), an extinct Jê language, was once spoken in the municipality.

== See also ==
- List of municipalities in Maranhão
