= Central Jê languages =

Language family in Brazil

Akuwẽ
- Central Jê
- Geographic distribution: Brazil: Tocantins, Mato Grosso, formerly also Minas Gerais, Goiás, Distrito Federal, Bahia; formerly also Argentina
- Linguistic classification: Macro-Jê: Jê; Cerrado; Akuwẽ
- Subdivisions: Xavánte; Akwẽ-Xerénte; Xakriabá †; Acroá †

Language codes
- Glottolog: jece1235

The Akuwẽ or Central Jê languages are a branch of the Jê languages constituted by two extant languages (Xavánte and Akwẽ-Xerénte) and two extinct or dormant, scarcely attested languages (Xakriabá and Acroá). Together with the Goyaz Jê languages, they form the Cerrado branch of the Jê family.

== Phonology ==
The Akuwẽ languages share a number of characteristic innovations, such as the Akuwẽ/Central Jê vowel shift, the sound change *ka- > *wa-, and the occlusive merger, which distinguish them clearly from all other Jê languages.

A characteristic feature of the Akuwẽ languages is the existence of complex allomorphy patterns whereby the choice of the allomorph is conditioned by the position of the word within a syntagm (i.e. whether the word is in the middle or in the end of a syntagm). It has been suggested that it is possible to derive both allomorphs (those that occur syntagm-internally and those that occur syntagm-finally) from uniform underlying representations, which involve underlying codas.

== Historical development ==
The onsets of Proto-Cerrado have evolved in the following way in Proto-Akuwẽ.

Proto-Cerrado		Proto-Akuwẽ			
oral nucleus	nasal nucleus	oral nucleus (Proto-Cerrado non-high vowel)	oral nucleus (Proto-Cerrado high vowel)	before a diphthong	nasal nucleus
*p */p/		*p */p/	*b */b/	N/A	*m */b/
*mb */m/	*m */m/	*p */p/	*b */b/	N/A	*m */b/
*pr */pɾ/		*pr */pɾ/	N/A	N/A	*mr */bɾ/
*mbr */mɾ/	*mr */mɾ/	*pr */pɾ/	N/A	N/A	N/A
*w */w/		*w */w/			
*t */t/		*t */t/	*d */d/	*∅	*n */d/
*nd */n/	*n */n/	*t */t/	N/A		*n */d/
*r */ɾ/		*r */ɾ/		*∅	*r */ɾ/
*c */c/		*c */c/	*ĵ */ɟ/, *h */h/ (before *i)	*∅	*c */c/
*nĵ */ɲ/	N/A	*c */c/	N/A		
*j */j/	*ñ */j/	*ĵ */ĵ/, *c */c/ (before *i)		*k */k/	*ñ */ĵ/
*k */k/		*k */k/ (unstressed *ka- > *wa-)	*h */h/	*∅	*k */k/
*ŋg */ŋ/	*ŋ */ŋ/	*k */k/ (unstressed *ka- > *wa-)	*h */h/	*∅	N/A
*kr */kɾ/		*kr */kɾ/	*h */h/	*∅	*kr */kɾ/
*ŋgr */ŋɾ/	*ŋr */ŋɾ/	*kr */kɾ/	*h */h/	*∅	N/A
*g */g/		*g */g/	N/A		

Note that the onsets *p, *t, and *k(r) are synchronically found preceding not only non-high oral vowels in Proto-Akuwẽ, but also preceding innovative high vowels (*i, *u < Proto-Cerrado *ê, *ô) and nasal vowels (such as *õ, *ə̃ < *u, *a). The reflexes *b, *d, and *h are found preceding only those vowels that were already high in Proto-Cerrado.

== Lexicon ==
=== Predicate number ===
The Akuwẽ languages commonly employ different lexemes for singular, dual, and plural predicates. Although the lexicalized expression of verbal number is pervasive in the Jê family in general, the Akuwẽ languages are remarkable in having triads (rather than dyads) of verbs contrasting in number.
