= São Paulo Kaingáng language =

Language

São Paulo Kaingáng
- Nhacfateitei
- Native to: Brazil
- Region: São Paulo
- Ethnicity: Kaingang people
- Language family: Macro-Jê: Jê; Southern (Kaingáng); São Paulo Kaingáng

Language codes
- ISO 639-3: zkp
- Glottolog: saop1235

São Paulo Kaingáng (Nhacfateitei) is a Jê language of Brazil. It exhibits significant differences from Kaingang and is thought to have been influenced by the Terêna language, which belongs to the Arawakan languages.
