= Xerente =

Brazilian Indigenous group

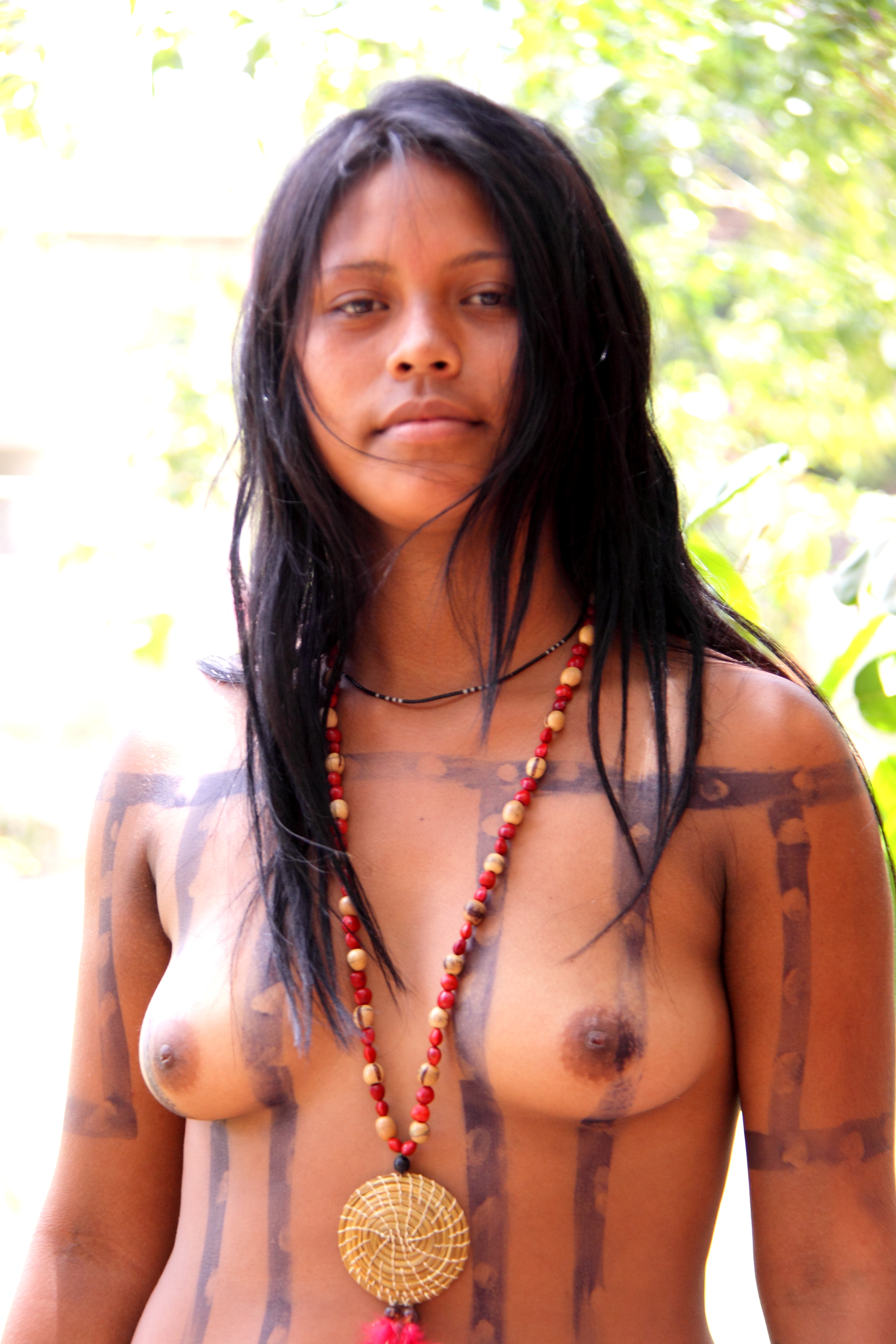
Xerente woman

Xerente (alternate Sherenté, Xerentes, and Xerénte) are an Indigenous people of Brazil living in Tocantins.

The Xerente are a Central Jê people related to the Xavante. They maintained generally "peaceful" relations with outsiders from the nineteenth century onward. Their villages were traditionally built in a semi-circular fashion, but the society has largely assimilated Brazilian standards of organization. As of 2007 use of the native language among the 1813 members is universal, with most being monolingual until age 5.

The Xerente creation myth is based on the duality of mythic heroes embedded in the sun and the moon, and this has resulted in a division between the exogamous moieties, with the sun moiety being called Doí and the moon Wahirê, each consisting of three or four clans.

In 2010, once the Programa de Compensação Ambiental Xerente (PROCAMBIX), one of the first structured compensation programs for Indigenous peoples in Brazil, for the impact of the Lajeado Dam, had caused, the Xerente attempted a class action suit to claim additional compensation for the dam's ongoing impacts. Following a lengthy court case, in 2013 a judge decided in favour of the dam's builders, Investco, an ad hoc consortium formed of the Rede Group, Companhia Energética de Brasília (CEB), and the multinational Energias de Portugal (EDP).
