= Kayapo language =

Northern Je language spoken in Brazil

Mẽbêngôkre
- Kayapó
- Mẽbêngôkre kabẽn
- Pronunciation: [mẽbeŋoˈkɾɛ kaˈbɛ̃n]
- Native to: Brazil
- Region: Pará, Mato Grosso
- Ethnicity: Kayapó, Xikrin, formerly also Irã'ãmrãnhre
- Native speakers: 8,638 (2010)
- Language family: Macro-Jê: Jê; Cerrado; Jê of Goyaz; Northern Jê; Trans-Tocantins; Trans-Araguaia; Mẽbêngôkre
- Dialects: Kayapó; Xikrin

Language codes
- ISO 639-3: txu
- Glottolog: kaya1330
- ELP: Mebengokre

Mẽbêngôkre (endonym: Mẽbêngôkre kabẽn [mẽbeŋoˈkɾɛ kaˈbɛ̃n]), sometimes referred to as Kayapó, is a Northern Jê language (Jê, Macro-Jê) spoken by the Kayapó and the Xikrin people in the north of Mato Grosso and Pará in Brazil. There are around 8,600 native speakers since 2010 based on the 2015 Ethnologue 18th edition. Due to the number of speakers and the influence of Portuguese speakers, the language stands at a sixth level of endangerment; in which the materials for literacy and education in Mẽbêngôkre are very limited.

== Ethnography ==
The Mẽbêngôkre language is currently spoken by two ethnic groups, the Kayapó and the Xikrin, which, besides sharing a language in common, both use the endonym Mẽbêngôkre (literally “those from the hole of the water” "Although there are differences between the dialects spoken among the various ethnic groups, all recognize themselves as participants in a common culture.") to refer to themselves and to their language. They are also sometimes regarded as major subdivisions of a single ethnic group, the Mẽbêngôkre.

The label Kayapó (also spelled Caiapó or Kayapô) has at times been used synonymously with Mẽbêngôkre in the literature — that is, it has been taken to refer both to the Kayapó (stricto sensu) and to the Xikrin, as well as to the linguistic varieties spoken by these groups. In order to avoid ambiguity (and further confusion with the Southern Kayapó, yet another ethnic group which spoke a not very closely related language of the Jê family), the term Mẽbêngôkre is preferred in this article (unless a reference is made to the Kayapó as opposed to the Xikrin). The term Kayapó, whose original reference was restricted to the aforementioned Southern Kayapó, is an exonym of unknown origin. It has been sometimes etymologized as a Tupi-Guarani word meaning “those who look like monkeys”, but this has been disputed.

The first historical records of the Mẽbêngôkre language and culture made by Westerners date back to the end of the 19th century, when the French explorer Henri Coudreau came in contact with the Mẽbêngôkre-speaking Irã'ãmrãnhre group. Some records were made by the missionaries who arrived to Brazil later in the century to Christianize the indigenous people. Known authors of that period include Father Sebastião and Reverend Horace Banner, who lived among another Mẽbêngôkre (Kayapó) group known as Gorotire between 1937 and 1951. Although, “the Mebengokre [have been in] permanent contact with the surrounding non-indigenous population at various times, in most cases [there have been] catastrophic consequences. The Irã'ãmrãnhre are now extinct, and the population of the Gorotire group decreased by 80% during the first years of contact. Following such brutal experiences, some small groups refused to be approached by investigators and remain uncontacted around the Xingu and Curuá rivers.

Since the exploration period, academic linguists and anthropologists have investigated the Mẽbêngôkre and have successfully acquired a body of knowledge about this indigenous group. Since the early writings on the grammar of Mẽbêngôkre by the Summer Institute of Linguistics missionaries Stout and Thomson (1974), multiple academic researchers have worked on the language, including Marília Ferreira, Maria Amélia Reis Silva, Andrés Pablo Salanova, Lucivaldo Silva da Costa, and Edson de Freitas Gomes. A translation of the New Testament into Mẽbêngôkre was published in 1996, and there are literary works including myth and ritual stories and descriptions of the Mẽbêngôkre speaking communities.

Furthermore, the Brazilian organization ProDocult began a documentation project of the Kayapó language and culture in April 2009 and thus far have produced "150 hours of video recording, 15 hours of audio recording and more than 6,000 digital photos, in addition to ... films [containing] records of "culture" Mebengokre, and how could it be ... highly dynamic [in its] creative aspect."

== Phonology ==
The phonological inventory of Mẽbêngôkre is composed of 16 consonants and 17 vowels, including oral and nasal vowels. Mẽbêngokre has a series of voiced oral stops, which makes it unique among the Northern Jê languages in employing the feature [voice] for establishing phonological oppositions. All other Northern Jê languages lost Proto-Northern Jê voiced obstruents through devoicing.

=== Consonants ===
		Labial	Alveolar	Palatal	Velar	Glottal
Nasal		m ⟨m⟩	n ⟨n⟩	ɲ ⟨nh⟩	ŋ ⟨ng⟩	
Plosive/ Affricate	voiceless	p ⟨p⟩	t ⟨t⟩	t͡ʃ ⟨x⟩	k ⟨k⟩	ʔ ⟨’⟩
Plosive/ Affricate	voiced	b ⟨b⟩	d ⟨d⟩	d͡ʒ ⟨dj⟩	g ⟨g⟩	
Liquid		w ⟨w⟩	ɾ ⟨r⟩	j ⟨j⟩		

- /d/ (as in jaduj 'short', krwỳdy 'beak') is exceedingly rare.
- /t͡ʃ/ (as in xãn 'cat', jaxwe 'naughtly') is rare in the onset position.
- /ɾ/ in the coda position is always followed by an epenthetic echo vowel, which may be an exact copy of the preceding vowel or [i] (if the preceding vowel is /a/ or sometimes /ɔ ʌ/), e.g.
  - pari /paɾ/ [ˈpaɾi] 'his/her foot'
  - puru /puɾ/ [ˈpuɾu] 'garden'

=== Vowels ===
	Front		Central		Back	
	oral	nasal	oral	nasal	oral	nasal
Close	i ⟨i⟩	ĩ ⟨ĩ⟩	ɯ ⟨y⟩	ɯ̃ ⟨ỹ⟩	u ⟨u⟩	ũ ⟨ũ⟩
Close-mid	e ⟨ê⟩	ẽ ⟨ẽ⟩	ɤ ⟨ỳ⟩		o ⟨ô⟩	õ ⟨õ⟩
Open-mid	ɛ ⟨e⟩		ʌ ⟨à⟩	ʌ̃ ⟨ã⟩	ɔ ⟨o⟩	
Open			a ⟨a⟩	ã ⟨ã⟩		

The vowels /ã/ (as in mrã 'to walk', xãn 'cat') and /ũ/ (as in tũm 'old') are rare and mostly go back to earlier oral vowels /a/ and /u/ in certain environments. The vowel /ɯ̃/ (as in nhỹ 'to sit') is also somewhat rare.

In some analyses, Mẽbêngôkre has five diphthongs which occur word-finally only: uwa /uᵊ/, ija /iᵊ/, eje /ɛᵊ/, ôwa /oᵊ/, ĩja /ĩᵊ/. These are realized phonetically as [ˈuwa], [ˈija], [ˈɛjɛ], [ˈowa], [ˈĩj̃ã]. Other authors analyze them as monophthongs followed by a glide (/w/ or /j/) in the coda position, which is followed by an epenthetic echo vowel. Some examples follow.

Diphthongs alternatively analyzed as sequences of vowels and glides
spelling	pronunciation	diphthong analysis	vowel + glide analysis	translation
muwa	[ˈmuwa]	/muᵊ/	/muw/	to cry
kruwa	[ˈkɾuwa]	/kɾuᵊ/	/kɾuw/	arrow
krija	[ˈkɾija]	/kɾiᵊ/	/kɾij/	to raise (pets)
ngija	[ˈŋija]	/ŋiᵊ/	/ŋij/	large American opossum
jabeje	[jaˈbɛjɛ]	/jabɛᵊ/	/jabɛj/	to look for
ngrôwa	[ˈŋɾowa]	/ŋɾoᵊ/	/ŋɾow/	moriche palm
wapĩja	[waˈpĩj̃ã]	/wapĩᵊ/	/wapĩj/	black caracara
onĩja or nĩjari	[ɔˈnĩj̃ã], [ˈnĩj̃ãɾi]	/ɔ=nĩᵊ/, /nĩᵊ-ɾi/	/ɔ=nĩj/, /nĩj-ɾi/	far (Kayapó dialect)

=== Syllable structure ===
The maximal syllable structure of Mẽbêngôkre is /CCCVC/. Any consonant may occur as a simple onset. Complex onsets may by formed by a combination of one of /p b m k ŋ/ and one of /ɾ j/ (pr-, br-, mr-, kr-, ngr-, pj-, mj-, bj-, kj-, ngj-); /t n ɾ t͡ʃ d͡ʒ ɲ k ŋ kɾ ŋɾ/ can also combine with /w/ (tw-, nw-, rw-, xw-, djw-, nhw-, kw-, ngw-, krw-, ngrw-). The coda may be any of /p t t͡ʃ k m n ɲ ɾ j/ (in analyses which do not recognize the existence of diphthongs, also /w/).

== Stress ==
In Mẽbêngôkre, the stress is fixed on the final underlying syllable. Epenthetic vowels (echo vowels) are absent from the phonological representation and are thus unstressed (as in pari /paɾ/ [ˈpaɾi] 'his/her foot'). In diphthongs, the leftmost element is stressed (as in ngija /ŋiᵊ/ [ˈŋija] 'skunk'). The diminutive clitic -re is unstressed, as in ngôre [ˈŋoɾɛ] 'his/her louse'.

== Morphology ==
=== Finiteness morphology ===
As in all other Northern Jê languages, Mẽbêngôkre verbs inflect for finiteness and thus have a basic opposition between a finite form and a nonfinite form. Finite forms are used in matrix clauses only, whereas nonfinite forms are used in all types of subordinate clauses as well as in some matrix clauses (with a particular aspectual interpretation). The morphology associated with the finite/nonfinite distinction includes suffixation and/or prefix substitution. Some verbs lack an overt finiteness distinction.

The following nonfinite suffixes occur in the language: -rV (the most common option, found in many transitive and intransitive verbs) and its allomorph -n (following front nasal vowels), -nh (found chiefly in transitive verbs), as well as -k, -m, and -x (found in a handful of intransitive verbs).

Nonfinite suffixes in Mẽbêngôkre
finite	nonfinite	gloss
suffix -rV
mõ	mõrõ	to go (PL)
karê	karêrê	to weed
kuno	kunoro	to chase
kato	katoro	to exit
muwa	mỳrỳ	to cry
suffix -n
krẽ	krẽn	to eat (SG)
bĩ	bĩn	to kill (SG)
suffix -nh
mrã	mrãnh	to walk
djumjã	djumjãnh	to chew
kwỹrỹ	kwỹnh	to break
nhu	nhunh	to dry in the sun
kadjô	kadjônh	to tear
suffix -k
ty	tyk	to die
ruwa ~ rwỳ	rwỳk	to descend
suffix -m
tẽ	tẽm	to go (SG)
ikõ	kõm	to drink
dja	djãm	to stand (SG)
suffix -x
wangija	ŋgjêx	to enter (PL)

In a handful of verbs, all of which end in an underlying stop, the nonfinite form does not receive any overt suffixes, but it is nevertheless distinct from the finite form because the latter lenites the stem-final consonant (-t, -k → -rV, -rV).

Nonfinite suffixes in Mẽbêngôkre
finite	nonfinite	gloss
xêrê	xêt	to burn
ngõrõ	nhõt	to sleep
kari	kak	to cough
djukrari	djukrak	to belch
pôrô	pôk	to burn, to ignite
ajkjêrê	jajkjêk	to yawn

==== Erstwhile palatalizing prefix ====
A small set of verbs form their nonfinite forms by employing one of the aforementioned processes and a morphophonological process whereby the onset of the stressed syllable changes to dj, ’, or is deleted, whereas the nucleus of the stressed syllable is raised (if possible). This has been attributed to the influence of an underlying palatalizing nonfinite prefix in Proto-Northern Jê.

Erstwhile palatalizing prefix in Mẽbêngôkre
finite	nonfinite	gloss
kaba	kadjàrà	to extract (SG)
ga	djàrà	to roast (SG)
kuto (PL jato)	kuônh (PL jaônh)	to ignite
katwỳ	ka’uk	to grind, to pound
kate	ka’êk	to break into pieces
kujate	kujaêk	to push, to move away
ngõrõ	nhõt	to sleep
ngã	nhõrõ (Kayapó), nhãrã (Xikrin)	to give
(krã)ta	(krã)yry	to cut off (SG)
anẽ	anhỹrỹ	to do so, to say so

==== Prefix substitution or loss ====
In addition to the aforementioned processes, the finiteness inflection may involve prefix substitution or loss. For example, the valency-reducing prefixes are a(j)- (anticausative) and a- (antipassive) in finite verb forms, but bi- and djà-/dju-, respectively, in the nonfinite forms. In addition, some verbs which denote physiological activities or movement have a prefix (i- and wa-, respectively) in their finite forms but not in the nonfinite form.

Finiteness and prefix alternations in Mẽbêngôkre
finite	nonfinite	gloss
anticausatives
ajkadjô	bikadjônh	to tear (ANTIC)
abdju	bibdjuru	to hide (ANTIC)
akuno	biknoro	to get lost
antipassives
aptà	djàptàrà	to block
abô	djàbôrô	to whistle
ajarẽ	djujarẽnh	to tell, to narrate
physiological verbs
ikõ	kõm	to drink
itu	turu	to urinate
ikuwa	kwỳrỳ	to defecate
ipê	pêk	to fart
movement verbs
wajêt	jêt	to hang (SG)
wadjà	djàrà	to enter (SG)
wangija	ngjêx	to enter (PL)

=== Person inflection and case ===
In Mẽbêngôkre, postpositions, and relational nouns inflect for person of their internal argument by taking absolutive or accusative person prefixes. The accusative series is required by a subclass of transitive verbs (in finite clauses only) as well as by some postpositions; the absolutive series is the default one and is found with most transitive and all intransitive verbs in finite clauses, with all verbs in nonfinite clauses, with all relational nouns, and with some postpositions. External arguments of verbs are not indexed by person prefixes but are rather encoded by nominative (unmarked) noun phrases (including personal pronouns) in finite clauses, or by ergative phrases in nonfinite clauses. In nouns, nominative, absolutive and accusative are unmarked, whereas the ergative case is marked by the ergative postposition te.

The person prefixes which index the internal argument of verbs, postpositions, and nouns are as follows.

		Absolutive			Accusative		
		singular	paucal	plural	singular	paucal	plural
1st person	exclusive	i-	ari i-	mẽ i-	i-	ari i-	mẽ i-
1st person	inclusive	ɡu ba-	ɡuaj ba-	(gu) mẽ ba-	ɡu ba-	ɡuaj ba-	(gu) mẽ ba-
2nd person		a-	ari a-	mẽ a-	a-	ari a-	mẽ a-
3rd person		Ø- (+ elision of a stem-initial dj-/j-/nh-)	ari Ø- (+ elision of a stem-initial dj-/j-/nh-)	mẽ Ø- (+ elision of a stem-initial dj-/j-/nh-)	ku-	ari ku-	mẽ ku-

The nominative and ergative forms of the pronouns are as follows.

		Nominative			Ergative		
		singular	paucal	plural	singular	paucal	plural
1st person	exclusive	ba	ba ari	ba mẽ	ije	ari ije	mẽ ije
1st person	inclusive	ɡu	ɡuaj	ɡu mẽ	ɡu baje	ɡuaj baje	(gu) mẽ baje
2nd person		ɡa	ɡa ari	ɡa mẽ	aje	ari aje	mẽ aje
3rd person		Ø	ari	mẽ	kute	ari kute	mẽ kute

The pronouns have also an emphatic form, which is used when a pronoun is focalized and can also be considered a grammatical case on its own.

		Emphatic		
		singular	paucal	plural
1st person	exclusive	ba	ari ba	mẽ ba
1st person	inclusive	ɡu ba	ɡuaj ba	ɡu mẽ ba
2nd person		ɡa	ari ɡa	mẽ ɡa
3rd person		Ø	ari	mẽ

==== Nominative case ====
The nominative case expresses the subject of a transitive or intransitive verb.

Arỳm nẽ ba ari i-tẽ-m mã.
Already NFUT 1.NOM PAUC 1.ABS-go.SG-NF DAT
‘We are leaving.’

==== Ergative case ====
The ergative case marks the agent of a transitive verb in a nonfinite form and may cooccur with a nominative pronoun expressing the same participant.

Djàm nẽ ga aje ∅-omũ-nh kêt?
INT NFUT 2.NOM 2.ERG 3.ABS-see-NF NEG
‘Don’t you see it?’

==== Absolutive case ====
In nonfinite clauses, the absolutive case encodes the sole participant (subject) in intransitive verbs and the patient in transitive verbs.

∅-Wỳ-rỳ mã nẽ tẽ.
3.ABS-bathe-NF DAT NFUT go.SG.F
‘She/he is bathing / going to bathe.’

It is also used to encode the patient of some transitive verbs in their finite form (except for monosyllabic verbs compatible with overt nonfiniteness morphology, which take accusative objects), as well as the possessors of nouns and the complements of some postpositions.

==== Accusative case ====
The accusative case encodes the patient of monosyllabic transitive verbs compatible with overt nonfiniteness morphology in finite clauses.

Arỳm nẽ ba ku-ma.
already NFUT 1.NOM 3.ACC-listen/hear.F
‘I heard it already.’

=== Voice ===
In Mẽbêngôkre, transitive verbs may be detransitivized by means of an anticausative or an antipassive derivation. The anticausative marker is the prefix a(j)- in the finite form and the prefix bi- in the nonfinite form of the verb. The antipassive derivation is achieved by means of the prefix a- in the finite form and the prefix djà- or dju- in the nonfinite form of the verb.

Voice alternations in Mẽbêngôkre
transitive	intransitivized	gloss
anticausatives
pudju	abdju / bibdjuru	to hide (TR) → to hide (ANTIC)
kamẽ	ajkamẽ / bikamẽnh	to push → to move away
kuno	akuno / biknoro	to chase → to get lost
antipassives
jarẽ	ajarẽ / djujarẽnh	to say → to narrate
ku	aku / djàkuru	to eat.PL → to eat.ANTIP
ma	— / djumari	to hear (something) → to listen

=== Derivational morphology ===
==== Diminutive and augmentative ====
Mẽbêngôkre makes use of a diminutive suffix -re (which is always unstressed; after -t it has the allomorph -e, and after nasals it surfaces as -ne) and of an augmentative suffix -ti (which is always stressed). These attach to nouns and abundantly occur in the names of animal and plant species. The combination of -ti and -re is used in a number of nouns which denote human collectives, such as Gorotire and Mẽtyktire (names of Mẽbêngôkre subdivisions).

==== Non-productive affixes ====
In Mẽbêngôkre, many predicates appear to contain fossilized prefixes of different shapes (such as ka-, nhõ-, ku-, py-/pu-, ja-, dju-, nhĩ-), whose semantic contribution is not always straightforward. These have been variously referred to as classifiers or transitivity prefixes.

=== Reduplication ===
Reduplication may be used to convey repeated action and possibly transitivity, as in the following examples:

totyktyk ‘to strike repeatedly’	totyk ‘to strike’
kyjkyj ‘to make many scratches’	kyj ‘a scratch or cut’
krãkrãk ‘to swallow’	tokrãk ‘to swallow at once’

In some verbs, such as prõrprõt ‘to float up and down’, the final consonant of the reduplicated base changes from a stop /t/ to a rhotic /ɾ/.

== Syntax ==
Mẽbêngôkre is a head-final language.

=== Morphosyntactic alignment ===
Prototypically, finite matrix clauses in Mẽbêngôkre have a nominative–accusative alignment pattern, whereby the agents of transitive verbs (A) and the sole arguments of intransitive verbs (S) receive the nominative case, whereas the patients of transitive verbs (P) receive the absolutive or the accusative case, which has been described as an instance of a split-P alignment. There are only several dozen of transitive verbs which take an accusative patient, all of which are monosyllabic and have distinct finite and nonfinite forms. It has been suggested that all transitive verbs which satisfy both conditions (monosyllabicity and a formal finiteness distinction), and only them, select for accusative patients, while all remaining transitive verbs take absolutive patients in Mẽbêngôkre and other Northern Jê languages.

Nonfinite clauses (including all embedded clauses) are headed by nonfinite verbs and are ergatively organized: the agents of transitive verbs (A) are encoded by ergative postpositional phrases, whereas the patients of transitive verbs (P) and the sole arguments of all intransitive predicates (S) receive the absolutive case.

=== Classes of predicates ===
The following table summarizes the proposed classes of predicates in Mẽbêngôkre.

argument structure in finite clauses	type	examples
A^{NOM} P^{ACC}	transitive verb (ku-class)	krẽ ‘to eat’ (SG)
A^{NOM} P^{ABS}	transitive verb (default)	’ôk ‘to paint’
S^{NOM}	intransitive verb	tẽ ‘to go’ (SG)
S^{ABS}	relational noun	ngryk ‘angry’
Exp^{DAT}	absolute noun + dative experiencer	prãm ‘to be hungry’
Exp^{DAT} Stimulus^{ABS}	relational noun + dative experiencer	kĩnh ‘to like’

==== Transitive verbs ====
In Mẽbêngôkre, transitive verbs take accusative or absolutive patients in finite clauses, depending on the verb class. In nonfinite clauses, all transitive verbs take absolutive patients. Note that nouns do not receive any overt marking either in the accusative or in the absolutive case; the difference between these two cases is seen in the third person index, which takes the form ku- in the accusative case and ∅- in the absolutive case.

The transitive verbs which index their patient in the accusative case (in finite clauses) are known as ku-verbs. All ku-verbs are monosyllabic and have distinct finite and nonfinite forms. The remaining transitive verbs index their patient in the absolutive case. All verbs that belong to this class satisfy at least one of the following conditions:

- they contain at least two syllables (for example, pumũ ‘to see’, kaô ‘to suck’, ku’õ ‘to wash (solid objects)’),
- their finite and nonfinite forms are identical (for example, ’ôk ‘to paint’, kre ‘to plant’, djũn ‘to insult’).

Finite ku- verbs further differ from all other transitive verbs in that under certain circumstances they index their agent (rather than patient) on the verb. This happens when a second-person agent acts over a third-person patient:

Ga a-bĩ.
2.NOM 2.ACC-kill.SG.F
‘You killed it.’

== Semantics ==
=== Instruments, locations, and prototypical agents ===
Mẽbêngôkre extensively uses the nouns djà ‘container’ and djwỳnh ‘owner, master’ to denote instruments (or locations) and prototypical agents, respectively, as in idjàkuru djà ‘eating utensils; eating place; food’ (literally ‘the container of my eating’) or pi’ôk jarẽnh djwỳnh ‘teacher’ (literally ‘the owner of the telling of the book’). These nouns attach to the nonfinite (nominal) forms of verbs or to other nouns, and express meanings that in other languages are frequently conveyed by special kinds of nominalizations.

=== Tense and aspect ===
In Mẽbêngôkre, there is no morphological distinction between present and past, the completion or continuation of an action is determined by the narrative context. Aspectual distinctions may be conveyed by auxiliaries or by using a nonfinite form of a verb in an unembedded clause. The following sentence shows the role of verbal finiteness when determining aspect:

Krwỳj jã nẽ môp krẽ.
parakeet DEM NFUT yam eat.SG.F
‘This parakeet eats/ate (the) yam.’

Krwỳj jã nẽ ku-te môp krẽn.
parakeet DEM NFUT 3-ERG yam eat.SG.NF
‘This parakeet has eaten yam (at least once in its life).’

In the semantic interpretation of the first example, the position of the event with respect to the time of the utterance can only be determined by narrative context. In contrast, the occurrence of the nonfinite form of the verb in the second example makes the event not "anaphoric to discourse, but rather coterminous with the subject's lifespan (mutatis mutandis for inanimate subjects). This interpretation has been variously described as “stative” or “subject-oriented” (in the sense that it ascribes a property to the subject, rather than focusing on the event itself) in the descriptive literature.”

== Vocabulary ==
=== Kinship terms ===
Mẽbêngôkre has triadic kinship terms, which express at the same time the relation of a given referent both to the speaker and the addressee.

=== Loanwords ===
Mẽbêngôkre has been in contact with the distantly related Karajá language, as evidence by a number of Karajá loanwords in Mẽbêngôkre, especially in the dialect spoken by the Xikrin group; the source of these loanwords is thought to be the Xambioá dialect. There are also loans from the Tupian languages Yudjá (Jurunan group) and Língua Geral Amazônica (Tupi-Guarani group), as well as from a hypothetical extinct Northern Jê language. More recently, lexical borrowings have been adopted from Brazilian Portuguese. Examples include:

Loanwords in Mẽbêngôkre
Mẽbêngôkre word	gloss	source form	gloss
Loans from Karajá
warikoko (Kayapó dialect) watkoko (Xikrin dialect)	tobacco pipe	werikòkò (wèrikòkò, warikòkò) (female speech)	tobacco pipe
rara	kind of basket	lala	kind of basket
wiwi	song, chant	wii (Xambioá and North Karajá dialects, male speech)	Example
bikwa	relative, friend	bikòwa (female speech)	relative, friend
bero	puba flour	bèrò	puba flour
rorirori	kind of headdress	lòrilòri	kind of headdress
warabaê	kind of basket	wrabahu ~ wrabahi ~ wrabahy	kind of basket
waxi (Xikrin dialect)	fishing line	waxi	fishhook
benorã (Xikrin dialect)	Cichla monoculus	bènora	Cichla monoculus
awo	tree sp. (Xikrin dialect) ubá boat (Irã'ãmrãnhre dialect)	awò (Xambioá dialect, male speech)	canoe
ixe (Kayapó dialect) ixere (Xikrin dialect)	mirror	itxèrèna	mirror
Loans from Yudjá
karaxu	spoon	karaxu	spoon
awa	bird sp. (Troglodytidae)	uxixi auahanu	Campylorhynchus turdinus
Loans from Língua Geral Amazônica
môtôbi’y (Xikrin dialect)	peanut	mũnduβi	peanut
xãn	domestic cat	piʃãna	domestic cat
mokà	bag made of tucum fiber	#mboko	kind of bag
xoko	rufescent tiger heron	soko	heron
Loans from an unidentified Tupi-Guarani language (dubious)
’ôkti, ’ôkre	kind of potato	#ʔok	tuber
jaduj	short	#jatu-ʔi	short (diminutive)
Loans from a hypothetical extinct Northern Jê language
karinhô	tobacco	#kariɲo (< *karên-cô)	tobacco leaf
xururu	black-fronted nunbird	#tʃuɾuɾ (< *ĵôrôr)	black-fronted nunbird
Loans from Brazilian Portuguese
kape	coffee	café	coffee
kaĩ	wheelbarrow	carrinho	wheelbarrow, cart
kratô	tractor	trator	tractor
kubẽta	blanket	coberta	blanket
xibôrô	onion	cebola	onion
mukutêru	mosquito net	mosquiteiro	mosquito net
mikrôni	minivan	micro-ônibus	minivan
mãmãj	mother	mamãe	mom
papaj	father	papai	dad
wowo	grandmother	vovó	grandma
wôwô	grandfather	vovô	grandpa
xiw	uncle	tio	uncle
xija	aunt	tia	aunt
paku (Kayapó dialect)	pacu	pacu	pacu

== See also ==
- Kayapo people
