= Tocantínia =

Municipality in Tocantins, Brazil

Coordinates: 9°33′S 48°14′W

Tocantínia Portuguese: Tocantínia Xerénte: Krikahâ
- Municipality
- Interactive map of Tocantínia
- Country: Brazil
- Region: Northern
- State: Tocantins
- Mesoregion: Oriental do Tocantins

Population (2020)
  - Total: 7,617
- Time zone: UTC−3 (BRT)

Tocantínia (Akwẽ-Xerénte Krikahâ [kɾikahə]) is a municipality in the state of Tocantins in the Northern region of Brazil.

== See also ==
- List of municipalities in Tocantins
