= Xavante language =

Macro-Jê language spoken in Brazil

Xavante
- Aʼuwẽ
- Pronunciation: [aʔwẽ]
- Native to: Brazil
- Region: Mato Grosso
- Ethnicity: Xavante
- Native speakers: 9,600 (2006)
- Language family: Macro-Jê: Jê; Cerrado; Akuwẽ (Central Jê); Xavante

Language codes
- ISO 639-3: xav
- Glottolog: xava1240
- ELP: Xavante

Xavante (/ʃəˈvæntiː/ shə-VAN-tee) is an Akuwẽ (Central Jê) language spoken by the Xavante people in the area surrounding Eastern Mato Grosso, Brazil. The Xavante language is unusual in its phonology, its ergative object–agent–verb word order, and its use of honorary and endearment terms in its morphology.

The Xavante people are approximately 18,380 individuals in 170 villages as of 2014, but the language is spoken by 9,600 people, of whom about 7,000 are monolingual. The current speakers, made up of all ages, use the language vigorously and hold positive attitudes towards Xavante. It has been orthographically rendered as Chavante and Shavante, and is also called Akuen, Akwen, A’uwe Uptabi, A’we, Crisca, Pusciti, and Tapuac.

== Classification ==
Xavante is a member of the Jê language family, itself a member of the Macro-Gê stock. This stock is spoken in a wide distribution of non-central Brazil; Macro-Gê is also popular in the eastern, northern, and central, and southwestern parts of the country, as well as being distributed in nearby Bolivia, Paraguay, and Argentina, but the Jê family is its only remaining large subgroup, with other languages remaining in isolates due to extinction. Within Jê, its 16 languages are distributed in four divisions; northern, north-eastern, central, and southern, and are better preserved than other languages in the stock due to its inland-inhabiting speakers. Xavante is classified in the central, alongside Xerente, Xakriaba, and Akroa. The stock is marked by a large presence of nasal vowels, this also being marked in the proto- Jê reconstructed language. Consonant inventories of the Macro-Ge stock are of medium size, with Xavante historically undergoing a phonological change from velar consonants to glottal stops. All are mildly synthetic, without complex morphology, and have SV constituent orders.

== History ==
The Xavante people originate from the east of the Araguaia River, in what was then called the province of Goias. In the early 18th century, this area was heavily invaded by colonizers searching for gold, leading to the indigenous population in the area to suffer from epidemics and live in the residential settlements created by the government. Following this, in the late 18th and early 19th centuries, groups of indigenous people, now distinctly self-identifying as Xavante, settled in Mato Grosso; this area was relatively undisturbed until the 1930s.

At this point, the government under Getúlio Vargas initiated the ‘March to the West’ campaign within the National Integration Program, in which expansion to the interior of Brazil and ‘domestication of the Savage’ were heavily promoted. The Xavante people were used in print media as illustrations of newly ‘pacified’ people who had decided to ‘join Brazilian society’. In the meantime, groups including missionaries had invaded the Mato Grosso to try to convert the Xavanate into Catholicism; the indigenous people, angry at the unsolicited invasion, attacked the group in return. However, following this period until the 1960s peaceful contacts, in which goods were exchanged, were established.

From the 1960s to the 1980s, the Xavante land was coveted for farming and agriculture purposes; deals to arrange transfers to white settlers were often fraudulent, and land used for monocultures, such as entire fields of rice, or grazing. The people were transferred from Mato Grosso to southern Brazil, a less fertile region; however, the Xavante people then began the attempt to recover the land they had lived on prior to contact with settlers in the 1970s, with demands for territory being met with violence by large capitalist companies that now had hold of the areas. In 1981, six areas were demarcated to the Xavante, and in 1991, the rights to extensions of some areas were won. However, conflicts regarding the territories between the Xavante and Brazilian government continue today. Currently, there has been a Program of Documentation of Indigenous Cultures (PRODOCULT) devoted to Xavante, run by J.R. Welch and R. Costa; the permanent collection, containing images, text, cartography and more information on the Xavante people and language, is housed in the Museum of the Indian.

== Documentation ==
The Xavante language was first referenced in the 19th century, in works of comparative philology which used word lists from the language and overviews of its structure. In the 20th century, Xavante has been studied academically since the 1960s by both Brazilian and foreign linguists, starting with a grammar; papers from this period examined the language’s phonemes, syllable structure, as well as aspect and acquisition. By the 1980s, works on the syntax and semantics of Xavante were published, focusing on sentence initial devices and focus; the first Xavante-Portuguese dictionary was also produced by Hall, McLeod, and Mitchell, all of whom had researched extensively in Xavante (1987). Since the 1990s, more specific properties of the language have been researched academically, namely with respect to acquisition, name agreement, assimilation, morphology, and respect/intimacy relationships. A revised Xavante-Portuguese dictionary, again compiled by Hall, McLeod, and Mitchell, was released in 2004.

== Phonology ==
The phonology of Xavante is described by McLeod (1974) and revisited by Pickering (2010).

=== Vowels ===
All vowels have a length contrast.

	Front		Central		Back	
	oral	nasal	oral	nasal	oral	nasal
Close	i	ĩ	(ɨ)		u	
Close-mid	e				(o)	
Open-mid	ɛ	ɛ̃	ə		ɔ	ɔ̃
Open			a	ã		

- Pickering notes /ɔ, ɔ̃/ as unrounded /ʌ, ʌ̃/ and considers /ɨ, o/ to be allophones of /i, u, ʌ/.
- /i/ is [iː] when long and [ɪ] when short.
- /e/ is raised after /r/ in a non-initial syllable.
- /a/ is a central vowel. It is a rounded [ɐ̹] in certain stylistic conventions.
- /ɔ/ is a mid vowel [ɔ̝ː] when long, and a more open [ɔ] when short.
- /u/ is [uː] when long and [u] or [ʊ] when short.
- /ɨ, o, ɛ/ do not vary much.
- /ə/ is written ⟨ë⟩ in the orthography.

=== Consonants ===
==== McLeod (1974) ====
Xavante has ten consonants, /p t c ʔ b d j r w h/ illustrated in the chart below.

		Labial	Coronal		Glottal
		Labial	apical	laminal	Glottal
Obstruent	voiceless	p	t	c	ʔ
Obstruent	voiced	b	d		
Sonorant		w	ɾ	j	h

The phonetic realizations of these phonemes include those shown in the following chart:

		Labial	Coronal		Glottal
		Labial	apical	laminal	Glottal
Obstruent	voiceless	pʰ	tʰ	s ~ tʃʰ	ʔ
Obstruent	voiced	b ~ m	d ~ n	z ~ dʒ ~ ɲ ~ j	
Sonorant		w	ɾ	z ~ dʒ ~ ɲ ~ j	h

- /j/ varies between obstruent and sonorant, alveolar and palatal.

Xavante is highly unusual in lacking velar consonants, except for the labio-velar approximant /w/. At a phonemic level, it arguably also lacks nasal consonants, which is less unusual in the Amazon. The language however has a high degree of allophony, and nasal stops [m n ɲ] appear before nasal vowels. (Note: It can be argued either that these are nasalized allophones of the voiced obstruents, that is, that /b/ or /mb/ is pronounced [m] before /ã/, or that the voiced obstruents are denasalized allophones of nasal stops before oral vowels, with /m/ pronounced [mb] or [b] before /a/. The key point is that nasality is determined by the vowels, not by the consonants.)

===== Allophony =====
With so few phonemic contrasts, Xavante allows wide latitude in allophones of its consonants.

- P and T: /p/, /t/ are aspirated [pʰ], [t̪ʰ] as syllable onsets (at the beginning of a word, between vowels, or before /r/), and unreleased [p̚], [t̪̚] as syllable codas (at the end of a word or before a consonant other than /r/).
- C: /c/ freely varies among [tʃʰ, tsʰ, ʃ, s] as an onset, and [t̪ʲ, ʃ] as a coda (only preceding another /c/, as [tːʃ, ʃː]).
- ’: /ʔ/ is a glottal stop [ʔ].
- B: In a C or CC syllable onset before an oral vowel, /b/ is pronounced as a plain voiced stop [b] at the beginning of a phonological word, and as either [b] or as a prenasalized voiced stop [ᵐb] in the middle of a word. Before nasal vowels, as C or CC, it is pronounced [m].

As a syllable coda, /b/ is pronounced [m] before /h/ regardless of the following vowel's nasality, and optionally also as [m] before the oral allophones of the other voiced obstruents, /d/ and /j/: [bd, bdʒ] or [md, mdʒ]. It is [m] before [ɲ]. (Note: All voiced obstruents are presumably nasalized before all nasal allophones, though [mɲ] is the only sequence that is attested.)

- D: In a syllable onset before an oral vowel, /d/ is pronounced either as a plain voiced stop [d̪] or as prenasalized voiced stop [ⁿd̪]. Unlike /b/, it may be prenasalized at the beginning of a phonological word, not just as a syllable onset. Before a nasal vowel, it is pronounced [n̪].

As a syllable coda, /d/ is pronounced [d̪] before the oral allophone of a consonant, and as [n̪] before a nasal consonant.

- J: In a syllable onset before an oral vowel, /j/ is pronounced [dz, z, dʒ, ʒ, j], in free variation. Before a nasal vowel, it is pronounced [ɲ].

As a syllable coda, /j/ is generally pronounced [j], and is nasalized to [ȷ̃] or [ɲ] after a nasal vowel. (Note: It is not yet clear when it is [ȷ̃] and when it is [ɲ].) It is also nasalized to [ȷ̃] before a prenasalized stop allophone. Between oral vowels, the sequence /jb/ optionally takes an epenthetic [d]: [jb] or [jdb]. When [ɲ] is followed by an /h/, a nasalized epenthetic schwa separates them.

- R: /r/ is an alveolar flap, [ɾ], which is nasalized [ɾ̃] between nasal vowels.
- W: /w/ is similar to English w, but not rounded before the vowel /i/. (Note: As McLeod & Mitchell (2003:11) describe it, antes da letra ‘i’ é pronunciado como o ‘w’ inglês, sem arredondamento dos lábios e com um pouco de fricção. Em outros ambientes não há fricção e os lábios se arredondam mais "before the letter 'i' it's pronounced as the English 'w', without rounding of the lips and with a bit of friction. In other environments it doesn't have friction and the lips are more rounded" This would appear to mean that /w/ is a more-or-less typical labio-velar approximant [w] in most situations, with an unrounded semi-fricative allophone, approximately [ɣ˕], before the vowel /i/, though possibly a labially compressed velar [β̞ɣ˕] in that environment. McLeod (1974:4) had covered only the unrounded allophone: O fonema /w/ é um vocóide oral assilábico, não-arredondado posterior fechado alto sonoro. "The phoneme /w/ is an oral semivowel, unrounded high back [and] voiced.")
- H: /h/ has no place of articulation, but is a voiceless transition between vowels.

Vowels do not become nasalized because of nasalized consonants, so the only consonants that become nasal are those in a cluster preceding a nasal vowel (and coda /j/ after a nasal vowel); a preceding oral vowel blocks the nasality from spreading to preceding syllables.

==== Pickering (2010) ====
Pickering notes significant differences from McLeod in both observed phones and in phonemic analysis:

		Bilabial	Alveolar	Palatal	Glottal
Nasal		(m)	(n)		
Plosive	voiceless	p	t		ʔ
Plosive	voiced	b	d		
Fricative	voiceless		s		h
Fricative	voiced		z		
Liquid	oral	w	ɾ	j	
Liquid	nasal		(ɾ̃)	(j̃)	

- Segments in parentheses are allophonic.

=== Phonotactics ===
Xavante syllables are of the forms CV, CCV, CVC, CCVC, CV:, and CCV:; that is, all syllables begin with a consonant, sometimes two; they may optionally either end with a consonant or have a long vowel. Although a syllable may end in a consonant, a phonological word may not, apart from a few cases of word-final /j/.

The attested initial CC consonant clusters are:

/pr br ʔr ʔb ʔw/.

All seven obstruents occur in final position, but in a maximal CCVC syllable only /p b j/ are attested. Across two syllables, the following CC sequences are attested:

/pp, pt, pc, pʔ/
/tt/
/cc/
/ʔʔ ʔb/
/bb, bd, bj, br, bh/
/dd/
/jp, jt, jʔ, jb, jj, jw, jr, jh/.

There are also CCC sequences such as /pʔr/ (coda /p/ followed by onset /ʔr/).

The vowels /o/ and /ɨ/ are rare, and not attested in maximal CCVC syllables.

== Grammar ==
=== Morphology ===
In Xavante, morphological variations of words are a significant aspect of generating new constructions within the language. For example, morphology reflects honorific status, in that morphemes are used to denote relationships of intimacy and kinship. Similarly, social positions and situations of individuals are marked using morphological constructions; for instance, a’ama, a group of Xavante men trained in new forms of pre-existing words, are referred to by other members of the clan using a specific set of morphological forms. Xavante also uses a reflexive prefix, tsi-, in situations requiring this grammatical construction to be denoted; for instance, ʔmadə (to look at) becomes tsi-ʔmadə (to look at oneself). Finally, the postverbal morpheme ni appears when referring to a generic or unknown subject, as in ma ø-wæræ ni ("someone (unknown) killed him"). Morphological changes are important in generating meaning in Xavante, and reflect the possibilities of showing meaning using set morphemes.

As previously discussed, Xavante expresses relationships between people in its morphology. This is particularly reflected in familial connections; a child must use the respectful grammatical forms when growing older in reference to their parents and grandparents, and are scolded if they do not do so (Harrison 2001). For example, the morpheme a is added to refer to a second person singular; a boy asking his grandfather to give a favor to his grandmother is generated thus:

Ï 'radare ãhã õme a-te sãræ-re na apâsi da-te råne da
1SG gr.father.ENDR here there 2.RES-LTR put.down-DIM IMP later GEN-LTR eat PURP
"Grandfather, here, put this over there for (grandmother) to eat later."

Conversation between men and their fathers-in-law is also marked by use of honorific grammatical variants, used by both parties. Finally, a couple that has been arranged to be married also enter a specific relationship, known as dasiwasini, and must use grammatical forms denoting respect. In all, morphological variation in Xavante is critical to displaying intimacy and closeness between people, and in marking where such a relationship exists through the way they refer to one another, with more personal relationships being denoted by special grammatical forms. Also previously discussed was the use of the post-verbal morpheme ni when referring to unknown subjects. This is formally known as a "non-referential subject", in that the subject does not refer to immediate entity in the world; for instance in saying ‘people’ as a collective instead of "my uncle". This morpheme is added in both transitive and intransitive clauses, for instance when saying both "people love me" and "people run". Ni is also commonly used with another morpheme, da, as a person prefix referring to a generic entity; for example, to use both transitive and intransitive sentences as examples:

Ma tô da-siwi ø-azâri ni
N1.PST CERT GEN-COLL 3-hit NREF.S
"People (unspecified group) collectively beat him up."

Da-'ahâ na te ta13-'ry'ry ni
GEN-a.lot REF N1 GEN-mourn NREF.S
"Lots of people are mourning."

In these ways, Xavante uses morphological variation to express concepts relating to abstract individuals that exist in a different way than concrete, specific people. By extension, the language uses morphology in general to conceptualize a variety of concepts, including closeness in relationships as well as personal prefixes.

=== Pronouns ===
Personal pronouns
	Singular		Dual		Plural	
1st person	/wa/, /ʔĭ/	‘I, me’	/wa tô/, /ʔĩwa/	'we, us' (dual)	/wa tô/, /ʔĩwa/	‘we, us’ (plural)
2nd person	/te/, /ʔa/	‘thou, you’	/ma tô/, /ʔwaʔwa/	'ye, you' (dual)	/ma tô/	‘ye, you' (plural)
3rd person	/te/, /∅/	‘he, she, it, him, her, they, them’	/ma tô/	'those two, the two of them' (3rdP.)	/te/	‘they, them’ (plural)

=== Case ===
The syntax of Xavante utilizes several types of case markings in its structures, marking the intransitive subject (S), transitive subject or agent (A), and transitive object or patient (O) in different ways. First, it distinguishes between a number marking system and a person marking system, with both containing several subsystems. The former uses a neutral subsystem when arguments fulfill certain criteria. It also includes a Nominative-Accusative subsystem when the (O) of a transitive argument falls under a specified category. Finally, the person marking system of Xavante is notable for having multiple subsystems. As a consequence, examining these case systems is vital to understanding the syntax of Xavante.

Xavante’s case systems emphasise the lexicalization of number systems. Particles in the language depend on whether it is in the 1st, 2nd, or 3rd person; whether the referent is in the subject, object, possessor, or complement position; and if the predicate is a noun (nominal) or a verb (verbal). Xavante also uses a singular, dual, and plural, and the number of the referent also dictate which number particle will be used. Within this number marking system, verbal clauses use a neutral marking subsystem, in which the marking of (A), (S), and (O) is identical whenever these arguments are singular or when (O) is definite and all three arguments are non-singular. A neutral system is marked for having the three arguments marked identically, and is common across languages. In Xavante, this situation is referred to as neutral because, in the first case, none of the three core arguments get marked, and in the second all get the same marking. An example is seen here:

∅ te ʔaj-wawa-j ʔwa:ʔwa
2 POT 2-cry-NZ DU
"Ye are both crying."

ʔwa dõrĩ ʔwaʔwa hã bĩtsi peʔa ∅ te ʔi-ʔrẽ-dẽ ʔwa
2 NS DU EMP one fish 2 POT 3-eat-NZ DU
"Ye (both) eat one fish."

The number system in Xavante also contains a nominative-accusative subsystem, found when (O) is non-singular and indefinite, when (O) is 1st person dual, or (O) is 2nd person dual and (A) 1st person plural simultaneously. A nominative-accusative system is marked when (S) and (A) are treated equally, while (O) differs, with the first two obtaining nominative marking and the third getting accusative. In Xavante, the nominative-accusative subsystem most commonly marks (O) for number while the other two are unmarked, although the reverse is also true. This is seen in the following example:

∅ te ti-ʔaʔa dzahu:re
3 POT 3-cough DU
"They are both coughing."

∅ te ʔi-bãdzã-ri dzahure tsiʔõdõ hã
3 ERG 3-make-NZ DU basket EMP
"It was made by both of them, the basket."

Xavante also uses a person-marking system, in which subjects and objects are marked differently depending on a number of criteria. The absolutive series marks both intransitive subjects and transitive objects; the accusative series marks 1st person dual, plural object, 3rd person singular, or dual or plural object when the subject is 2nd person singular, dual, or plural; the nominative series marks the subject of both transitive and intransitive clauses; and an emphatic series that marks pronouns to form emphatic pronominal expressions with both transitive and intransitive clauses. The person-marking system has more subsystems that the number one, with three variations of ergative-absolutive case markings. Ergative-Absolutive is marked as (S) and (O) being equal, with (A) being different, and the first two being assigned as ergative and the third assigned as absolutive. In Xavante, Ergative-Absolutive I uses cross-referencing on (S) and (O) only, with (A) receiving no marking. Ergative-Absolutive II is marked when (O) is in 3rd person indefinite and (A) is 2nd person plural. Ergative-Absolutive III is marked with the use of a particle or adposition after the noun, with (A) receiving a mark and (S) and (O) not receiving one, and is only used in relative and subordinate transitive clauses or negated independent transitive clauses:

ʔwa ∅ ʔwa-ʔaʔa dĩ
1 POT 1-cough DU
"We both cough."

ʔwa ∅ ʔa-tsa-ri dĩ
1 POT 2-bite-NZ DU
"We both bit thee."

Xavante’s person marking system also contains a tripartite subsystem, in which (A), (S), and (O) are all treated differently. In Xavante, this specifically occurs as all arguments receiving different arguments from the different series previously discussed. This is seen here:

ʔwa ∅ ʔi:-wawa ∅
1 POT 1-cry SG
"I cry."

∅ bã te ʔiwa-tsa
2 PERF POT 1-bite
"Thou bit both of us."

Xavante’s person-marking system also has a variation of a Nominative-Accusative system, in which (S) and (A) are marked differently from (O), as shown in both example sentences above.

Finally, Xavante has two Split subsystems; the first, Split-S, is found in the subjects of nominal predicates. The second, Split-O, occurs in relative clauses. Overall, the person marking system in Xavante contains multiple subsystems depending on the situations in which they appear.

In all, Xavante uses a number of case-marking systems in its clauses that varies depending on number and person markings. It provides examples of a neutral system, Nominative-Accusative subsystems, Ergative-Absolutive subsystems, and split subsystems, varying based on different triggers.

=== Plurals ===
In the Xavante language, plurals as well as duals are used to mark arguments in a clause. The language differentiates between singular nouns and dual, of which there is a quantity of two, and plural, in which the argument contains more than two items. These are expressed using morphological methods, including units that are used in a variety of contexts, including in different combinations. These markings appear to be used particularly for human subjects, and overall are vital to the structure of a clause in Xavante.

Dual arguments in Xavante, particularly those referring to people, use one of several possible morphological units. In order to describe a pair of human arguments, it is first important to distinguish between the first, second, and third person. For using the dual first person as a subject ("We both"), the morpheme ʔwa is used at the beginning of the clause, with dĩ at the end of the clause; in combination they produce the first person dual. This is seen here:

ʔwa ∅ ʔa-tsa-ri dĩ
1 POT 2-bite-NZ DU
"We both bite thee."

When using the dual first person as an object, however, a different morpheme, ʔĩwa, is attached to the main verb:

∅ bã te ʔĩwa-tsa
2 PERF POT 1-bite
"Thou bit both of us."

When using the second person dual ("Ye both"), reduplication is used to denote optionality in the clause. In the first case, when "both" is implied, ʔwa alone is used at the end of the clause, with the reduplicated ʔwaʔwa occurring earlier as follows:

ʔwa dõrĩ ʔwaʔwa hã bĩtsi peʔa ∅ te ʔĭ-rẽ-dĕ ʔwa
2 NS DU EMP one fish 2 POT 3-eat-NZ DU
"Ye (both) eat one fish."

However, when the dual is not optional in the clause, only the reduplicated ʔwaʔwa occurs, at the end of the clause, as here:

∅ te ʔai-wawa-j ʔwaːʔwa
2 POT 2-cry-NZ DU
"Ye are both crying."

Finally, third person dual is also denoted similarly depending on whether the argument is in the subject or object position. For the former, the morpheme dzahurɛ is placed clause-finally, and denotes "They both", as seen here:

ʔõ dõrĩ ʔi-ts-i-oto dzahurɛ
3 NS 3-R-MED-bent DU
"They are both bent."

However, when the third person dual is in the object position, the same morpheme, dzahurɛ, is also used, as in the following example:

ʔõ dõrĩ hã ∅ te dza ∅-ʔatsabrõ dzahurɛ
3 NS EMP 3 POT PROJ 3-run DU
"Both of them will run."

In all, the dual marks all arguments in Xavante, and differentiates between first, second, and third person in subject and object positions.

Plurals in Xavante, in which more than two arguments are described, is expressed using its own variations of morphemes. In the first person and third person, dzaʔra is used clause-finally, as here:

ʔwa dõrĩ ʔiwa-dz-ĩ-oto dzaʔra
1 NS 1-R-MED-bent PL
"We are all bent."

ʔõ dõrĩ ʔi-ts-i-oto dzaʔra
3 NS 3-R-MED-bent PL
"They are all bent."

However, the second person plural is expressed differently, with the previous morpheme, dzaʔra, being combined with ʔwaʔwa in two positions, clause-medially after the initial person marker and clause-finally, as here:

ʔa dõrĩ ʔwaʔwa ʔaj-rare dzaʔra ʔwaʔwa
2 NS DU 2-small PL DU
"They are all small."

In all, the plural in Xavante is expressed with less variation than in the dual, but nonetheless is always important to marking quantity of human subjects in the first, second, and third person.

== Bibliography ==
- Brown, C.J.; Purcell, M. (2005). "There's nothing inherent about scale: Political ecology, the local trap, and the politics of development in the Brazilian Amazon". Geoforum. 36 (5): 607–624. doi:10.1016/j.geoforum.2004.09.001.
- Burgess, Eunice (1971). Duas análises das sílabas do xavánte. Lingüístico de Verão.
- Burgess, Eunice (1986). "Focus and topic in Xavante". Sentence Initial Devices. SIL.
- Burgess, Eunice (1988). Foco e Tópico em Xavante (PDF). Série Lingüística. Vol. 9. pp. 11–38.
- Da Silva, A.L. (1999). "The Akwe-Xavante in history at the end of the 20th century". Journal of Latin American Anthropology. 4 (2): 212–237. doi:10.1525/jlca.1999.4.2.212.
- De Souza, Luciene Guimarães; Santos, Ricardo Ventura; Pagliaro, Heloisa; Carvalho, Marilia Sá; Flowers, Nancy May; Coimbra Jr., Carlos E. A. (2011). "Demography and health of the Xavante Indians of central Brazil". Cadernos de Saúde Pública. 27 (10): 1891–1905. doi:10.1590/s0102-311x2011001000003. PMID 22031194.
- Santos, Ricardo Ventura (2008). Languages of the World and Their Case Marking. Belo Horizonte Faculdade de Letras da UFMG.
- dos Santos, J.P. (2008). Marcas pessoais, concordância de número e alinhamento em Xavánte (Thesis). Universidade de Brasilia.
- Garfield, S. (2001). Indigenous Struggle at the Heart of Brazil: State Policy, Frontier Expansion, and the Xavante Indians, 1937-1988. Duke University Press.
- Grimes, J.E. (1986). "Sentence initial devices". Summer Institute of Linguistics Publications in Linguistics. 75: 233.
- Hall, Joan; McLeod, Ruth; Mitchell, Valerie (1987). Pequeno Dicionário: Xavante-Português, Português-Xavante (PDF). Sociedade Internacional de Lingüística, Cuiabá, MT.
- Harrison, Alec J. (1990). "Language learning tips". Notes on Linguistics. 50: 9–10.
- Harrison, Alec J. (2001). "Xavante Morphology and Respect/Intimacy Relationships" (PDF). SIL in Brazil.
- Lapierre, Myriam; et al. (2019). Xavante Field Materials. Survey of California and Other Indian Languages. doi:10.7297/X24Q7SGG.
- Latham, R.G. (1862). Elements of Comparative Philology. Walton and Maberly.
- McLeod, Ruth (1960). "Xavante grammar". Arquivo Lingüístico. 97.
- McLeod, Ruth (1974). "Fonemas Xavante" (PDF). Serie Linguistica. 3: 131–152.
- McLeod, Ruth; Mitchell, Valerie (1977). Aspectos da língua Xavante. SIL.
- McLeod, Ruth (2003). Learning Xavante monolingually. LinguaLinks Library.
- McLeod, Ruth; Mitchell, Valerie (2003). Aspectos da Língua Xavante (PDF). SIL publications, Cuiabá, MT.
- Neel, J.V.; Salzano, F.M.; Junqueira, P.C.; Keiter, F.; Maybury-Lewis, D. (1964). "Studies on the Xavante Indians of the Brazilian Matto Grosso". American Journal of Human Genetics. 16 (1): 52–140. PMC 1932461. PMID 14131874.
- Pickering, William Alfred (2010). A fonologia xavante: uma revisitação (Thesis) (in Brazilian Portuguese). Campinas: Universidade Estadual de Campinas, Instituto de Estudos da Linguagem. doi:10.47749/T/UNICAMP.2010.479341.
- Quintino, W. (2002). "Assimilação dos traços Voz e Nas em posição de coda em Xavánte". Línguas Macro-Jê. Vários estudos. Editoria de UEL.
- Rodrigues, A.D. (1999). The Amazonian Languages. Cambridge University Press.
- von Martius, C.F.P. (1867). Wörtersammlung Brasilianischer Sprachen. Friedrich Fleischer.
