= Goyaz Jê languages =

Subgroup of the Jê languages

Goyaz Jê
- Geographic distribution: Mato Grosso, Tocantins, Pará, Maranhão, formerly Minas Gerais, Goiás, Mato Grosso do Sul, São Paulo
- Linguistic classification: Macro-Jê: Jê; Cerrado; Goyaz Jê
- Subdivisions: Northern Jê; Panará

Language codes
- Glottolog: jese1235

The Goyaz Jê languages (also Northern Jê–Panará) are a branch of the Jê languages constituted by the Northern Jê languages and Panará. Together with the Akuwẽ (Central Jê) languages, they form the Cerrado branch of the Jê family.

== Phonology ==
=== Onsets ===
The consonantal inventory of Proto-Goyaz Jê is almost identical to that of Proto-Northern Jê, differing from it in that it had no contrast between *ĵ and *j and lacked the phoneme */w/. Proto-Goyaz Jê did have the sounds *ĵ and *j, but they occurred in a complementary distribution at that stage (in stressed and unstressed syllables, respectively). In Proto-Northern Jê, words with */w/ and */j/ (in stressed syllables) have been introduced from unknown sources (possibly via borrowings), as in *wet ‘lizard’, *wewe ‘butterfly’, or *jət ‘sweet potato’.

In Proto-Goyaz Jê, underlying nasals acquired an oral phrase preceding an oral nucleus (this is preserved in all contemporary languages with the exception of Mẽbêngôkre, which no longer has the postoralized allophones of the underlying nasal stops).

| | | Labial | Labial + rhotic | Dentialveolar | Palatal | Velar | Velar + rhotic |
|---|---|---|---|---|---|---|---|
| Stop | voiceless | */p/ *[p] | */pɾ/ *[pɾ] | */t/ *[t] | */c/ *[c] | */k/ *[k] | */kɾ/ *[kɾ] |
| Stop | voiced | */b/ *[b] | | (*/d/ *[d]) | | */g/ (nasal *[ŋ], oral *[g]) | |
| Nasal | | */m/ (nasal *[m], oral *[mb]) | */mɾ/ (nasal *[mɾ], oral *[mbɾ]) | */n/ (nasal *[n], oral *[nd]) | */ɲ/ (nasal —, oral *[ɲɟ]) | */ŋ/ (nasal *[ŋ], oral *[ŋg]) | */ŋɾ/ (nasal *[ŋɾ], oral *[ŋgɾ]) |
| Sonorant | | | | */ɾ/ *[ɾ] | */j/ (nasal *[ɲ], oral & stressed *[ɟ], oral & unstressed *[j]) | | |

The following table shows the usual reflexes of the Proto-Goyaz Jê onsets in Proto-Northern Jê and in Panará.

| Proto-Goyaz Jê | Proto-Northern Jê | Panará |
|---|---|---|
| *p */p/ | *p */p/ | p /p/ |
| *mb */m/ | *mb */mb/ | np /m/ |
| *m */m/ | *m */m/ | m /m/ |
| *pr */pɾ/ | *pr */pɾ/ | pj /pj/, pr /pɾ/ |
| *mbr */mɾ/ | *mbr */mɾ/ | npj /mj/, npr /mɾ/ |
| *mr */mɾ/ | *mr */mɾ/ | ? |
| *b */b/ | *b */b/ | p /p/ |
| *t */t/ | *t */t/ | t /t/ |
| *nd */n/ | *nd */n/ | nt /n/ |
| *n */n/ | *n */n/ | n /n/ |
| *d */d/ | *d */d/ | h /∅/ |
| *r */ɾ/ | *r */ɾ/ | j /j/, r /ɾ/ |
| *c */c/ | *c */c/ | s /s/ |
| *nĵ */ɲ/ | *nĵ */ɲ/ | ns /ɲ/ |
| *ñ */j/ | *ñ */ɟ/ | j /j/ |
| *ĵ */j/ | *ĵ */ɟ/ | s /s/ |
| *j */j/ | *j */ɟ/ | j /j/ |
| *k */k/ | *k */k/ | k /k/ (*kaC- > aC-, *kaNC- > nãnC-, *kuC- > [i]CC-) |
| *ŋg */ŋ/ | *ŋg /ŋ/ | nk /ŋ/ |
| *ŋ */ŋ/ | *ŋ /ŋ/ | nk /ŋ/ |
| *kr */kɾ/ | *kr /kɾ/ | kj /kj/, kr /kɾ/ |
| *ŋgr */ŋɾ/ | *ŋgr /ŋɾ/ | ŋkj /ŋj/ |
| *ŋr */ŋɾ/ | *ŋr /ŋɾ/ | ŋkj /ŋj/ |
| *g */g/ | *g /g/ | k /k/ |

== Innovations ==
There are phonological and lexical innovations which identify Goyaz Jê as a valid group.

=== Fortition of */w j/ ===
In the Goyaz Jê languages, Proto-Cerrado *w is mostly reflected as a stop (Panará/Timbira/Apinajé/Kĩsêdjê p, Mẽbêngôkre b; only Tapayúna has w). This has been attributed to the sound change Proto-Cerrado *w > Proto-Goyaz Jê *b. Examples:

- Proto-Cerrado *wĩ > Proto-Goyaz Jê *bĩ ‘to kill (singular)’;
- Proto-Cerrado *waj’ > Proto-Goyaz Jê *ba ‘I (nominative)’;
- Proto-Cerrado *wê > Proto-Goyaz Jê *bê ‘ablative and malefactive’;
- Proto-Cerrado *jawê > Proto-Goyaz Jê *jabê ‘trustworthy’;
- Proto-Cerrado *wêkê > Proto-Goyaz Jê *bêkê ‘partridge’.

The fortition of Proto-Cerrado *j in stressed syllables has also been proposed as a defining innovation of Proto-Goyaz Jê.

=== Nasalization of */a u y/ ===
The oral vowels */a u y/ of Proto-Cerrado were nasalized preceding the nasal coda *-m’ in Proto-Goyaz Jê:

- Proto-Cerrado *kumtym’ > Proto-Goyaz Jê *kũmtỹm ‘capybara’;
- Proto-Cerrado *tum’ > Proto-Goyaz Jê *tũm ‘old’, etc.

=== Lowering of */y/ after velars ===
The vowel *y of Proto-Cerrado was lowered to *ə after velar onsets.

- Proto-Cerrado *kyj’ > Proto-Goyaz Jê *kə ‘skin, bark, cover’;
- Proto-Cerrado *ky > Proto-Goyaz Jê *kə ‘to sing (of birds), to whistle’;
- Proto-Cerrado *ky > Proto-Goyaz Jê *kə ‘to cut (plural)’;
- Proto-Cerrado *ŋgy > Proto-Goyaz Jê *ŋgə ‘men's house’.

=== Other changes ===
Other changes include:

- loss of the Proto-Cerrado codas *-m, *-n, *-j’;
- Proto-Cerrado *-pr(’) > Proto-Goyaz Jê *-r(’);
- Proto-Cerrado *-d > Proto-Goyaz Jê *-r;
- Proto-Cerrado *ja > Proto-Goyaz Jê *jê ~ *î;
- Proto-Cerrado *wa > Proto-Goyaz Jê *wa ~ *û (but *wə̂ in closed syllables);
- Proto-Cerrado *pᵊ- > Proto-Goyaz Jê *py-/*pu- (as per labial harmony).
