= Pedro Afonso, Tocantins =

Municipality in Tocantins, Brazil

Coordinates: 8°59′S 48°01′W

Pedro Afonso
- Municipality
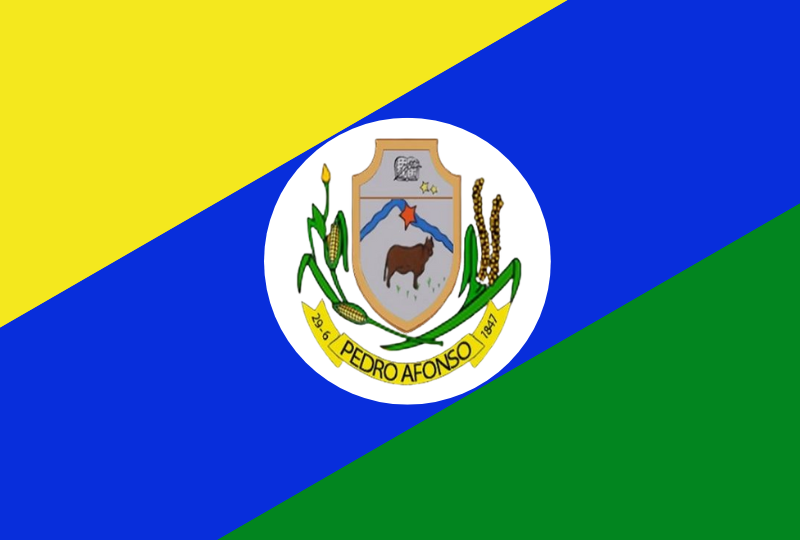
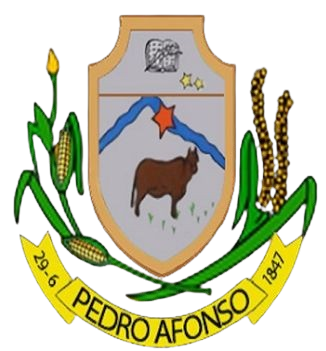
- Flag Coat of arms
- Interactive map of Pedro Afonso
- Country: Brazil
- Region: Northern
- State: Tocantins
- Mesoregion: Oriental do Tocantins

Population (2020)
  - Total: 13,773
- Time zone: UTC−3 (BRT)

Pedro Afonso is a municipality in the state of Tocantins in the Northern region of Brazil.

Xaraó, an extinct Jê language, was once spoken in the municipality.

== Geography ==
=== Climate ===
Climate data for Pedro Afonso (1991–2020)
Month	Jan	Feb	Mar	Apr	May	Jun	Jul	Aug	Sep	Oct	Nov	Dec	Year
Mean daily maximum °C (°F)	31.7 (89.1)	31.7 (89.1)	31.8 (89.2)	32.5 (90.5)	33.1 (91.6)	34.0 (93.2)	35.0 (95.0)	36.4 (97.5)	36.5 (97.7)	34.4 (93.9)	32.8 (91.0)	32.3 (90.1)	33.5 (92.3)
Daily mean °C (°F)	26.0 (78.8)	26.0 (78.8)	26.2 (79.2)	26.7 (80.1)	26.8 (80.2)	26.0 (78.8)	25.7 (78.3)	27.0 (80.6)	28.3 (82.9)	27.6 (81.7)	26.8 (80.2)	26.4 (79.5)	26.6 (79.9)
Mean daily minimum °C (°F)	22.5 (72.5)	22.6 (72.7)	22.7 (72.9)	23.0 (73.4)	22.4 (72.3)	20.2 (68.4)	19.0 (66.2)	19.7 (67.5)	21.9 (71.4)	22.9 (73.2)	22.8 (73.0)	22.7 (72.9)	21.9 (71.4)
Average precipitation mm (inches)	282.3 (11.11)	229.2 (9.02)	277.1 (10.91)	186.5 (7.34)	67.5 (2.66)	4.9 (0.19)	3.3 (0.13)	2.3 (0.09)	42.5 (1.67)	124.4 (4.90)	215.6 (8.49)	229.0 (9.02)	1,664.6 (65.54)
Average precipitation days (≥ 1.0 mm)	16.7	16.0	16.7	12.1	5.3	0.6	0.3	0.4	3.2	8.0	13.2	14.6	107.1
Average relative humidity (%)	84.3	84.2	85.2	83.4	79.0	71.9	65.0	58.1	60.2	72.0	79.8	82.1	75.4
Average dew point °C (°F)	23.5 (74.3)	23.6 (74.5)	23.8 (74.8)	24.0 (75.2)	23.4 (74.1)	21.2 (70.2)	19.5 (67.1)	18.9 (66.0)	20.4 (68.7)	22.5 (72.5)	23.4 (74.1)	23.5 (74.3)	22.3 (72.1)
Mean monthly sunshine hours	153.8	146.4	162.9	185.3	230.7	265.3	287.6	289.8	228.3	189.3	159.7	153.0	2,452.1
Source: NOAA

== See also ==
- List of municipalities in Tocantins
