= Jê languages =

Language group of Brazil

Jê
- Jê–Kaingang, Gê, Ye
- Geographic distribution: Brazil
- Ethnicity: Jê peoples
- Linguistic classification: Macro-Jê: Jê
- Subdivisions: Paraná; Cerrado

Language codes
- Glottolog: jeee1236
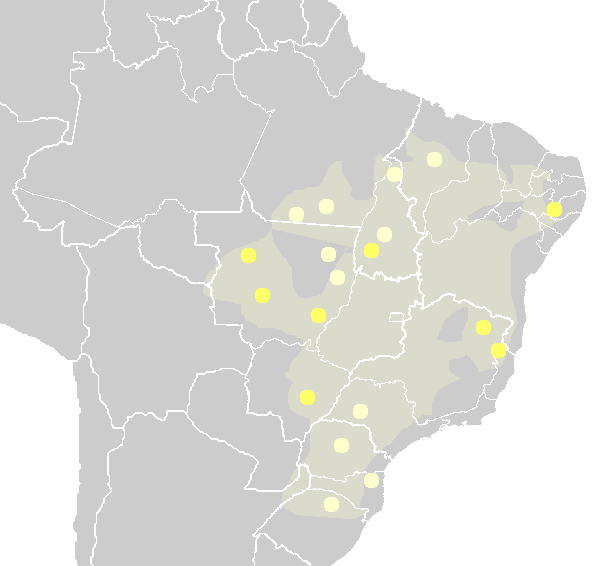
- Jê languages proper (clear yellow) and other Macro-Jê languages (dark yellow) in modern times. Shadowed area represent approximately extension in the past.

The Jê languages (also spelled Gê, Jean, Ye, Gean), or Jê–Kaingang languages, are spoken by the Jê, a group of indigenous peoples in Brazil.

== Genetic relations ==
The Jê family forms the core of the Macro-Jê family. Kaufman (1990) finds the proposal convincing.

== Family division ==
=== Ethnologue ===
According to Ethnologue, the language family is as follows:

- Northern Jê
  - Apinayé (2,300 speakers)
  - Mẽbengokre (Kayapó) (8,638 speakers)
  - Panará (Kreen Akarore) (380 speakers)
  - Suyá (350 speakers)
  - Timbira (Canela-Krayô, with the Canela and Kreye dialects) (5,100 speakers)
- Central Jê
  - Acroá (†)
  - Xavante (9,600 speakers)
  - Xerente (1,810 speakers)
  - Xakriabá (†)
- Southern Jê
  - Xokleng (760 speakers)
  - Kaingáng
    - Kaingáng (18,000 speakers)
    - São Paulo Kaingáng (†)
    - Ingain (†)
    - Guayana (†)

=== Loukotka (1968) ===
Below is a full list of Jê language varieties listed by Loukotka (1968), including names of unattested varieties.

Jê language varieties listed by Loukotka (1968)

Timbirá group

- Mehin – language spoken in the village of Araraparituya on the right bank of the Gurupí River, Maranhão state. Now perhaps extinct.
- Tajé / Timbirá – spoken in the village of Bacurí on the right bank of the Mearim River, state of Maranhão.
- Kukoekamekran – once spoken on the lower course of the Grajaú River, Maranhão. (Unattested.)
- Kreapimkatajé / Krepúnkateye – spoken on the middle course of the Grajaú River.
- Karákatajé – once spoken by the southern neighbors of the preceding tribe. (Unattested.)
- Krenjé – spoken at the sources of the Gurupí River.
- Remkokamekran / Remako-Kamékrere / Merrime – spoken on the Corda River and Alpercatas River, especially in the village of Ponto.
- Aponegicran / Apáñekra – language spoken at the sources of the Corda River.
- Krenkatajé / Canella – extinct language once spoken in the village of Suridade on the Alpercatas River.
- Sakamekran / Chacamecran / Mateiros – spoken on the Codo River and Flores River.
- Purekamekran – extinct language once spoken at the sources of the Grajaú River.
- Makamekran / Pepuxi – once spoken on the Manuel Alves Pequeno River.
- Kenpokatajé – once spoken between the Manuel Alves Grande River and Manuel Alves Pequeno River. (Unattested.)
- Kanakateyé – once spoken on the Farinha River, Maranhão. (Unattested.)
- Apinagé – language spoken between the Tocantins River and Araguaia River, near their confluence.
- Karaho / Carauau – once spoken in the Serra do Estrondo, Goiás state.
- Menren / Gavioes / Augutjé – spoken between the Tocantins River and Surubiu River in the state of Pará. (Only a few words.)
- Meitajé – spoken by a few individuals northeast of Itupiranga, Maranhão state.
- Norokwajé / Nurukwayé – spoken south of the Apinagé tribe on the Tocantins River, but perhaps extinct now. (Unattested.)

Krao group

- Krahó / Krao – language spoken between the Macapá River and Balsas River and the Serra das Alpercatas, Maranhão state.
- Krikati / Krikatajé – spoken between the Tocantins River and Grajaú River to the sources of the Pindaré River, Maranhão.
- Piokobjé / Bncobu / Pukobje – spoken at the sources of the Grajaú River.
- Kapiekran – once spoken on the Balsas River, Maranhão.

Kayapó group

- Kayapó / Ibirayára – originally in the interior of the state of Goiás, now between the Araguaia River and Tapajós River, state of Pará. Dialects:
  - Iraamráire / Meibenokre / Mekubengokrä / Cayapó do Rio Pau d'Arco – spoken on the Arrais River and Pau d'Arco River, state of Pará; now probably extinct.
  - Gorotiré / Cayapó do Xingu – spoken as a dialect of Cayapó between the Xingu River and Pau d'Arco River.
  - Chikrí / Xicri – spoken between the Macaxeira River and Pardo River, south of the Itacaiunas River, Pará.
  - Kuben-Kran-Keñ – spoken on the Ambé River near Altamira, Pará.
  - Dzyoré – spoken at the sources of the Cuxura River, Pará. (Unattested.)
  - Purucaru – spoken between the Fresco River and the sources of the Itacaiunas River. (Unattested.)
  - Metotíre / Chukahamai – spoken by a few individuals on the Culuene River near the falls of Von Martius and on the Jarina River, state of Mato Grosso.
  - Kruatire – spoken on the right bank of the Liberdade River, Pará. (Unattested.)
  - Krinkatíre – spoken by an unknown tribe in the state of Mato Grosso. (Unattested.)
  - Kren-Akárore – spoken by an unknown tribe, Mato Grosso. (Unattested.)
  - Mek-kran-noty – spoken on the Iriri River, Pará state. (Unattested.)
  - Kradahó / Gradaú – once spoken between the Araguaia River and Sororó River, Pará, now perhaps extinct.
  - Ushikrin – extinct dialect once spoken on the Vermelho River south of the Carajá tribe, state of Goiás.

Central group

- Southern Cayapó – incorrect name of a language the original name of which is unknown; originally spoken in the southern areas of the state of Mato Grosso on the Turvo River, Corumbá River, Meia Ponte River, Tijuco River, das Velhas River, Pardo River, Sucuriú River, Aporé River, Verde River, and Taquari River. Later found in the old mission of Santa Ana de Paranaíba and now spoken by only a few families in a village on the confluence of the Grande River and Paraná River, state of São Paulo. The following extinct languages may have been related:
  - Panariá – extinct language spoken once near Uberaba, state of Minas Gerais.
  - Mandimbóia – state of Minas Gerais on the Verde River and Sapucai-Guasú River.
  - Candindé – once spoken in the Itapecerica Valley near Divinópolis, Minas Gerais.
  - Bocoani – once spoken between the Turvo River and Preto River, Minas Gerais.
  - Morupak / Mirapác – once spoken between the Sapucai-Guasú River and Jaguari River, state of Minas Gerais.
  - Katágua – once spoken on the Jequiriçá River, Minas Gerais.
  - Puxiauá – language of the neighbors of the Katágua tribe.
  - Teremembe – once spoken on the Paraopeba River, Paranaíba River, Grande River, and Sapucai-Guasú River, Minas Gerais.
  - Araxó – once spoken in the vicinity of the modern city of Araxá, Minas Gerais.
  - Araxué – once spoken between the Serra Canastra and Mata de Corda.
  - Carayá – unknown language spoken by a tribe from the northern area of the Paraíba do Sul River, Minas Gerais.

Western

- Suyá – language spoken by a tribe that once lived at the mouth of the Suia-Missu River on the Xingu River; now in an unexplored area to the north.

Eastern

- Goyá – extinct language once spoken at the sources of the Vermelho River, Goiás state. (Unattested.)
- Xavante / Akwẽ / Akuän / Kayamó – spoken in the state of Mato Grosso in the Serra do Roncador and between the Tocantins River and Araguaia River in the Serra dos Chavantes.
- Xerente – spoken between the Tocantins River, Sono River and Urucuaí River in the interior of the state of Goiás
- Xaraó – extinct language once spoken in the village of Pedro Afonso on the Tocantins River. (Unattested.)
- Xakriabá / Chicriabá – extinct language once spoken in the state of Goiás between the Palma River and Corumbá River.
- Acroá / Coroá – extinct language once spoken at the sources of the Parnaíba River and Paranaíba River, state of Bahia.
- Aricobé / Abroa – once spoken on the Preto River and in the Serra das Figuras, state of Bahia. Several families have been reported in this location. (Unattested.)
- Takacuá – extinct language once spoken on the middle course of the Sono River, state of Goiás. (Unattested.)
- Guaiba – once spoken on Guaiba Island in the São Francisco River near the city of São Romão, state of Minas Gerais. (Unattested.)
- Krixá – once spoken in the São Marcos valley between the Urucuia River and Paracatu River in the state of Minas Gerais. (Unattested.)
- Goguez / Guegué – once spoken between the Tocantins River and Gurguéia River in the state of Piauí. (Unattested.)

Jeicó group

- Jaicó / Zyeikó – extinct language once spoken on the Canindé River, Gurguéia River, and Piauí River, state of Piauí
- Eastern Timbirá – once spoken in the state of Piauí between the Itaim River and Parnaíba River. (Unattested.)
- Arua – once spoken in Piauí state between the Itaim River and Jaguaribe River. (Unattested.)
- Pontá – once spoken on an island in the São Francisco River near the city of Quebrobó (Cabrobó), Pernambuco state; Portuguese is now spoken. (Unattested.)

=== Ramirez (2015) ===
Internal classification of the Jê languages according to Ramirez, et al. (2015):

Jê

- Southern Jê (dialect continuum)
  - Ingain ↔ Xokleng ↔ Kaigáng
- Northern Jê
  - Jê proper (Timbira-Kayapó dialect continuum)
    - Canela-Krahô ↔ Gavião-Krĩkati ↔ Apinajé ↔ Kayapó ↔ Suyá-Tapayuna ↔ Panará-Kayapó do Sul
  - Akuwẽ (various microdialects)
    - Xavante
    - Xerente (including Xakriabá, Akroá, Gueguê)

Ramirez excludes Jaikó as a possibly spurious language.

=== Nikulin (2020) ===
According to Nikulin (2020), the internal branching of the Jê language family is as follows:

Jê

- Paraná
  - Ingain
  - Southern Jê
    - Kaingáng
    - Laklãnõ
- Cerrado
  - Akuwẽ
    - Xerénte
    - Xavánte
    - Xakriabá
    - Acroá
  - Goyaz Jê
    - Southern Kayapó
      - Mossâmedes dialect
      - Triângulo dialect
        - Panará
    - Northern Jê
      - Timbíra
        - Parkatêjê; Kỳikatêjê
        - Core Timbíra
          - Krikati; Pykobjê
          - Krahô; Canela (dialects: Apànjêkra, Mẽmõrtũmre)
      - Trans-Tocantins
        - Apinajé
        - Trans-Araguaia
          - Mẽbêngôkre (dialects: Xikrín, Kayapó)
          - Tapajós
            - Kĩsêdjê
            - Tapayúna

Jaikó is treated as a separate branch of Macro-Jê.

Some sound changes and lexical innovations that define various Jê subgroups:

- Proto-Southern Jê *a < Proto-Jê *ô
- Proto-Cerrado *wa < Proto-Jê *ô
- Proto-Goyaz Jê: *am, *um, *ɨm > *ãm, *ũm, *ɨ̃m
  - Proto-Northern Jê: replacement of *kakũm ‘dry season’ (as in Panará akũŋ and Proto-Central Jê transl. mis – transl. '*wahum) with *aŋgrə
  - Proto-Timbíra: *c > *h
  - Proto-Trans-Tocantins: replacement of *a-mbə ‘eat (intransitive)’ with *ap-ku

== Proto-language ==
Proto-Jê
- Reconstruction of: Jê languages
- Reconstructed ancestor: Proto-Macro-Jê

=== Nikulin (2020) ===
Proto-Jê reconstructions by Nikulin (2020):

gloss	Proto-Jê
‘foot’	*par
‘arm, branch’	*pañ
‘tree, wood, firewood’	*pĩm
‘to rub, to clean’	*põ
‘to leave.PL’	*pôc
‘to fart’	*pê/*pê-k
‘hungry, to want’	*prə̃m’
‘coal, ember’	*prʏ
‘road’	*pry (~ *pryn)
‘wife’	*prũ
‘to hear, to understand’	*mba
‘liver’	*mba
‘to be afraid’	*-mbaŋ’
‘DAT’	*mə̃
‘to grab, to carry’	*mbə̂
‘tail’	*mbyn
‘celestial body’	*mbyt
‘good’	*mbec
‘PL; with’	*mẽ
‘liquid’	*mbên
‘husband’	*mbɪn’
‘to go.PL’	*mũ
‘ashes’	*mbrə
‘ant’	*mbrʊm’
‘relative by marriage’ (kinship term)	*mbre
‘to walk’	*wa
‘to take, to carry’	*wy
‘to untie’	*wô
‘to fly.SG’	*tə
‘tongue’	*ñũctə
‘INSTR’	*tə̃
‘strong, hard’	*tə̂t
‘to die’	*ty
‘capybara’	*k(r)Vmtym’
‘black, dark’	*tyk
‘fat’	*tom’
‘old’	*tʊm’
‘to carry’	*tu
‘horsefly’	*potu
‘NEG’	*tũ
‘to go.SG’	*tẽ
‘to dream’	*peti
‘to send’	*jandə
‘eye’	*ndəm
‘mother’	*nə̃
‘to lie.SG’	*nõ
‘bad or crooked’	*pondʊ (~ *pondʊn)
‘to hit’	*ra
‘wing; armpit’	*jara
‘celestial body’	*roñ
‘to transport liquid or to pour’	*ru
‘to leave, to abandon’	*re
‘to throw.PL’	*rẽ
‘root’	*jarê (~ *jarên)
‘to weed’	*-rê(C)
‘to look’	*rĩt
‘to weave’	*cy
‘seed’	*cym
‘to eat soft food, to suck’	*cô
‘leaf’	*côj
‘nest’	*jacê ~ *jVmcê
‘bandage, sling’	*-cĩ(C)
‘to chew’	*kapnĵa
‘bee, bumblebee’	*nĵy
‘to hang.SG’	*nĵô
‘to tickle’	*nĵê
‘to stand.SG’	*ja
‘to put vertically.SG’	*ja
‘nose’	*ñĩja
‘to eat.INTR, food’	*jañ
‘bitter’	*jə̂
‘smoke’	*ñĩjə̂
‘urine’	*jʏ
‘to sit.SG’	*ñỹ
‘tooth’	*jo
‘salt’	*kVjo
‘to tear, to rip’	*jô
‘pus’	*jʊ
‘postposition’	*jʊ
‘father’	*jʊm’
‘to hide’	*peju
‘to heat, to dry’	*nĵu
‘to sleep’	*ũt/*ñũt
‘thread, knot, cloth’	*jê (~ *jên)
‘female breast’	*ñũmjê(C)
‘vein’	*kujêk
‘to lay.SG’	*ji
‘name’	*jiji ~ *ñĩji
‘meat’	*ñĩ
‘hand (in compounds)’	*ñĩ(m)-
‘basket’	*kaj’
‘skin, bark’	*kyñ
‘lip’	*jar-kyñ
‘to dig’	*ko
‘mouth’	*jar-ko
‘sky’	*kVñko
‘fly, mosquito’	*kôp
‘tree, horn’	*kôm
‘horn’	*ñĩ-kôm
‘wind’	*kôk ~ *ka-kôk
‘to eat’	*kʊ
‘stone’	*kẽt
‘NEG’	*kêt
‘pit’	*kɪj
‘to split’	*kɪ ~ *kɪj ~ *kɪj’
‘offspring’	*kra
‘macaw’	*krat
‘head’	*krỹñ
‘knee’	*jVkrỹñ
‘chin, beak’	*krot
‘hole’	*kre
‘to plant’	*kre
‘thigh’	*krɪñ
‘to push against, to grind’	*ŋə̃(C)
‘feather, hair’	*ŋgoñ’
‘louse’	*ŋgô
‘to push against, to crumble’	*ŋũ
‘to enter.PL’	*ŋgɪ
‘toucan’	*ŋrũ (~ *ŋrũn)
‘egg’	*ŋgre
‘to dance’	*ŋgre
‘wrap’	*ŋrĩ(C)

For a more complete list of Proto-Jê reconstructions, as well as Proto-Southern Jê reconstructions, see the corresponding Portuguese article.

=== Ribeiro & van der Voort (2010) ===
Proto-Jê reconstructions by Ribeiro and van der Voort (2010):

gloss	Proto-Jê
‘relational prefix’	*j-
‘dative’	*mã
‘to open’	*kje
‘wing’	*j-ar
‘mouth’	*j-arkua
‘mouth’	*j-ar-
‘head’	*krã
‘feather’	*j-ar
‘path’	*prɨ
‘causativizer’	*-n
‘chief’	*paʔi
‘to suck’	*so
‘to catch’	*wɨ
‘to eat, to bite’	*ku
‘body’	*hǝ
‘to sing, to dance’	*ŋrɛ
‘to lay’	*j-i, *s-i
‘hard’	*tǝt
‘to stand’	*j-am
‘thorn’	*j-ĩ
‘to speak’	*wẽ
‘fart’	*pek
‘tree, wood, horn’	*ko
‘wood, firewood’	*pĩ
‘ashes, dust’	*mrɔ
‘to wash’	*pe
‘tongue’	*j-õtɔ
‘hand’	*j-ĩ-
‘hand’	*ɲ-ĩkra
‘to kill’	*wĩ
‘nest’	*j-ase
‘bone’	*si
‘to hear, to know’	*ma
‘egg’	*ŋrɛ
‘stone’	*kɛn
‘skin, bark’	*kɨ
‘to plant’	*krɛ
‘1st person’	*ĩj-
‘2nd person’	*a-
‘3rd person’	*ĩ-
‘3rd person’	*s-
‘pus’	*j-u, *j-ur
‘tail’	*mɨ
‘root’	*j-are
‘seed’	*sɨ
‘to sit’	*j-ã
‘hunger’	*prãm
‘earth’	*pɨka
‘to come’	*tẽm
