= Cerrado languages =

Language family

Cerrado
- Geographic distribution: Mato Grosso, Tocantins, Pará, Maranhão, formerly Piauí, Bahia, Minas Gerais, Goiás, Mato Grosso do Sul, São Paulo
- Linguistic classification: Macro-Jê: Jê; Cerrado
- Proto-language: Proto-Cerrado
- Subdivisions: Jê of Goyaz; Akuwẽ (Central Jê)

Language codes
- Glottolog: cerr1237

The Cerrado languages (also referred to as Amazonian Jê) are a branch of the Jê languages constituted by the Goyaz Jê languages and Akuwẽ (Central Jê).

== Sound changes from Proto-Jê to Proto-Cerrado ==
The occurrence of the consonant */g/ in Proto-Cerrado (as in */g/õt ‘to sleep’, */g/õ ‘to give’, */g/aj’ ‘you’) is believed to be an innovation; it has been claimed to have been inserted in onsetless-stressed syllables.

The Proto-Cerrado diphthongs *wa and *ja are believed to continue Proto-Jê monophthongs, which have been reconstructed as *ô and *ê₂. Other vowels which have been claimed to have innovated in Proto-Cerrado are:

- *ô (goes back to an unrounded vowel, reconstructed as Proto-Jê *ə̂₁);
- *u (a merger of earlier *u₁ and *u₂, distinguished in the Southern Jê languages as o and u, respectively);
- *ũ (a merger of earlier *ũ₁ and *ũ₂, distinguished as ũ and ỹ in Kaingang and as ũ and õ in Laklãnõ);
- *ə̃ (a merger of earlier *ə̃ and *ỹ, distinguished as ỹ and ĩ in Kaingang and as õ and ẽ in Laklãnõ);
- all vowels in the Proto-Jê unstressed syllables of the shape *pV- were neutralized in the Cerrado languages: Proto-Cerrado *pᵊ- (> Proto-Goyaz Jê *py-/*pu-, Proto-Akuwẽ *pi-).

== Sound changes from Proto-Cerrado to the daughter languages ==
=== Onsets ===
The simple onset inventory of Proto-Cerrado is */p m w t n ɾ c ɲ j k ŋ g/, and the only complex onsets are */pɾ mɾ kɾ ŋɾ/.

Their reflexes in the daughter branches are shown below.

Proto-Cerrado		Proto-Goyaz Jê		Proto-Akuwẽ			
oral nucleus	nasal nucleus	oral nucleus	nasal nucleus	oral nucleus (Proto-Cerrado non-high vowel)	oral nucleus (Proto-Cerrado high vowel)	before a diphthong	nasal nucleus
*p */p/		*p */p/		*p */p/	*b */b/	N/A	*m */b/
*mb */m/	*m */m/	*mb */m/	*m */m/	*p */p/	*b */b/	N/A	*m */b/
*pr */pɾ/		*pr */pɾ/		*pr */pɾ/	N/A	N/A	*mr */bɾ/
*mbr */mɾ/	*mr */mɾ/	*mbr */mɾ/	*mr */mɾ/	*pr */pɾ/	N/A	N/A	N/A
*w */w/		*b */b/		*w */w/			
*t */t/		*t */t/		*t */t/	*d */d/	*∅	*n */d/
*nd */n/	*n */n/	*nd */n/	*n */n/	*t */t/	N/A		*n */d/
*r */ɾ/		*r */ɾ/		*r */ɾ/		*∅	*r */ɾ/
*c */c/		*c */c/		*c */c/	*ĵ */ɟ/, *h */h/ (before *i)	*∅	*c */c/
*nĵ */ɲ/	N/A	*nĵ */ɲ/	N/A	*c */c/	N/A		
*j */j/	*ñ */j/	*ĵ (stressed)/*j (unstressed) */ĵ/	*ñ */ĵ/	*ĵ */ĵ/, *c */c/ (before *i)		*k */k/	*ñ */ĵ/
*k */k/		*k */k/		*k */k/ (unstressed *ka- > *wa-)	*h */h/	*∅	*k */k/
*ŋg */ŋ/	*ŋ */ŋ/	*ŋg */ŋ/	*ŋ */ŋ/	*k */k/ (unstressed *ka- > *wa-)	*h */h/	*∅	N/A
*kr */kɾ/		*kr */kɾ/		*kr */kɾ/	*h */h/	*∅	*kr */kɾ/
*ŋgr */ŋɾ/	*ŋr */ŋɾ/	*ŋgr */ŋɾ/	*ŋr */ŋɾ/	*kr */kɾ/	*h */h/	*∅	N/A
*g */g/		*g */g/	*ŋ */g/	*g */g/	N/A		

=== Nuclei ===
The inventory of the Proto-Cerrado monophthongs is reconstructed as follows.

oral			nasal		
*i */i/	*y */ɨ/	*u */u/	*ĩ */ĩ/	*ỹ */ɨ̃/	
*ê */e/	*ə̂ */ɘ/	*ô */o/			
*e */ɛ/	*ə */ɜ/	*o */ɔ/	*ẽ */ɛ̃/	*ə̃ */ɜ̃/	*õ */ɔ̃/
	*a */a/				

In addition, two diphthongs can be reconstructed, */wa/ and */ja/.

The following table shows the usual reflexes of the Proto-Cerrado nuclei in Proto-Goyaz Jê and in Proto-Akuwẽ. The latter group shows a chain vowel shift known as the Akuwẽ/Central Jê vowel shift.

Proto-Cerrado	Proto-Goyaz Jê	Proto-Akuwẽ
*a */a/	*a */a/, *ã */ã/ (before *-m’)	*a */a/
*ə */ɜ/	*ə */ɜ/	*e */ɛ/, *ê */e/ (before a dental coda)
*ə̂ */ɘ/	*ə̂ */ɘ/	*e */ɛ/, *ê */e/ (before a dental coda)
*y */ɨ/	*y */ɨ/, *ə */ɜ/ (after a velar onset), *ỹ */ɨ̃/ (before *-m’)	*ə */ə/
*o */ɔ/	*o */ɔ/	*o */ɔ/
*ô */o/	*ô */o/	*u */u/
*u */u/	*u */u/, *ũ */ũ/ (before *-m’)	*u */u/
*wa */wa/	*wa */wa/, *û */u^{a}/, *wə̂ */wɘ/ (in closed syllables)	*wa */wa/
*e */ɛ/	*e */ɛ/	*ê */e/
*ê */e/	*ê */e/	*i */i/
*i */i/	*i */i/	*i */i/
*ja */ja/	*jê */je/, *î */i^{a}/	*ĵa */ɟa/
*ə̃ */ɜ̃/	*ə̃ */ɜ̃/	*ə̃ */ə̃/
*ỹ */ɨ̃/	*ỹ */ɨ̃/	*ə̃ */ə̃/
*õ */ɔ̃/	*õ */ɔ̃/	*õ */ɔ̃/
*ẽ */ɛ̃/	*ẽ */ɛ̃/	*ẽ */ɛ̃/
*ĩ */ĩ/	*ĩ */ĩ/	*ĩ */ĩ/
