= Suya (disambiguation) =

Suya is a West African shish kebab dish.

Suya may also refer to:

- Suyá, an indigenous people of Brazil
- Suyá language, the language of the Suyá people
- Suyá music, the music of the Suyá people

== Places ==
- Suya, Benin, arrondissement and town in Benin

== People with the surname ==
- Flora Suya, Malawian actress
