= Tapajós languages =

Proposed subgroup of the Northern Jê languages

Tapajós
- Geographic distribution: Pará, Mato Grosso
- Linguistic classification: Macro-Jê: Jê; Cerrado; Jê of Goyaz; Northern Jê; Trans-Tocantins; Trans-Araguaia; Tapajós
- Subdivisions: Kĩsêdjê (Suyá); Tapayúna (Kajkwakhrattxi)

Language codes
- Glottolog: suya1243

The Tapajós (also called Suyá and Trans-Xingu) languages are a close-knit group of the Northern Jê languages, which comprises Kĩsêdjê and Tapayúna (Kajkwakhrattxi). It is closely related to Mẽbêngôkre (Kayapó); together, they make up the Trans-Araguaia branch of Northern Jê. Although both Tapajós languages are now spoken in the Xingu River basin rather than on the Tapajós, this is known to be a consequence of two independent eastbound demic movements. The Kĩsêdjê arrived in their current location around the Suiá-miçu River in the second half of the 19th century from the west; their migration route included the headwaters of the Manitsauá-miçu River, the Arraias River, and the Ronuro River (all of them are left tributaries of the Xingu). In contrast, the Tapayúna stayed in the Tapajós basin (in the Arinos region) until late 1960s, where they were decimated by the local rubber tappers and ranchers; the 41 survivors were transferred to the Xingu Indigenous Park in 1969.

== Phonology ==
=== Onsets ===
The Tapajós languages do not employ the feature [voice] for establishing contrasts between phonemes, as its ancestor Proto-Northern Jê did. At some point in the history of the Tapajós languages, Proto-Northern Jê voiceless stops became aspirated (with a subsequent change *pʰ > *h(ʷ)), and Proto-Northern Jê voiced stops were devoiced. In addition, the palatal stops were dentalized, whereas the original dentialveolar consonants acquired considerable retraction. The following table summarizes the defining innovations of the Tapajós group.

Proto-Northern Jê to Proto-Tapajós
Proto-Northern Jê	*p	*t	*c	*k	*b	*d	*ĵ	*g
pre-Proto-Tapajós	*pʰ	*t̠ʰ	*t̪ʰ	*kʰ	*p/*w	*t̠	*t̪	*k
Proto-Tapajós	*hʷ/*h (_V_{[+rnd]},*r)	*t̠ʰ	*t̪ʰ	*kʰ	*p/*w	*t̠	*t̪	*k
Kĩsêdjê	hw/h	th	s	kh	p/w	r/nd/t	t	k
Tapayúna	hw/h	th	t	kh	w	r	t	k

The following onsets can be reconstructed for Proto-Tapajós (the allophones which occur before nasal and oral nuclei respectively are separated by slashes).

Proto-Tapajós onsets
	labial	labial + rhotic	dental	(post)alveolar	palatal	velar	velar + rhotic	glottal	glottal + rhotic
plain stops	*/p/ (> K p, T w)		*/t̪/ (> K/T t)	*/t̠/ (> K r/nd/t, T r/t)		*/k/ (> K/T k)			
aspirated stops			*/t̪ʰ/ (> K s, T t)	*/t̠ʰ/ (> K/T th)		*/kʰ/ (> K/T kh)	*/kʰɾ/ (> K/T khr)		
prenasalized stop			*/ⁿt̪/ (> K nt, T nt ~ nd)						
nasal stops	*/m/ *[m]/*[mb] (> K m/mb, T w /w̃/)	*/mɾ/ *[mɾ]/*[mbɾ] (> K mr/mbr, T nr /ɾ̃/)		*/n/ *[n]/*[nd]) (> K/T n/nd)	*/ɲ/ *[ɲ]/*[ɲɟ] ~ *[j]) (> K/T nh/j)	*/ŋ/ *[ŋ]/*[ŋg]) (> K/T ng)	*/ŋɾ/ *[ŋɾ]/*[ŋgɾ]) (> K ngr, T ngr/nghr)		
sonorants	*/w/ *[w] (> K/T w)			*/ɾ/ *[ɾ] (> K/T r)				*/hʷ/ *[hʷ], *[h] (> K/T hw/h)	*/hʷɾ/ *[hɾ] (> K/T hr)
