= Tapayuna people =

Ethnic group in Brazil

Tapayuna
Total population
- 167 (2020)

Regions with significant populations
- Mato Grosso (Brazil)

Languages
- Tapayuna language

The Tapayuna (autonym: Kajkwakratxi), also known as Tapayúna, Western Suyá and Beiço-de-Pau are an Indigenous people in the state of Mato Grosso, Brazil. Their population was around 167 in 2020.

== Language ==
The Tapayuna speak the Tapayuna language, a Northern Jê language closely related and mutually intelligible with the Kĩsêdjê language.

== History ==
The Tapayuna historically lived on the Arinos River, in the Tapajós basin, between Juruena and Aripuanã. They were decimated in mid-20th century as a result of numerous conflicts with Brazilian settlers, rubber tappers, and ranchers; it is estimated that their population declined 90% until reaching 41 individuals in 1969, which has been characterized as an ethnocide. The surviving Tapayúna were then transferred to Xingu Indigenous Park at some point between 1969 and 1970, resulting in 10 more deaths. At first, they stayed with the Kĩsêdjê, speakers of a closely related language. Later, many Tapayúna moved to Terra Indígena Capoto-Jarina, where they went on to live with the Mẽtyktire subgroup of the Kayapó people, speakers of another Northern Jê language, Mẽbêngôkre.

== Society ==
The Tapayuna are generally monogamous; however, the pajé is allowed to marry two women. After marriage, a Tapayuna man must take up residence in his father-in-law's house.
