= Blown idiophone =

A blown idiophone is one of the categories of musical instruments found in the Hornbostel-Sachs system of musical instrument classification. These idiophones produce sound when stimulated by moving air. For example, the aeolsklavier features sticks while the piano chanteur features plaques.

This group is divided in the following two sub-categories (see: List of idiophones by Hornbostel–Sachs number):

- Blown sticks (141)
  - 141.1 Individual blown sticks.
  - 141.2 Sets of blown sticks.
    - Aeolsklavier
- Blown plaques (142)
  - 142.1 Individual blown plaques.
  - 142.2 Sets of blown plaques.
