= Linderhof Palace =

Building in Ettal, Bavaria, Germany

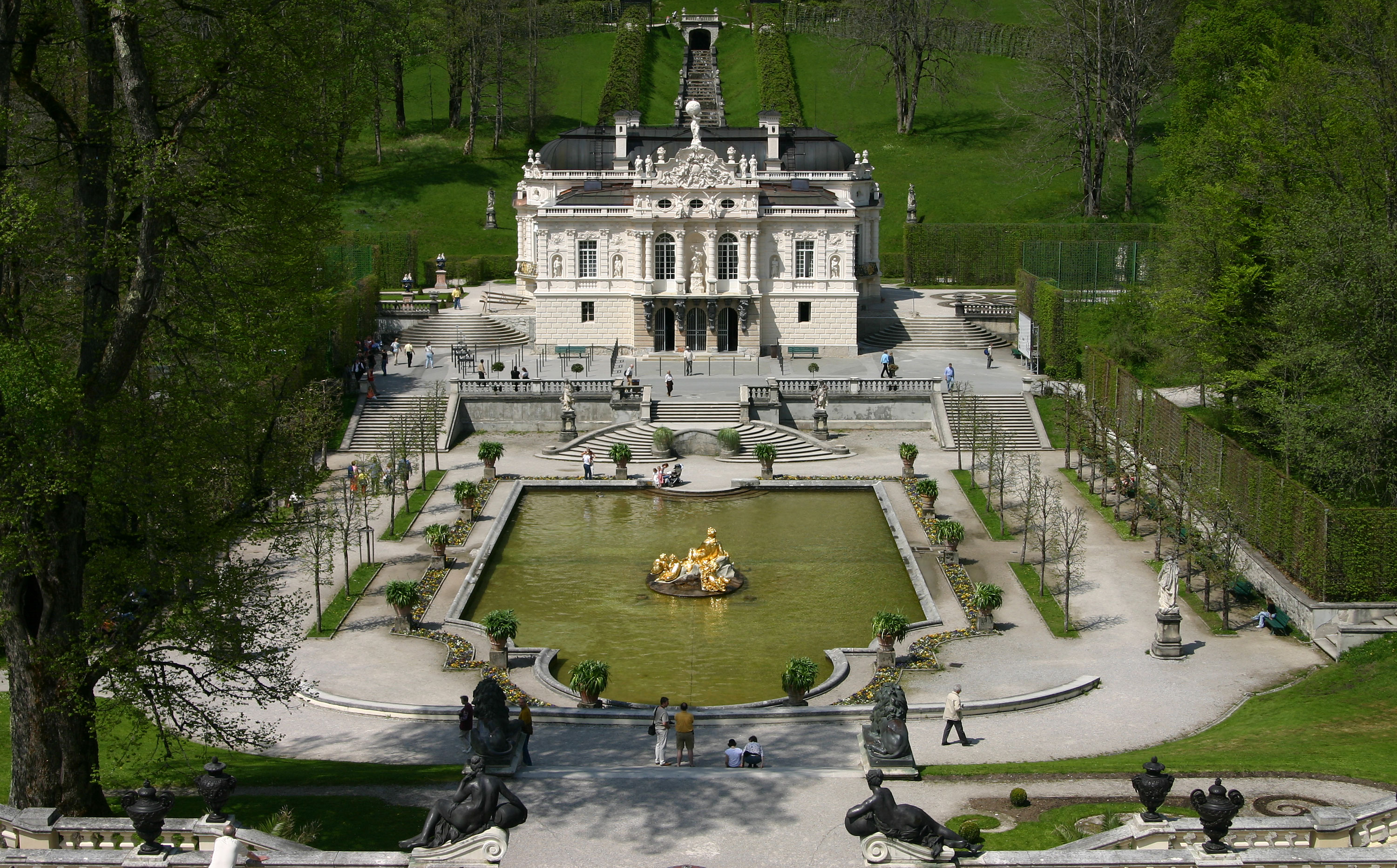

- Location within Germany

General information
- Location: Ettal, Germany
- Coordinates: 47.5716°N 10.9608°E

UNESCO World Heritage Site
- Part of: The Palaces of King Ludwig II of Bavaria: Neuschwanstein, Linderhof, Schachen and Herrenchiemsee
- Criteria: Cultural: iv
- Reference: 1726-002
- Inscription: 2025 (47th Session)
- Area: 57 ha (140 acres)
- Buffer zone: 4,507 ha (11,140 acres)

Linderhof Palace (German: Schloss Linderhof) is a schloss in Germany, 10 km west of the village of Ettal in southwest Bavaria. It is the smallest of the three palaces built by King Ludwig II of Bavaria, and the only one which was actually completed. He lived in the palace most of the time from 1876 onward.

== Development ==
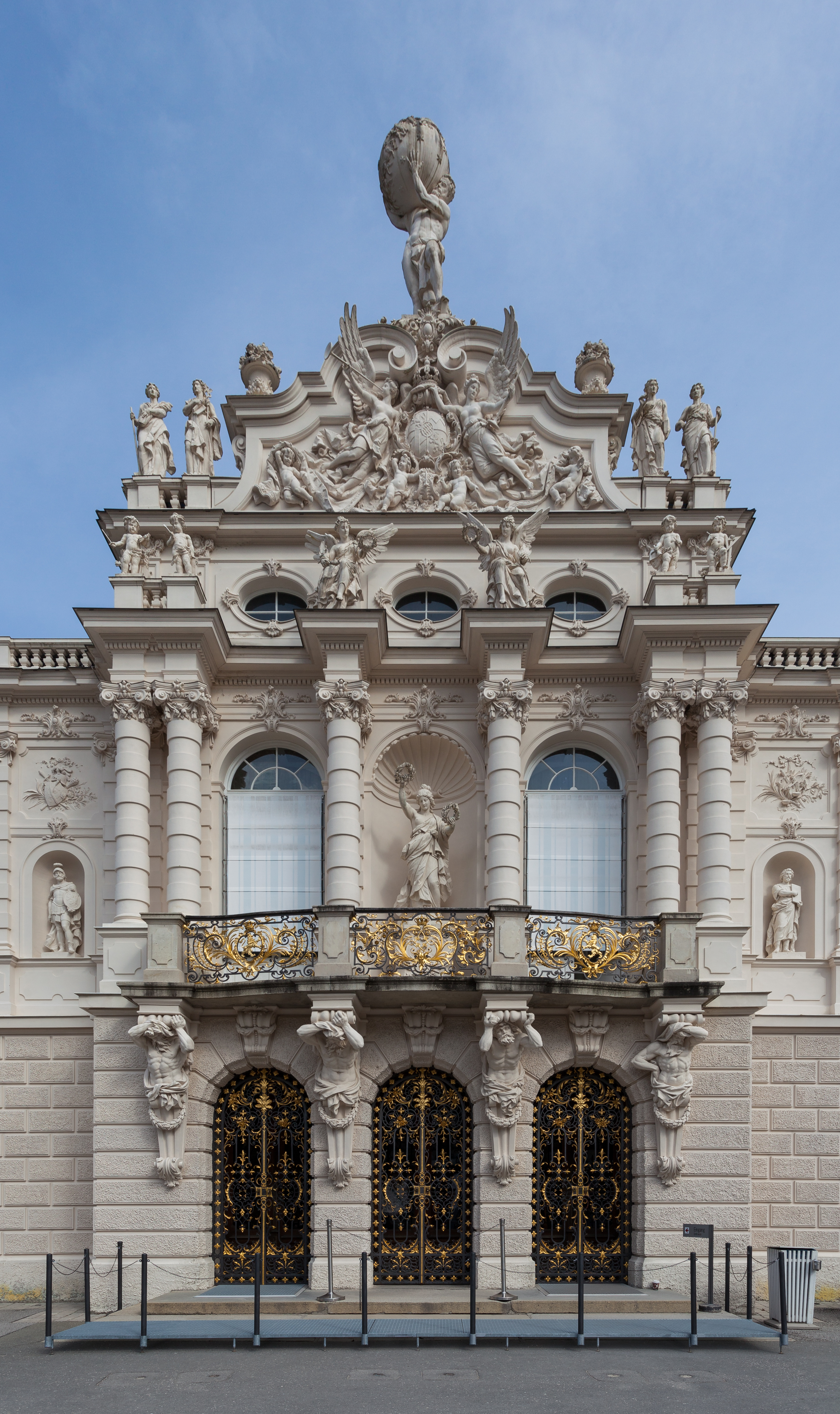
Stone façade

Ludwig already knew the area around Linderhof from his youth when he had accompanied his father King Maximilian II of Bavaria on his hunting trips in the Bavarian Alps. When Ludwig II became King in 1864, he inherited a hunting lodge, the so-called Königshäuschen ("King's little house") from his father, and in 1869 began enlarging the building. In 1874, he decided to tear down the Königshäuschen and rebuild it in its present-day location in the park. At the same time three new rooms and the staircase were added to the remaining U-shaped complex, and the previous wooden exterior was clad with stone façades. The building was designed in the style of the second rococo-period. Between 1863 and 1886, a total of 8,460,937 marks was spent constructing Linderhof.

In 2025, the palace was designated as a World Heritage Site by UNESCO.

== Symbolic background ==
Although Linderhof is dramatically smaller than the Palace of Versailles, it is evident that the palace of the French Sun-King Louis XIV (who was an idol for Ludwig) was its inspiration. The staircase, for example, is a reduction of the famous Ambassador's staircase in Versailles, which would be copied in full in Herrenchiemsee, another palace project by Ludwig that was designed less as a residential building than as a homage to the Sun King.

Stylistically, however, the building and its decor take their cues from the mid-18th century Rococo of Louis XV, and the small palace in the Graswang valley was more directly based on that king's Petit Trianon on the Versailles grounds. The symbol of the sun that can be found everywhere in the decoration of the rooms represents the French notion of absolutism that, for Ludwig, was the perfect incorporation of his ideal of a God-given monarchy with total royal power. However, such a monarchy could no longer be realised in Europe in the second half of the nineteenth century. In the Kingdom of Bavaria, the monarch was severely restricted by the country's constitution, and Ludwig's incompetence and disinterest in really taking care of state affairs and political power struggles further prevented him from acting as an absolute ruler.

Especially the bedroom was important to the ceremonial life of an absolute monarch; Louis XIV of France used to give his first (lever) and last audience (coucher) of the day in his bedchamber. In imitation of Versailles, the bedroom is the largest chamber of Linderhof Palace. By facing north, however, the Linderhof bedroom inverts the symbolism of its Versailles counterpart, showing Ludwig's self-image as a "Night-King", because he had gotten into the habit of turning night into day and vice versa. The reclusive monarch naturally never intended to live surrounded by thousands of people in a vast palace, rising and going to bed in the presence of dozens of dignitaries like the Sun King. Yet he revered the latter (and envied his unlimited power), which is why allusions to him can be found in numerous other details. For example, the ceiling of the dining room depicts scenes from life at the court of Versailles, and the horseshoe-shaped cabinets are decorated with portraits of French courtiers and noblemen (including Madame de Pompadour, the mistress of Louis XV).

== The rooms ==
Linderhof, in comparison to other palaces, has a rather private atmosphere. In fact, there are only four rooms that have a real function.

=== Hall of Mirrors ===
This room was used by the king as a drawing room; he enjoyed sitting in the niche, sometimes reading there the whole night. Because Ludwig II used to sleep in the daytime and stay awake in the night, the mirrors created an effect for him when they reflected the light of the candles. The parallel placement of some mirrors evoke the illusion of a never ending avenue.

Appointments:

The middle table has a top with lapis lazuli, amethyst and chalcedony inlay work and shows the Bavarian coat of arms in glass mosaic.

A carpet made of ostrich plumes.

An Indian ivory candelabra in the alcove with 16 branches.

Two mantelpieces clad with lapis-lazuli and decorated with gilded bronze ornaments.

=== Eastern and Western Tapestry Chambers ===
The two tapestry chambers are almost identical and have no specific function. The western one is sometimes called "Music Room" because of the aeolodion (an instrument combining piano and harmonium) in it. Only the curtains and the coverings on the furniture are real products of the Parisian Gobelin Manufactory. The scenes on the walls are painted on rough canvas in order to imitate real tapestries.

=== Audience Chamber ===
The audience chamber is located to the west of the palace and is flanked by the yellow and lilac cabinets. The cabinets were only used as antechambers to the larger rooms. Ludwig II never used this room to hold an audience. This would have been against the private character of Linderhof and the chamber would have been much too small for it. He rather used it as a study where he thought about new building projects. That there is an audience chamber in Linderhof, however, points to the demand of the king in an absolute monarchy.

Appointments:

Two round tables with malachite tops, gift of Grand Duchess Maria Alexandrovna of Russia to King Ludwig II.

Throne baldachin with ostrich feather bunches (as an oriental symbol of royal power).

=== Dining Room ===
This room is located to the east and is flanked by the pink and blue cabinets. The pink cabinet, unlike the other cabinets, had a real function. The king used it as a robing room. The dining room is famous for its disappearing dumb-waiter called "Tischlein deck dich". The table disappeared on a lifting platform into the kitchen on the lower floor, where it was set with the next course and brought up again. This mechanism was installed so that Ludwig could dine alone here without being disturbed by servants. Yet the staff had to lay the table for at least four persons because it is said that the king used to talk to imaginary people like Louis XV, Mme de Pompadour, or Marie Antoinette while he was eating. For Ludwig II enjoyed the imagined company of those people and admired them. You can find portraits of them in the cabinets, and scenes of their lives everywhere in the palace's rooms. Here, too, a strong contrast emerges between idol and imitator: While Ludwig even shunned the presence of servants, the Sun King used to dine with his wife and brother at a table, while dozens of select court dignitaries had the honor of watching, lined up along the walls.

Appointments:

Meissen porcelain centrepiece with china flowers.

=== Bedchamber ===
The model for this room was not Louis XIV's bedchamber in Versailles but the bedroom of the Rich Rooms in Munich Residence. As in Versailles or the Munich Residence, one finds a separation of the bed part from the rest of the room, which would allow the first or last audience of the day (the so-called Lever and Coucher) to be held at the bed, as the Sun King did. Only, during his daily ceremony of rising, Louis XIV was surrounded by at least 50 high-ranking spectators, while this number would hardly have fit into the small bedroom in Linderhof.

The position of the bed itself on steps in the alcove that is closed off by a gilded balustrade, like the baroque Munich model, gives it the appearance of an altar and thereby glorifies Ludwig II as he slept during the day. He often also spent the night waking and reading in this room, which was illuminated by numerous candles, among other a glass candelabra with 108 candles. The king was very well read about the legends and mythologies of the Middle Ages as well as about court life and the arts in the era of Louis XIV.

The two console tables are of Meissen porcelain (which was the king's favorite china). This room was completely rebuilt in 1884 and could not be totally finished until the king's death two years later.

=== Gallery ===
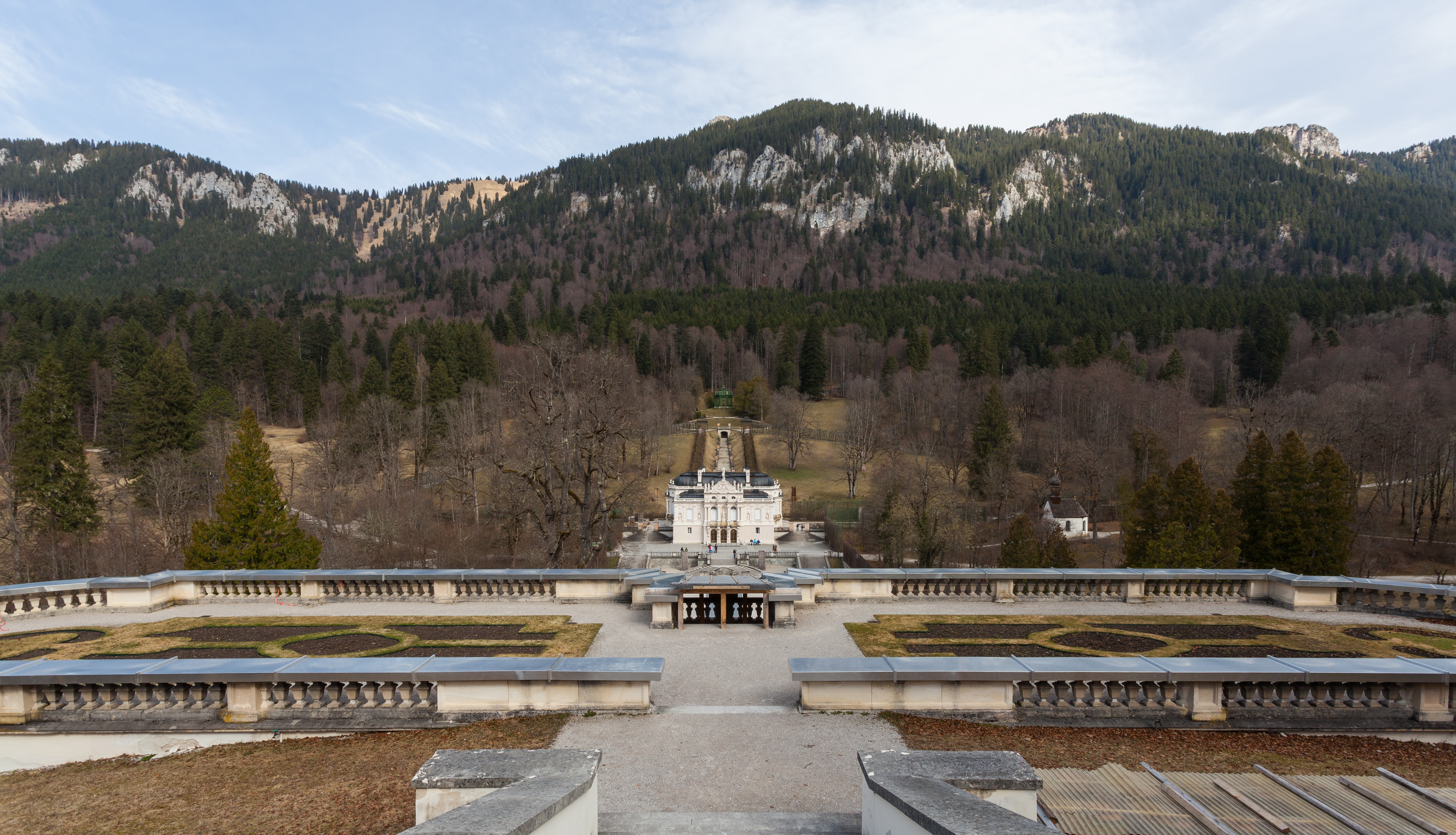
Palace from the Baroque parterre garden

Video of the fountain

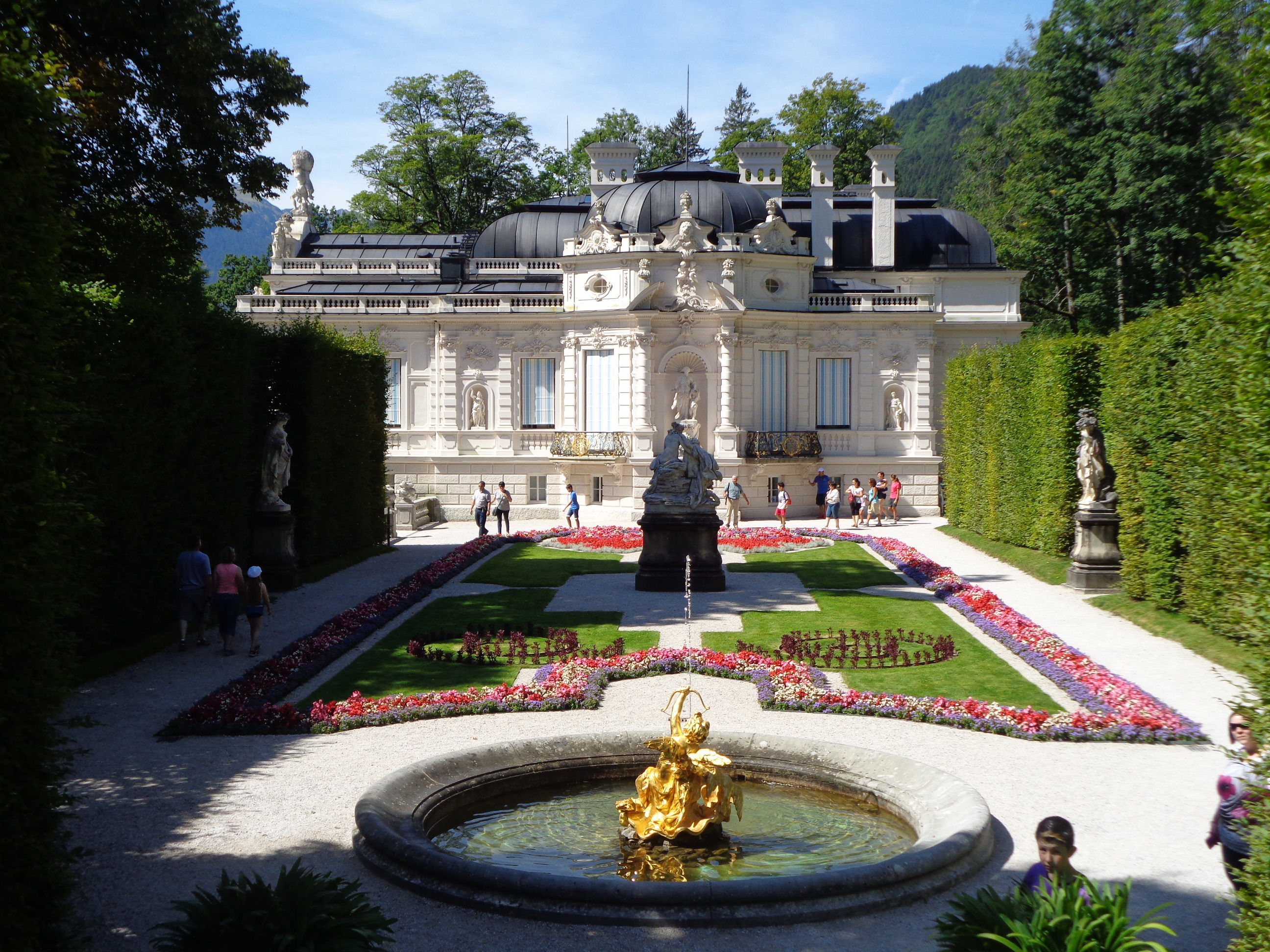
East view with the Eastern parterre garden

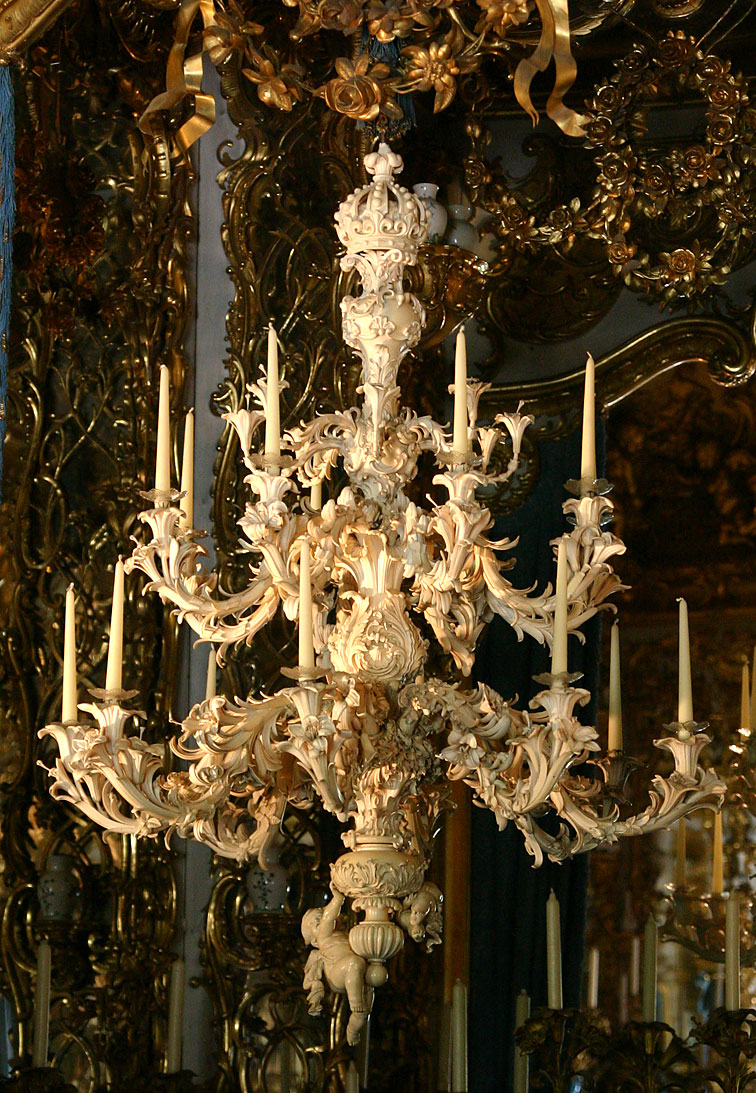
Porcelain chandelier

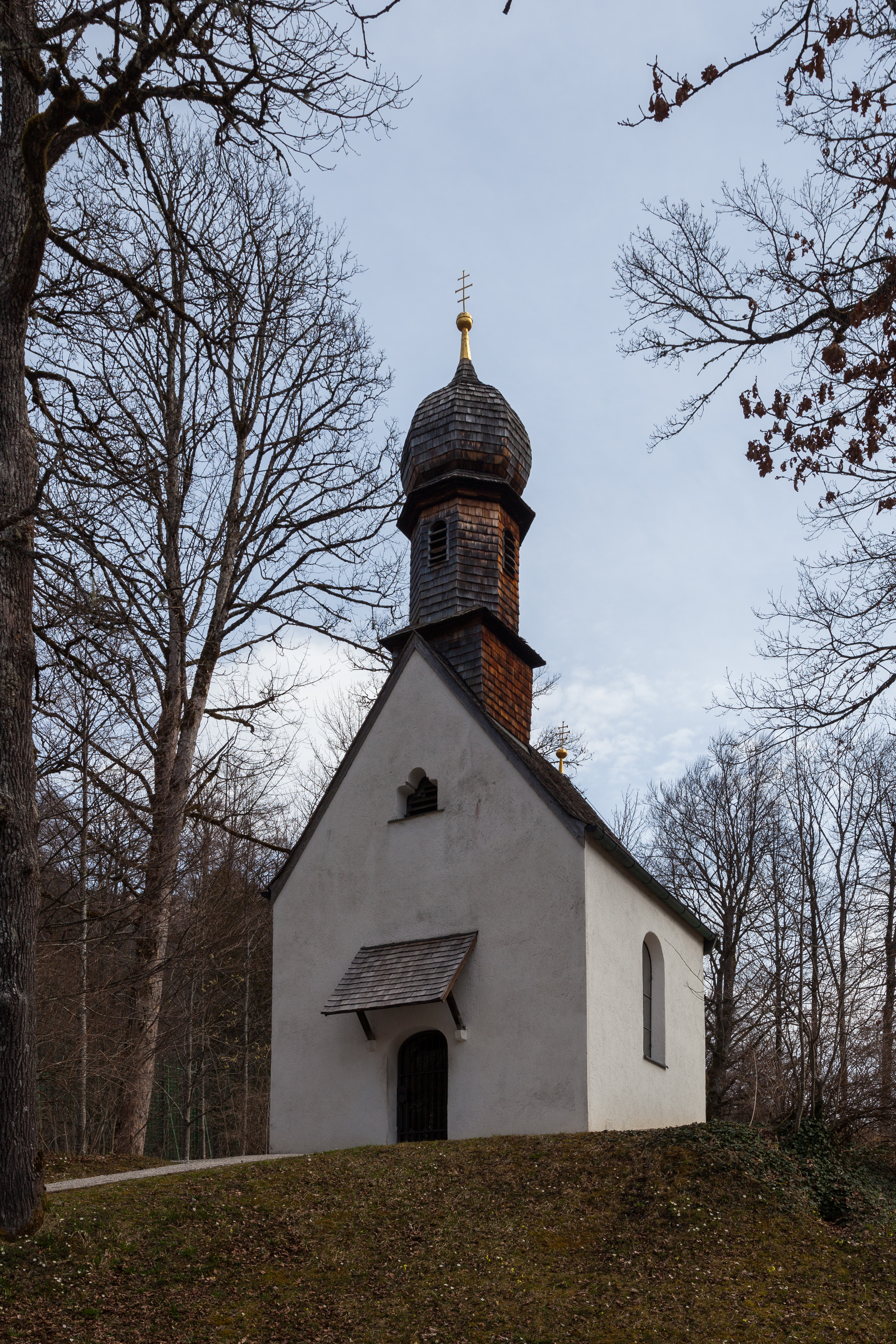
Chapel of St. Anne in the park

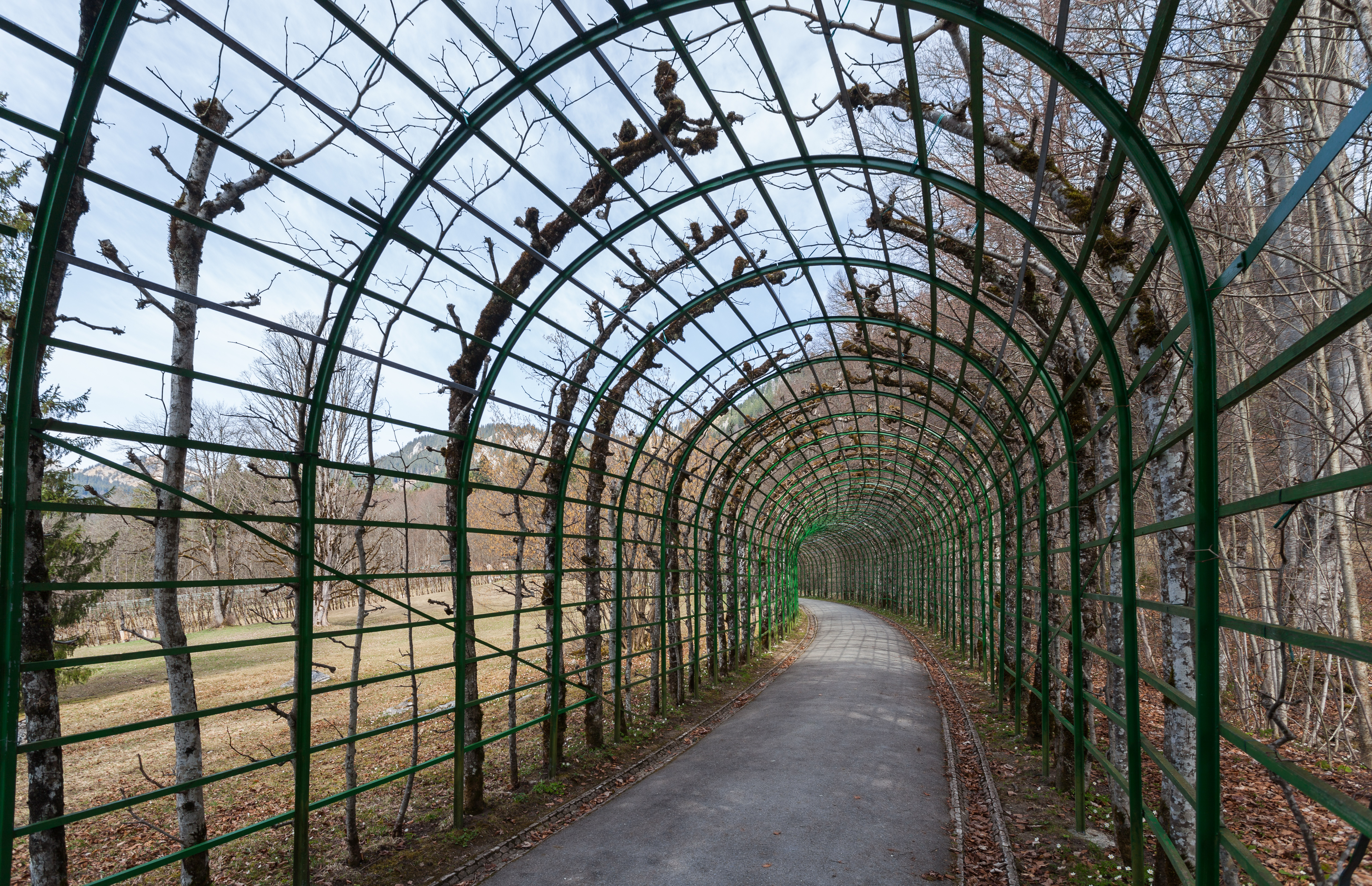
Passage in the park

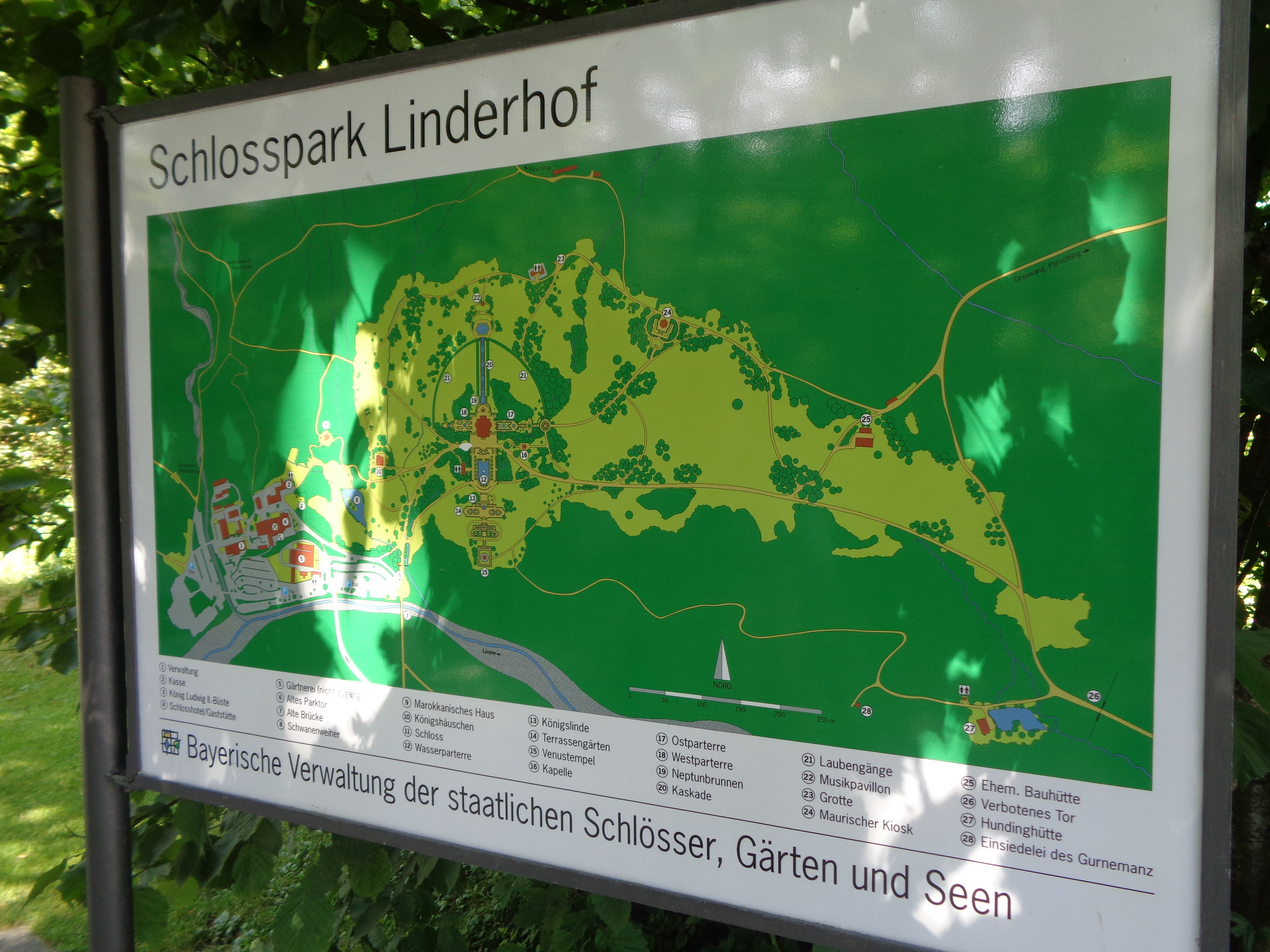
Information board in the surrounding park

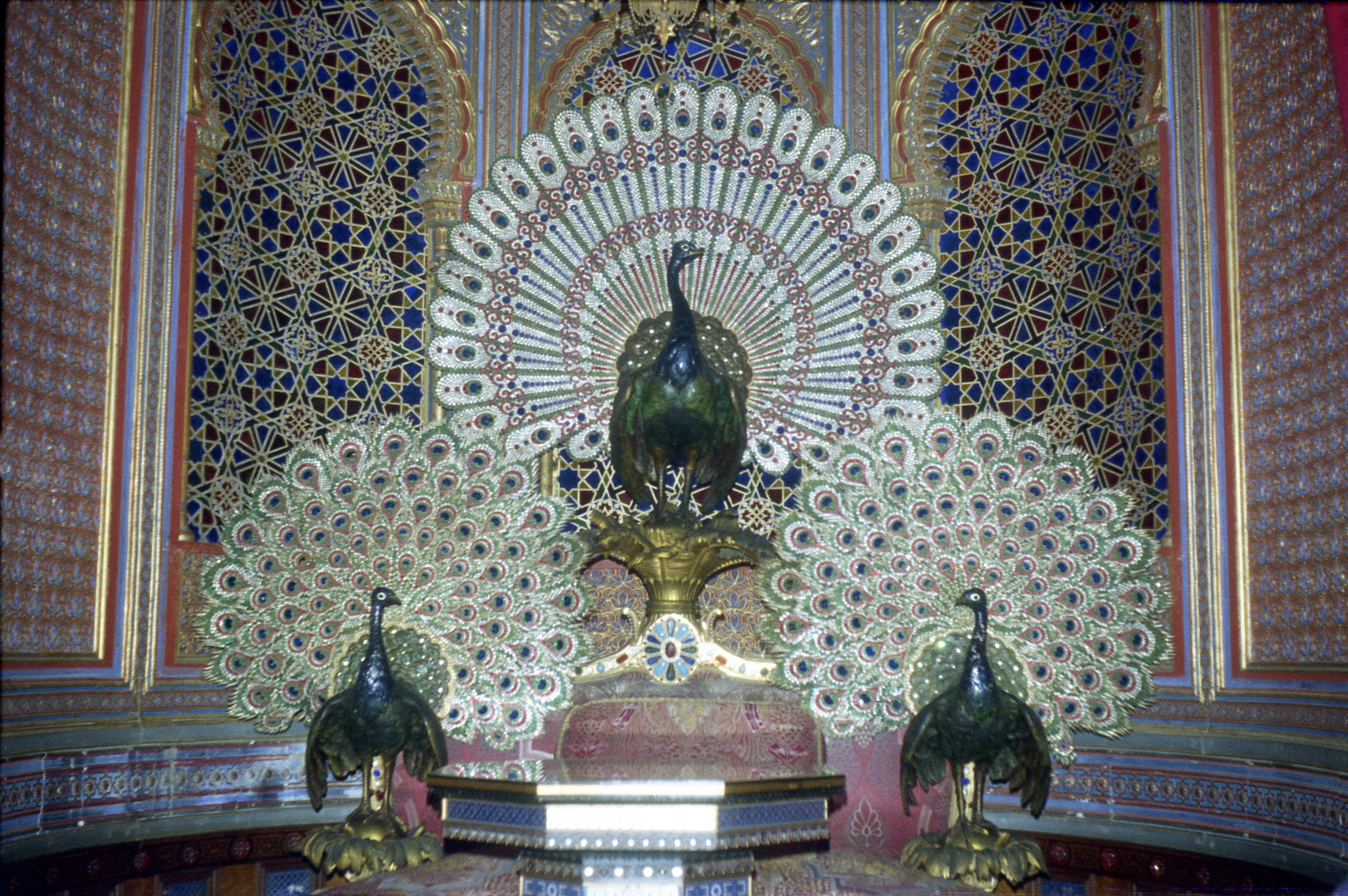
Ludwig's Peacock throne in the Moorish Kiosk

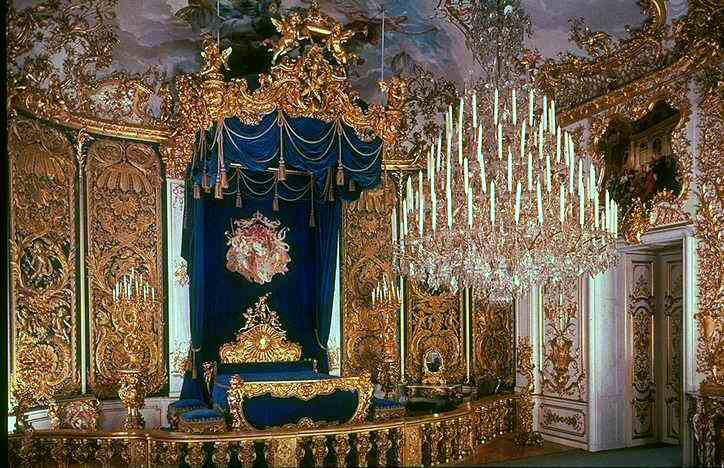
The king's bedchamber

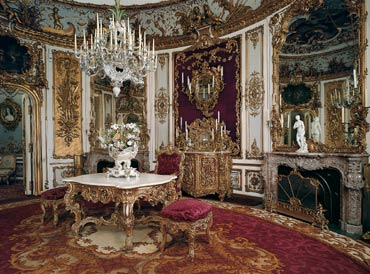
Dining room

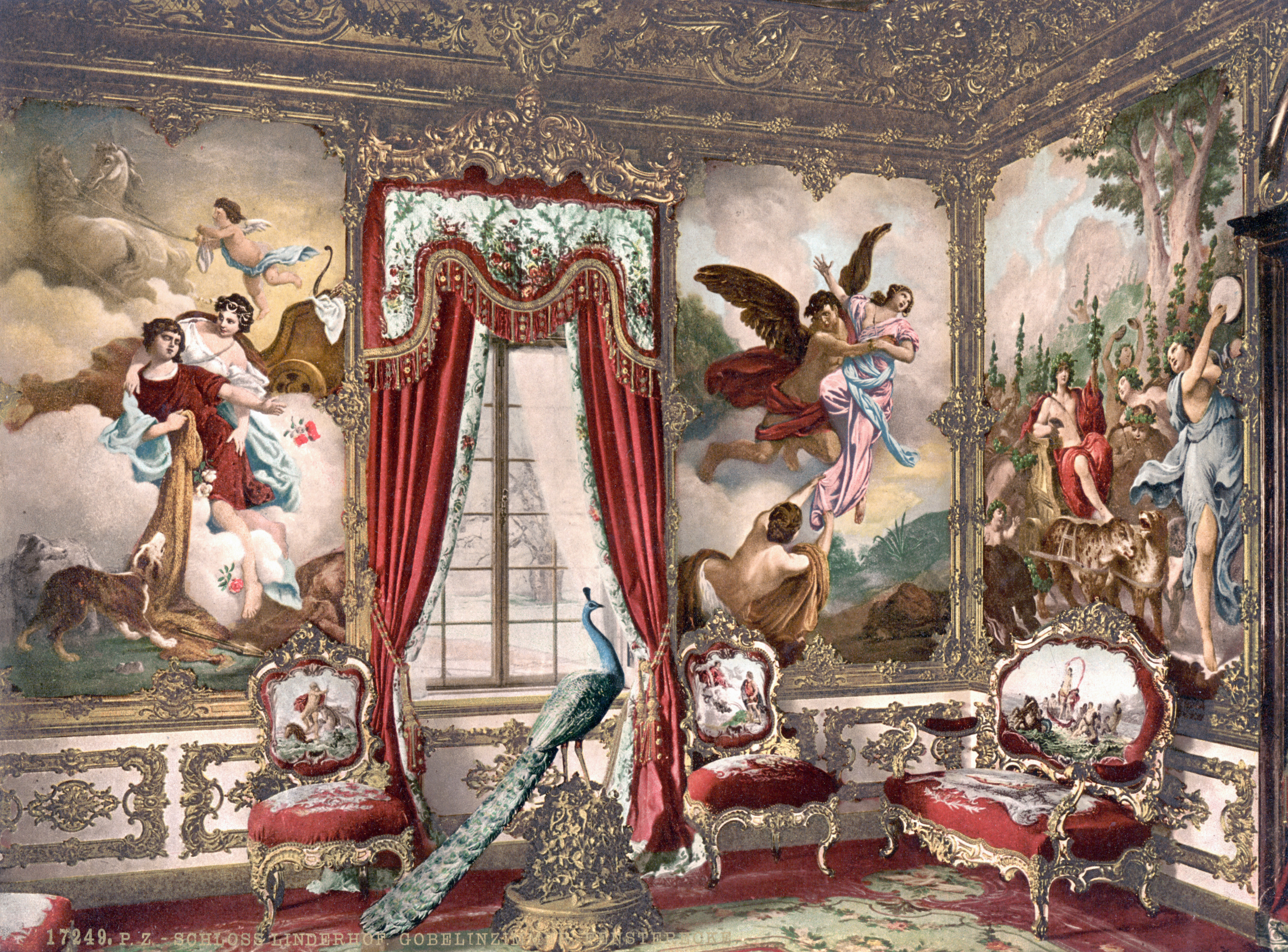
Eastern tapestry room with painted imitation tapestries

== The park ==
The gardens surrounding Linderhof Palace are considered one of the most beautiful creations of historicist garden design, designed by Court Garden Director Carl von Effner. The park combines elements of Renaissance and Baroque formal gardens with landscaped sections that are similar to the English landscape garden.

=== Linderhof's Linden or The Old "Königslinde" ===
Deriving from the romantic image of animated nature Ludwig was fascinated by trees. For this reason a tall, 300-year-old linden tree was allowed to remain in the formal gardens although disturbing its symmetry. Historic pictures show a seat in it, where Ludwig used to take his "breakfast" at sunset hidden from view amongst the branches. Contrary to common understanding the tree did not give the palace its name. It came from a family called "Linder" that used to cultivate the farm (in German "Hof" = farm) that over centuries had been in the place where now Linderhof palace is.

=== Formal gardens ===
The palace is surrounded by formal gardens that are subdivided into five sections that are decorated with allegoric sculptures of the continents, the seasons and the elements:

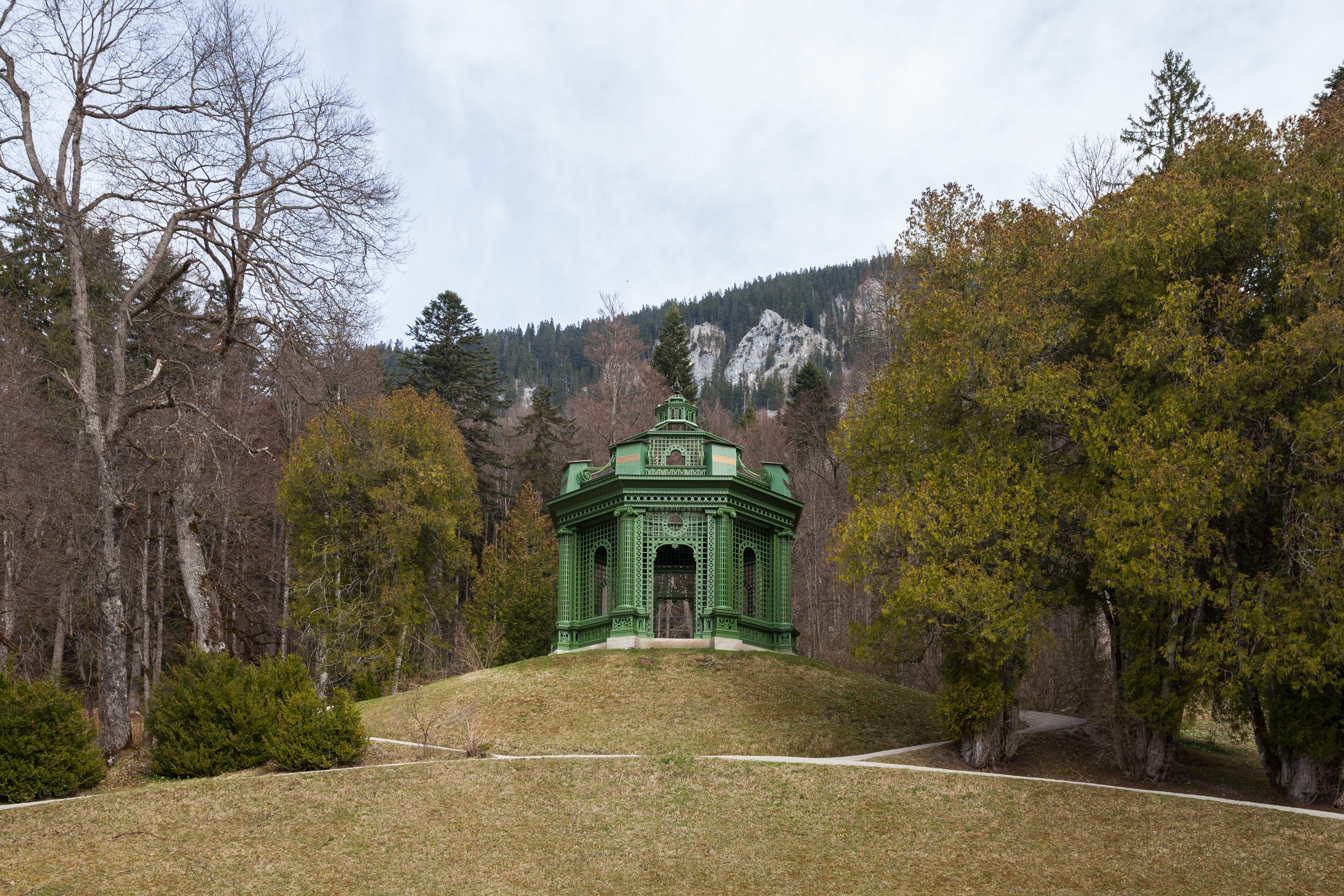
Music Pavilion

The northern part is characterized by a cascade of thirty marble steps. The bottom end of the cascade is formed by the Neptune fountain and at the top there is a Music Pavilion.

The centre of the western parterre is formed by basin with the gilt figure of "Fama". In the west there is a pavilion with the bust of Louis XIV. In front of it you see a fountain with the gilt sculpture "Amor with dolphins". The garden is decorated with four majolica vases.

The crowning of the eastern parterre is a wooden pavilion containing the bust of Louis XVI. Twenty-four steps below it there is a fountain basin with a gilt sculpture "Amor shooting an arrow". A sculpture of "Venus and Adonis" is placed between the basin and the palace.

The water parterre in front of the palace is dominated by a large basin with the gilt fountain group "Flora and puttos". The fountain's water jet itself is nearly 25 meters high.

The terrace gardens form the southern part of the park and correspond to the cascade in the north. On the landing of the first flight there is the "Naiad fountain" consisting of three basins and the sculptures of water nymphs. In the middle arch of the niche you see the bust of Marie Antoinette of France. These gardens are crowned by a round temple with a statue of Venus formed after a painting by Antoine Watteau (The Embarkation for Cythera).

=== Landscape garden and structures in the park ===
The landscape garden covers an area of about 50 hectares (125 acres) and is perfectly integrated in the surrounding natural alpine landscape. There are several buildings of different appearance located in the park.

Venus Grotto

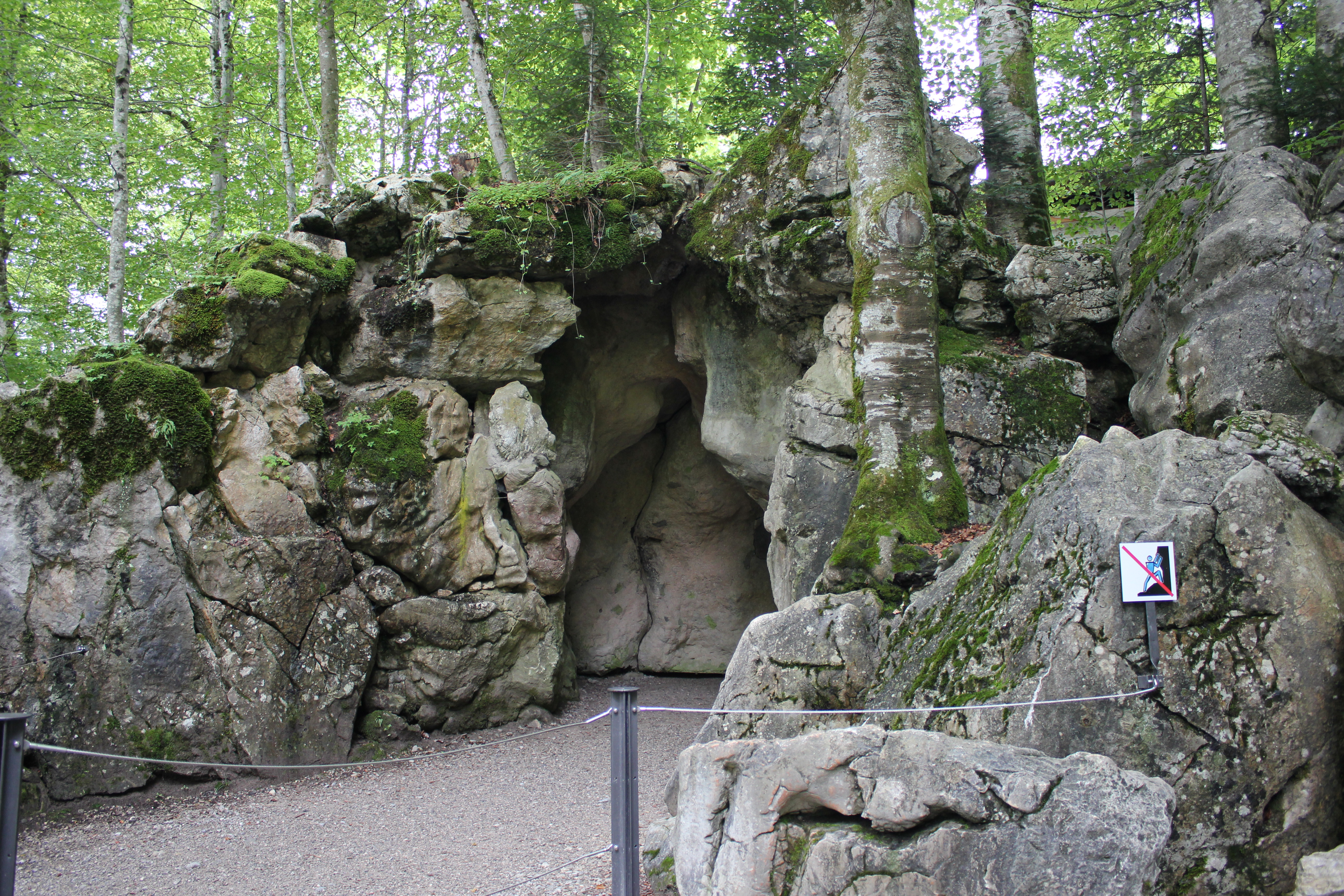
Entrance to the grotto

The building is hidden under an artificial hill with a rock entrance. It is wholly artificial and was built for the king as an illustration of the First Act of Wagner's Tannhäuser. At the beginning of the first act, Tannhäuser is in the cave of Venusberg. In keeping with the theme, the painting by August von Heckel in the background of the main grotto depicts “Tannhäuser with Frau Venus”.

The grotto was built under the direction of the opera set designer August Dirigl between 1875 and 1877. It is an iron construction whose partition walls were covered with impregnated canvas, which in turn was sprayed with a cement mixture from which the artificially created stalactites are made. The grotto is divided into two side grottos and a main grotto. In artificial caves in the "rock walls" there are two seats from which the king could follow musical performances: the gold plated "shell throne" and a "crystal throne" on the "Loreley Rock", from which one gazes into a mirror in which the dream world continues indefinitely. Depending on the lighting, the king could thus immerse himself in the respective scenes of the opera. The crystal prisms surrounding the seat had been illuminated from below with electric light bulbs since their manufacture in 1877, so that their prism-like glow reflected rainbow colors on the walls. The holders for the series-connected batteries have been preserved to this day. This is all the more remarkable because the patent for light bulbs was not granted until years later, in 1880.

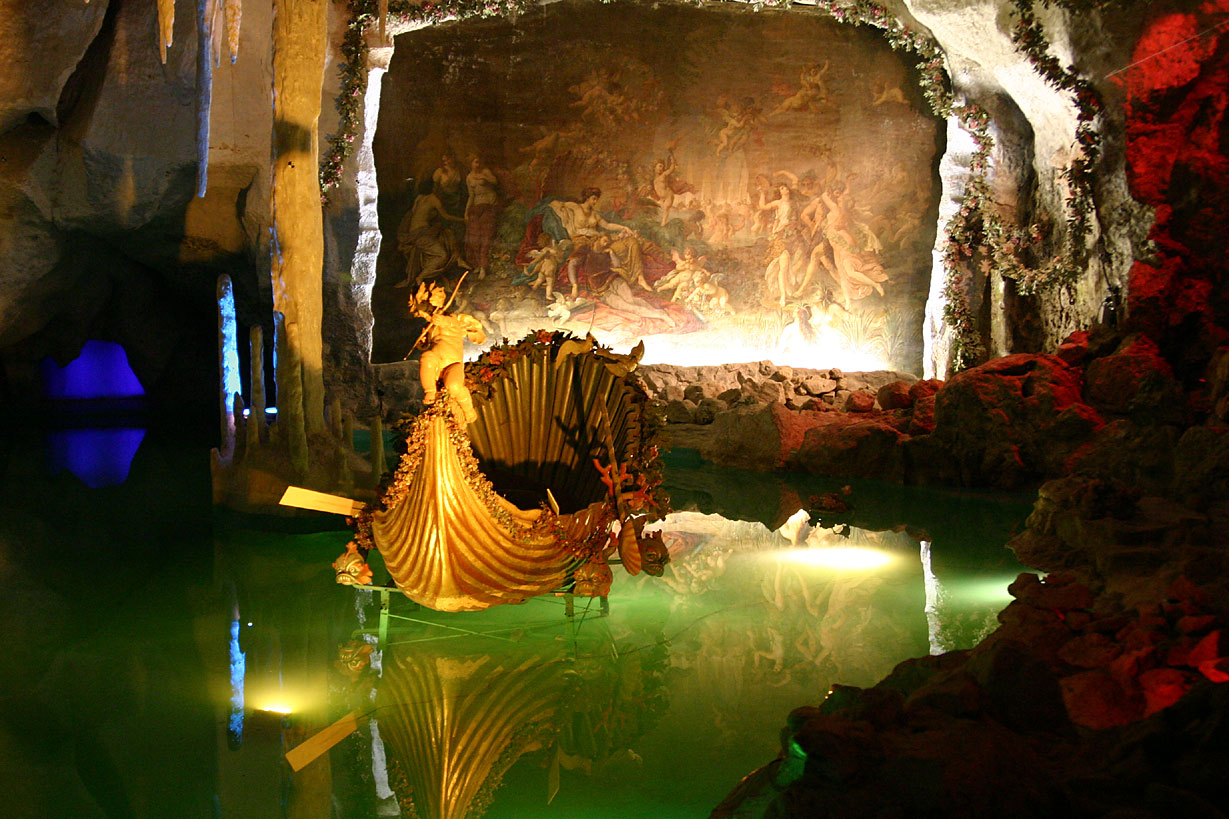
Venus Grotto

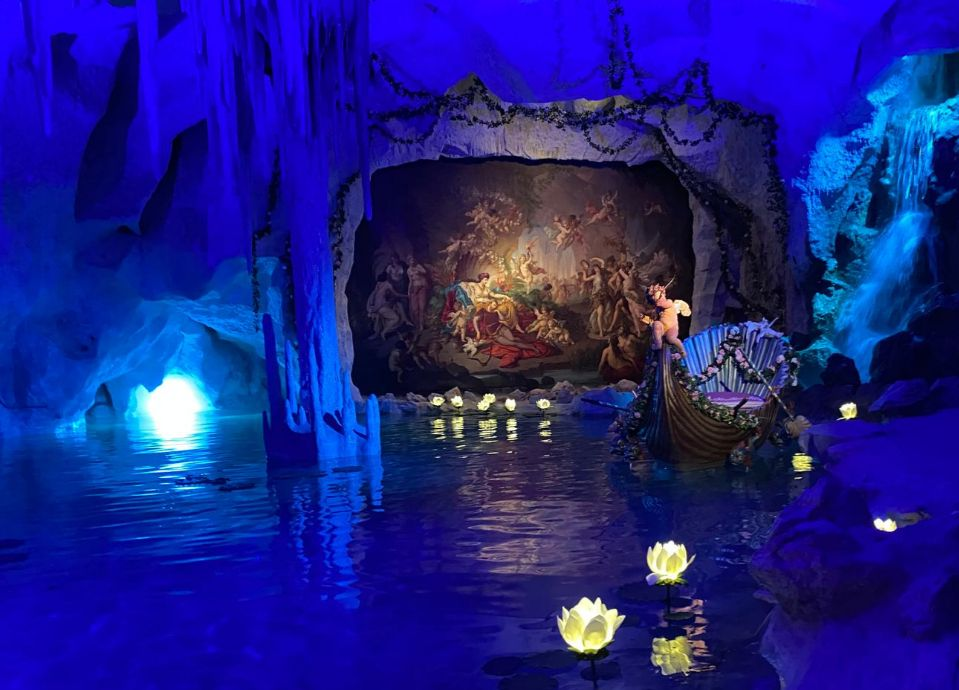
The blue effect of the grotto lighting (2025)

Seven stoves were needed to heat the damp and cool rooms several days in advance, even in summer. A waterfall and a shell-shaped barge were custom-made for use in the grotto. A rainbow projection device and a wave machine completed the illusion as the king was rowed around on the artificial lake while musicians played motifs from Tannhäuser. At the same time he wanted his own blue grotto of Capri. Therefore, 24 dynamo generators powered by a steam engine, had been installed by Johann Sigmund Schuckert in 1878 and so already in the time of Ludwig II it was possible to illuminate the grotto with arc lamps in changing colours. This is said to have not only been the first Bavarian electricity plant but the first permanently installed power plant in the world. The king's desire for a “bluer blu” spurred the then young paint industry and, four years after Ludwig's death, the Baden Aniline and Soda Factory (BASF) received a patent from the Imperial Patent Office for the production of artificial indigo dye. The power plant, the light bulbs with batteries, the projection devices and the artificial blue represented technical innovations of unprecedented novelty, no opera house at that time could boast anything comparable. Indeed, the requirements and orders that the king set for the furnishing of his grotto led to remarkable technological advances. He wasn't interested in the technologies used; he wanted to achieve specific, precise effects – and it was up to engineers to invent them for him.

These installations are somewhat reminiscent of Ludwig's bedroom at Hohenschwangau Castle, into which he had a group of artificial rocks built in 1864, over which a waterfall flowed, as well as an apparatus for producing an artificial rainbow and a night sky with the moon and stars, illuminated by a complicated system of mirrors from the upper floor. The creation of perfect illusions through the use of cutting-edge technologies actually makes the “fairytale king” appear more in tune with modernity and more open to the achievements of the Industrial Revolution than his backward-looking image would suggest.

The grotto was entirely renovated from 2024 until 2025, as the moisture-sensitive construction on a mountain slope was significantly damaged by rain and meltwater. The entire restoration process involved around 500,000 working hours and 58.9 million euros.

Hunding's Hut

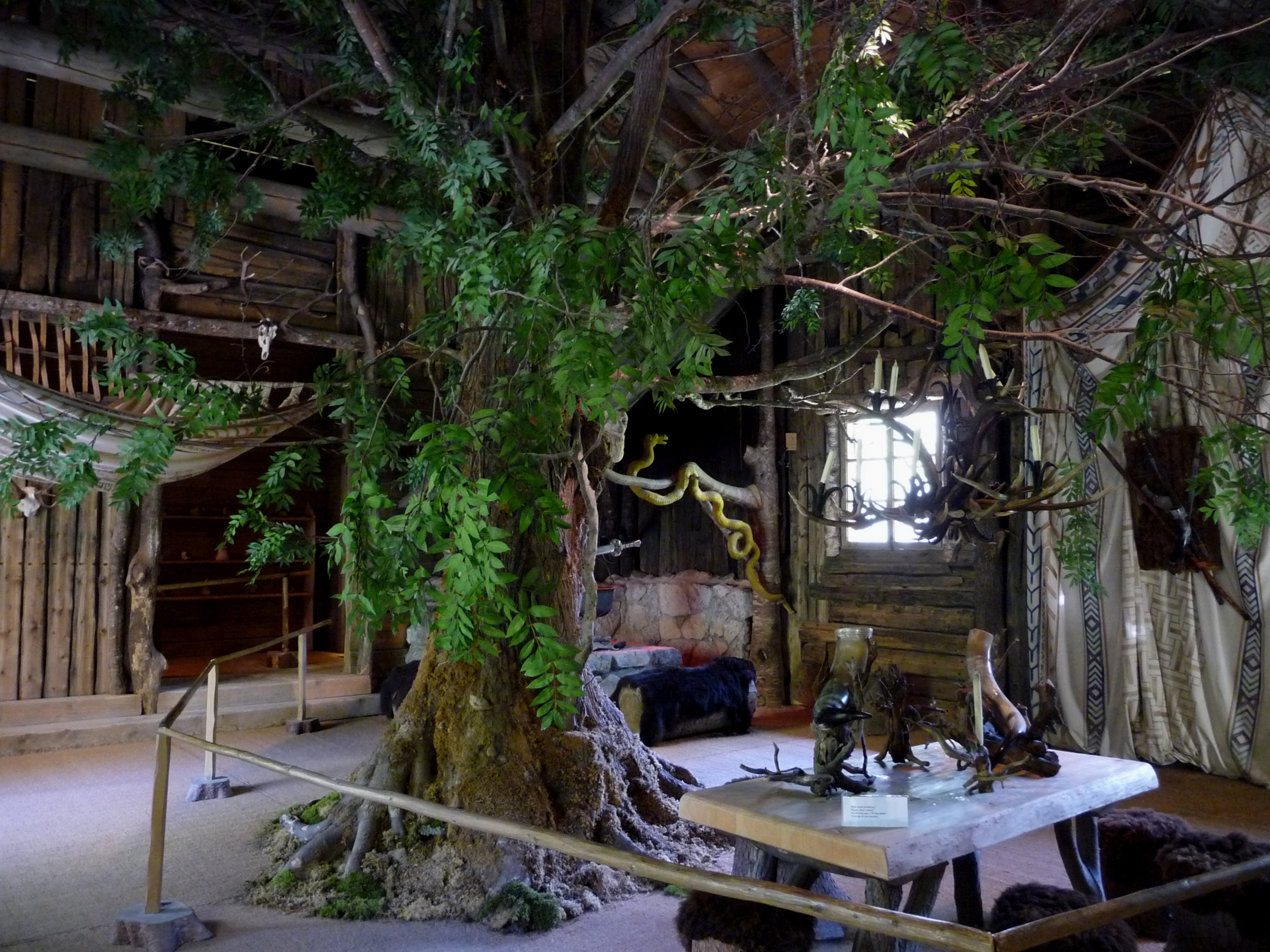
Interior of Hunding's Hut

From the outside, a simple wooden house with walls made of uniform, peeled tree trunks, the interior was inspired by Richard Wagner's directions for the First Act of the Die Walküre and a corresponding stage design by Josef Hoffman from 1876. There is an ash tree in the middle of the interior representing the one from which Sigmund pulls the magical sword Nothung in the opera.

In 1884 the hut burned down, but was immediately rebuilt. In 1945 it fell victim to the flames again due to arson, although some of the furniture and furnishings were preserved. In the summer of 1990, Hunding's Hut was rebuilt at a new location closer to the palace. A reconstruction at the original location could not be carried out for reasons of nature conservation.

Ludwig used to celebrate Germanic feasts in Hunding's Hut. In his 1972 Ludwig film epic, the director Luchino Visconti shot naked or half-clothed farm boys hanging lazily on the branches in the hut (in a film studio in Rome). The censors cut these and other scenes from the first version.

Gurnemanz' Hermitage

The small wooden building is inspired by Wagner's opera Parsifal, where in the Third Act Gurnemanz, a knight of the Holy Grail, is living alone as a hermit in the forest. After many years of wandering, Parsifal suddenly appears here on Good Friday carrying the lost Holy Lance. Kundry recognizes him as the pure fool, now enlightened by compassion and freed from guilt through purifying suffering, and believes him to be the forever new king of the knights of the Grail, as which he is then proclaimed by the dying king Amfortas and the knights.

Aside from his magnificent palaces, the king owned a number of modest Alpine huts. He visited these regularly in a fixed annual cycle in spring and autumn. The most famous is the King's House on Schachen, where he spent his birthday every August. Good Fridays he used to spend in the Ammergau Alps forest contemplating. For this purpose, he had Gurnemanz' Hermitage, an imaginary hermit's hut built in a forest clearing there in 1877. In order to reflect the uplifting mood of the third act, the king really wanted to have a flower meadow around the hut on Good Friday. If there was no such meadow because there was still snow lying, the garden director had to plant one for the king. He reported about the hermitage to Wagner in a letter and wrote: "There on the consecrated site I can already hear the silver trumpets from the Grail's Castle..." The original hermitage with its bell tower fell into disrepair in the 1960s. In 1999/2000, private donations made it possible to reconstruct the Gurnemanz hermitage for Linderhof. The replica was placed only about 150 meters west of the new Hunding's Hut.

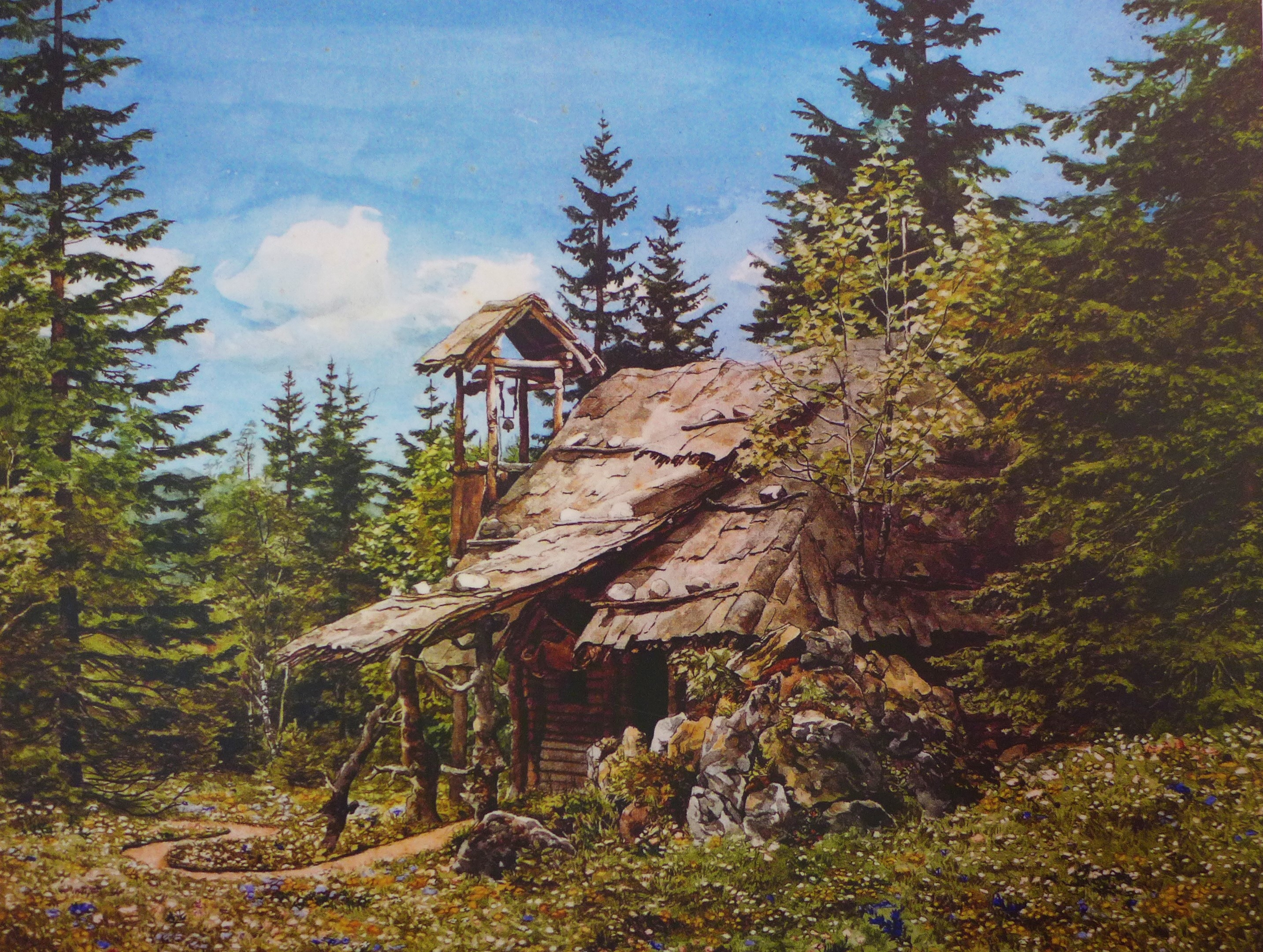
Gurnemanz' Hermitage in the Ammer Forest (watercolor by Heinrich Breling, 1882)

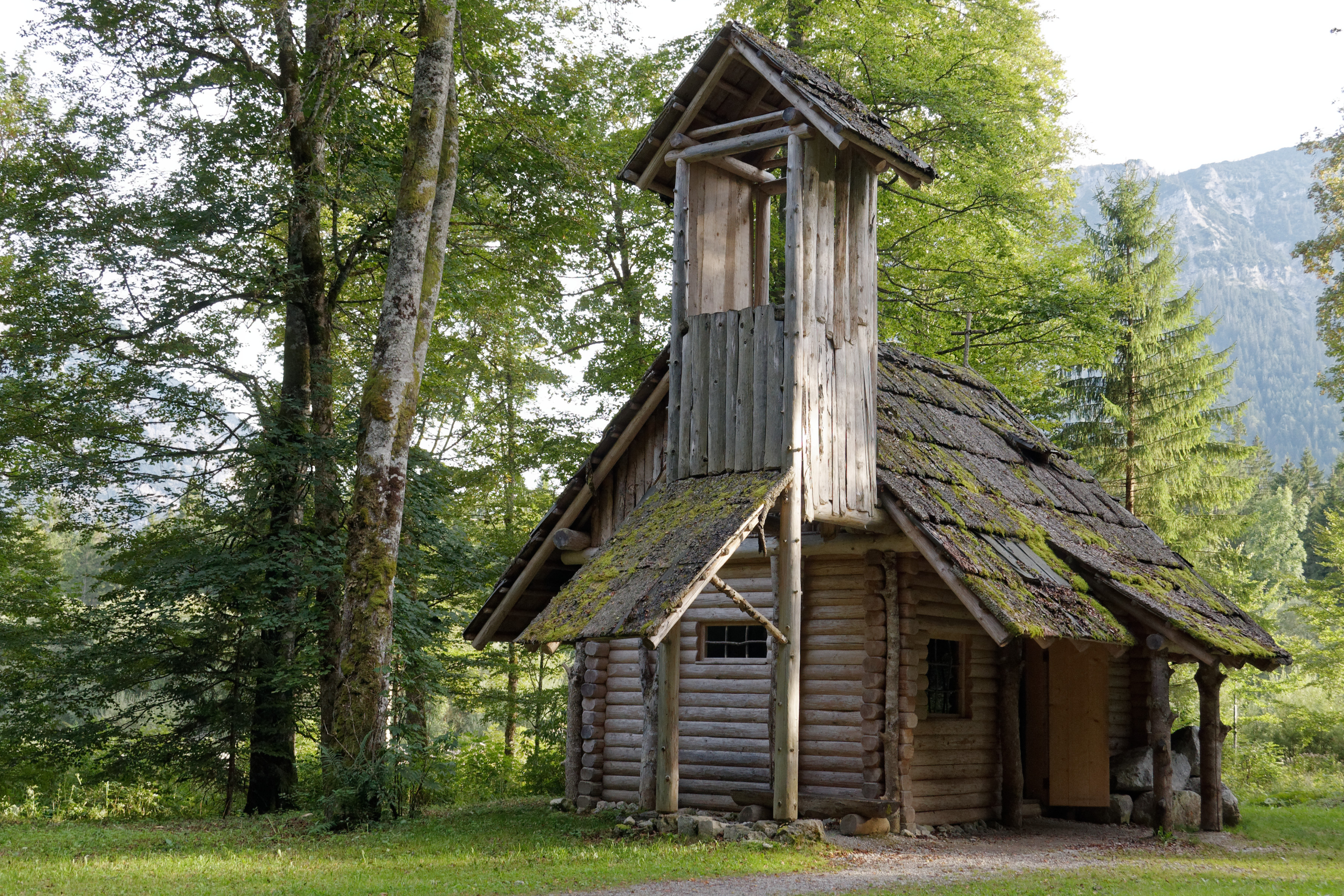
The reconstructed structure at Linderhof

The three structures, the "Venus Grotto", "Hunding's Hut" and "Gurnemanz Hermitage" are reminiscent of the operas of Richard Wagner. But besides that and the baroque architecture of French kings Louis XIV and Louis XV, Ludwig was also interested in the oriental world.

Moorish Kiosk

This building was designed by the Berliner architect Karl von Diebitsch for the International Exhibition in Paris 1867. Ludwig II wanted to buy it but was forestalled by the railroad king Bethel Henry Strousberg. Ludwig bought the pavilion after the bankruptcy of Strousberg. He had the furnishings made. The most notable piece of furniture is the peacock throne, a modern interpretation of the lost Peacock Throne of the emperors of the Mughal Empire in India.

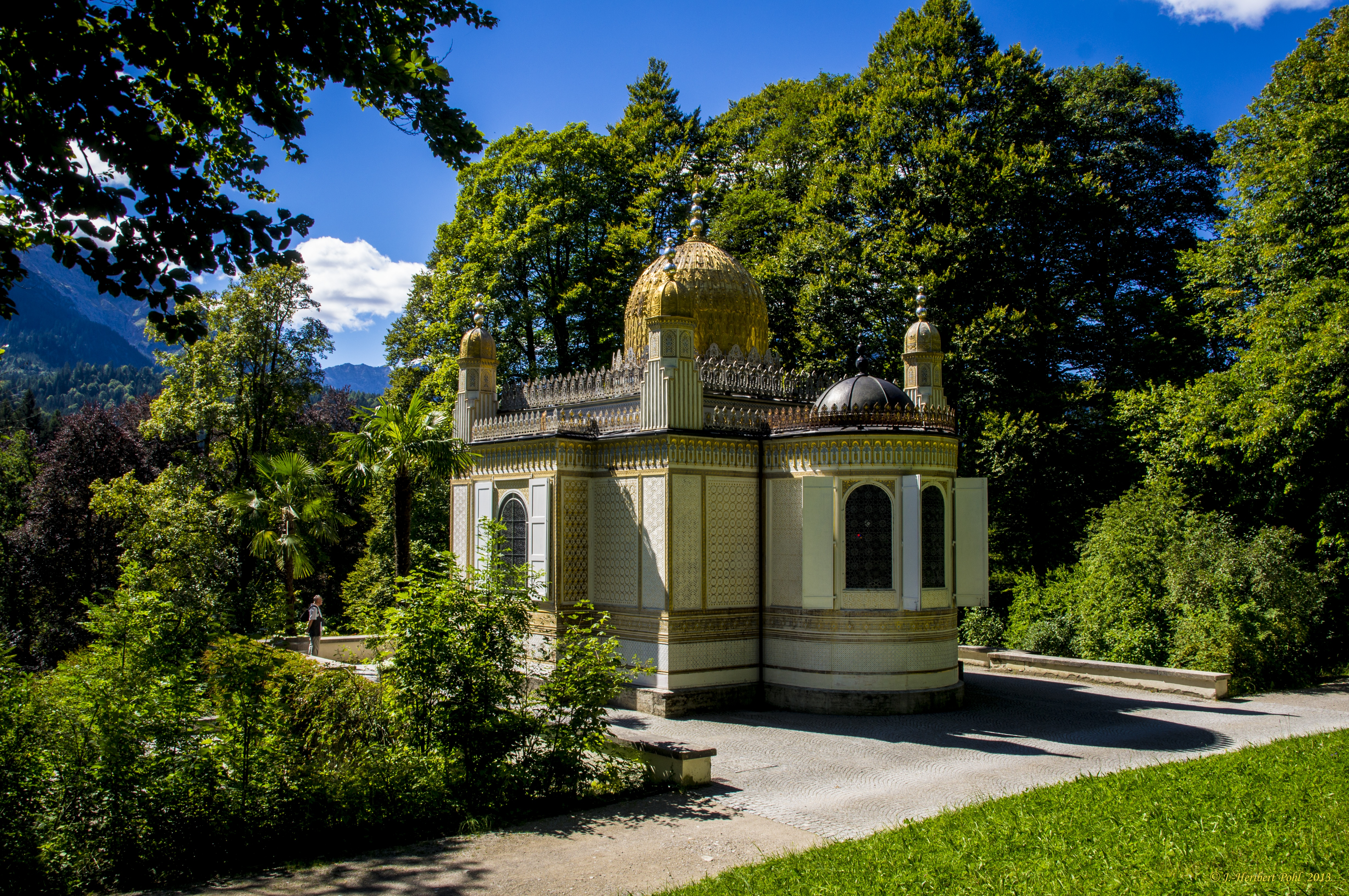
The Moorish kiosk

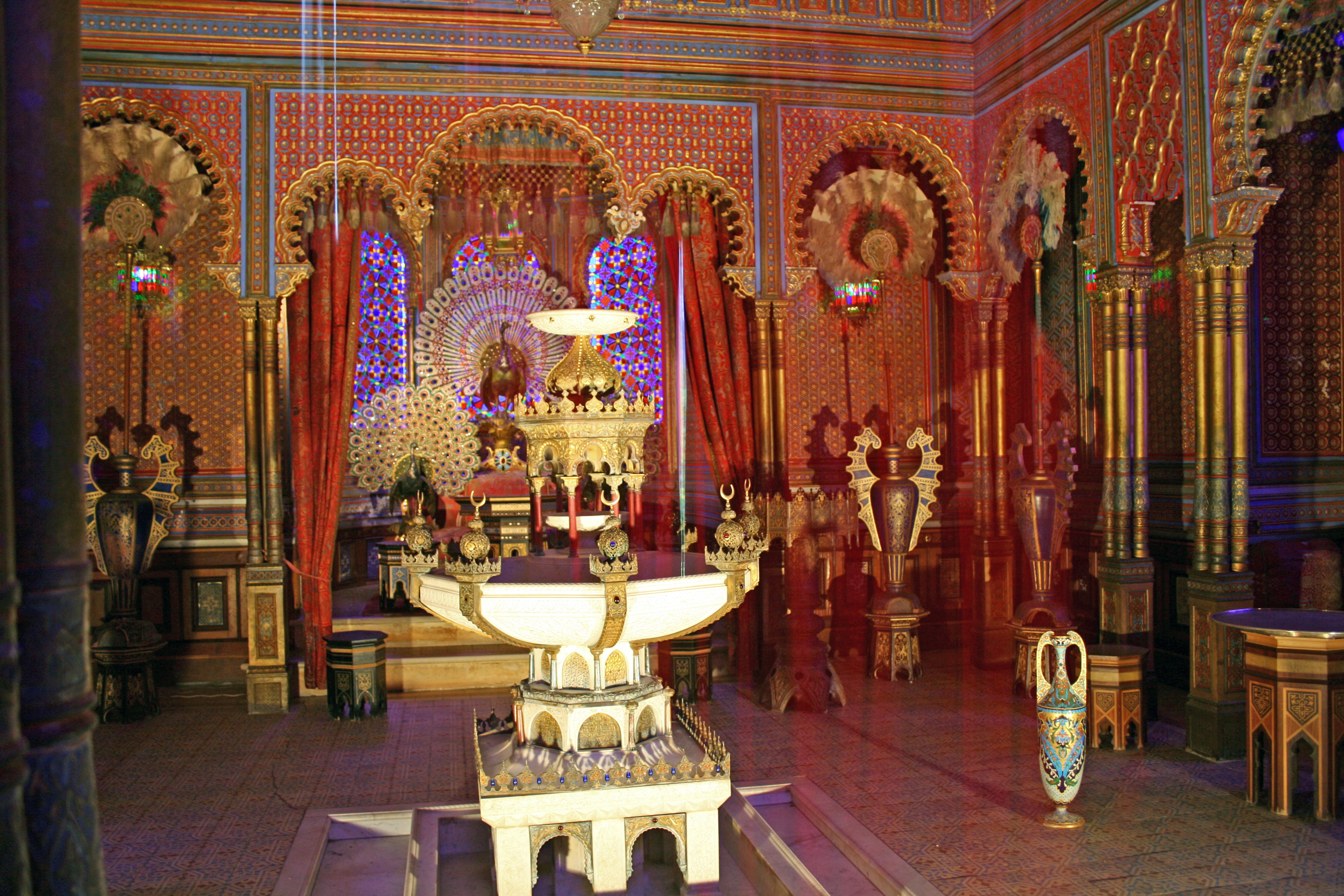
Interior of the Moorish kiosk with the "Peacock Throne" in the background

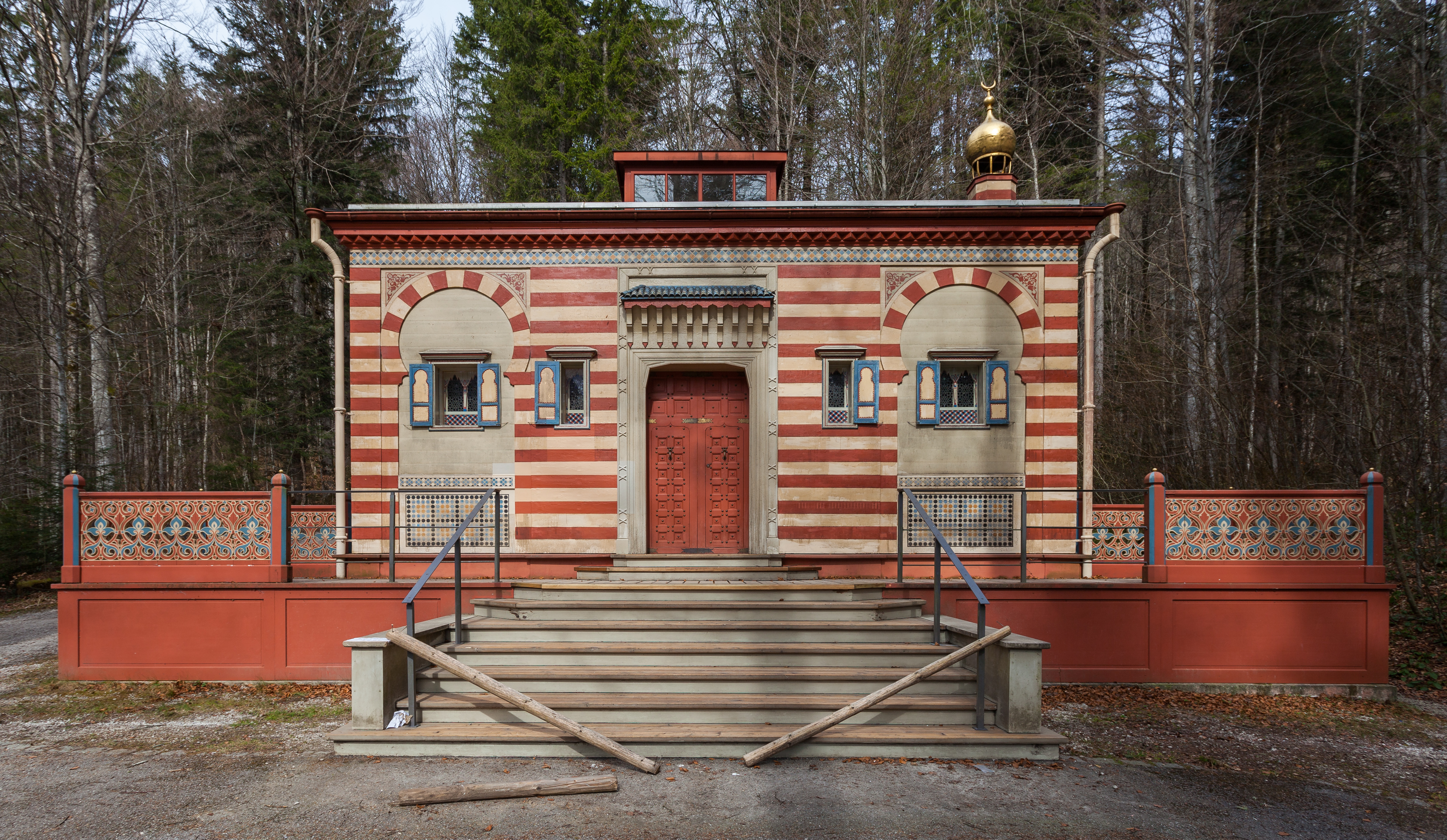
The Moroccan House

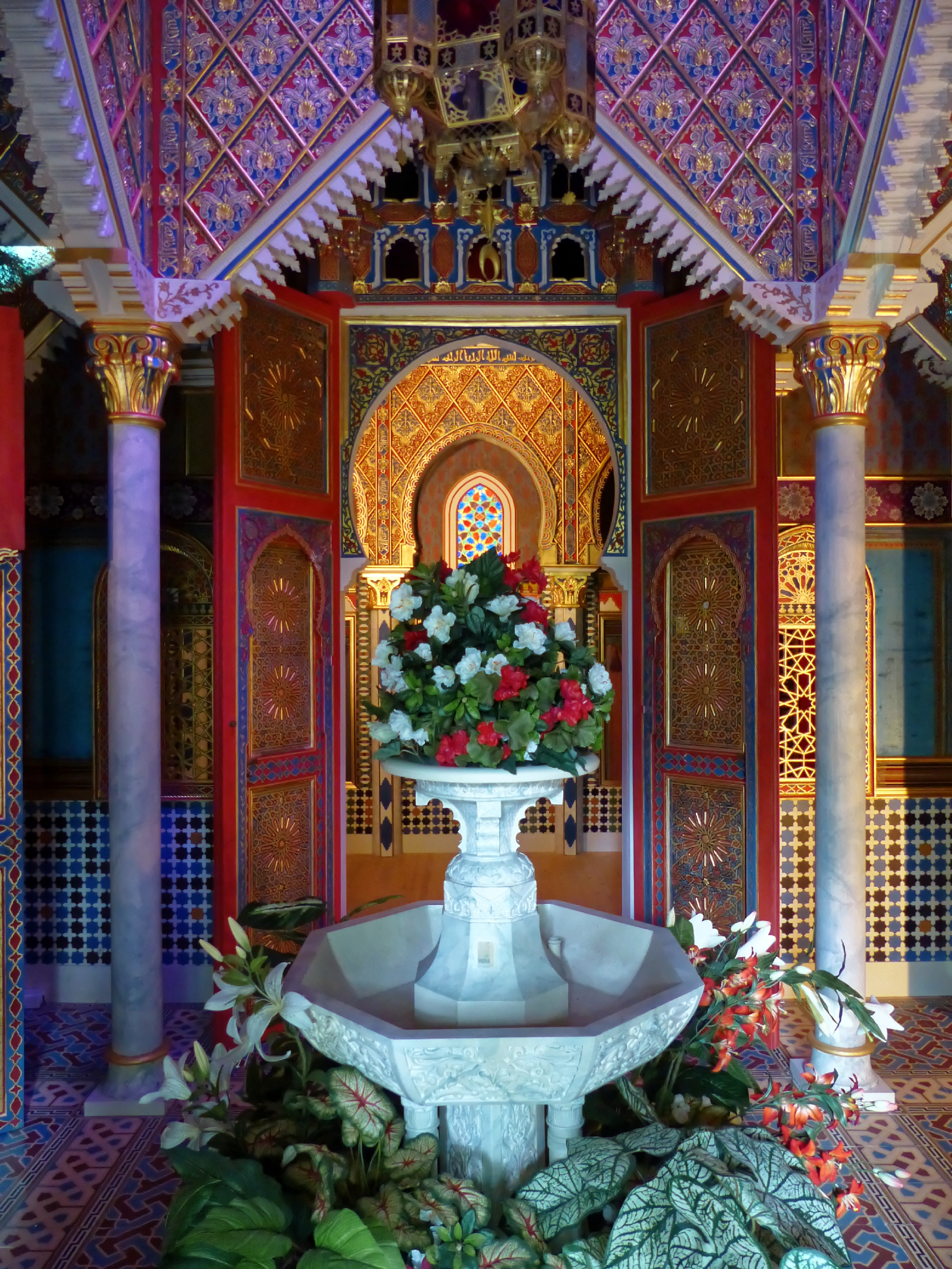
Interior of the Moroccan House

Moroccan House

This wooden house was actually built in Morocco for the International Exhibition in Vienna 1873. The king bought it in 1878 and redecorated it in a more royal Moorish revival style. Unlike the King's House on Schachen, which had been built around 1870 and whose Turkish Hall features an oriental-inspired, opulent mix of styles, the kiosk is more authentically influenced by Moorish architecture. It was set up in the furthest area of the park, very close to the Austrian border. After the king's death, the Moroccan House was sold to a private purchaser in Oberammergau, where it slowly fell into disrepair in a garden. In 1980 the house was bought back, carefully restored and rebuilt at a new location in the park closer to the palace. It has stood there since 1998.

== See also ==
- List of Baroque residences
