= Tapayuna language =

Northern Jê language of Brazil

Tapayúna
- Kajkwakhrattxi
- Kajkwakhrattxi kawẽrẽ
- Pronunciation: [kajkʰwakʰʀ̥atˈtʃi kaˈw̃ẽɾẽ]
- Native to: Brazil
- Region: Mato Grosso
- Ethnicity: Tapayúna (Kajkwakhrattxi)
- Native speakers: <30 (2021)
- Language family: Macro-Jê: Jê; Cerrado; Northern Jê; Trans-Tocantins; Trans-Araguaia; Tapajós (Suyá)–Tapayuna; Tapayúna

Language codes
- ISO 639-3: None (mis)
- Glottolog: beic1238
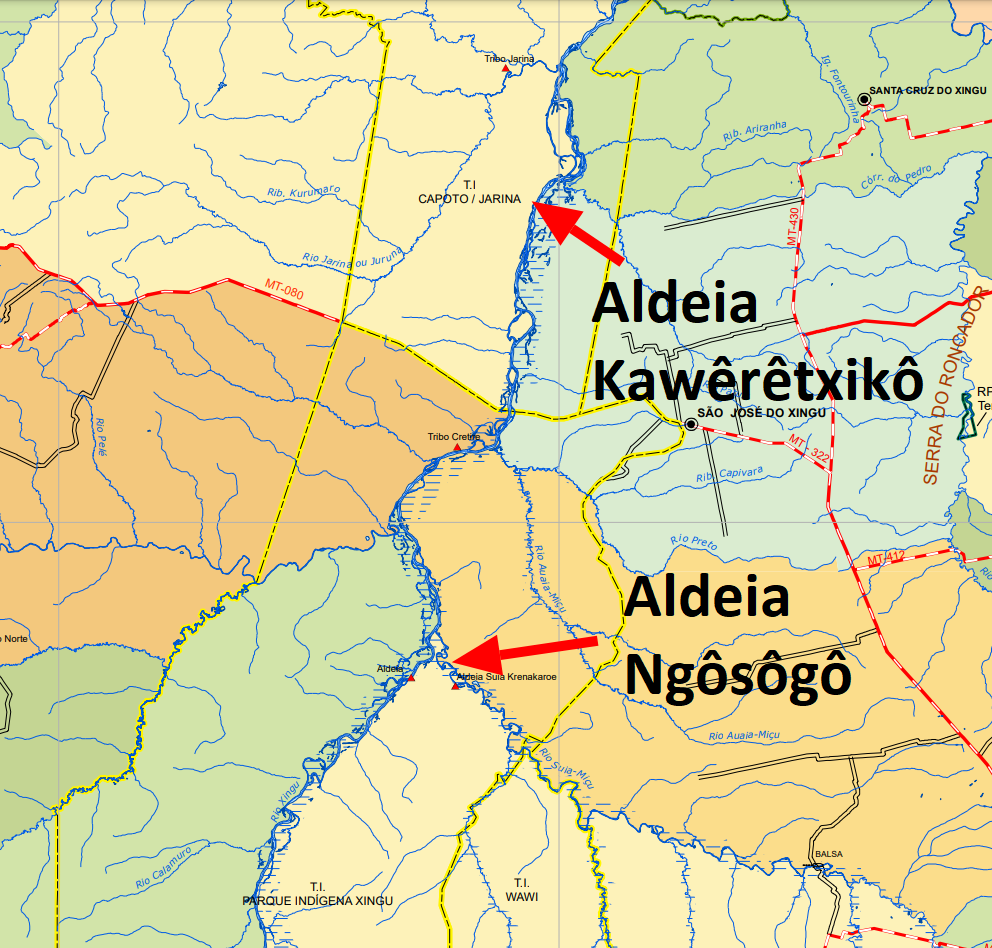
- Villages where Tapayuna is spoken.

Tapayúna (Kajkwakhrattxi or Kajkwakhratxi, 'big trunk of the sky' also spelt Tapajúna, Tapayúna: Kajkwakhrattxi kawẽrẽ [kajkʰwakʰʀ̥atˈtʃi kaˈw̃ẽɾẽ]) is a Northern Jê language (Jê, Macro-Jê) spoken in Mato Grosso, Brazil by the Tapayúna (Kajkwakhrattxi) people.

The Tapayuna historically lived on the Arinos River, in the Tapajós basin, between Juruena and Aripuanã. They were decimated in mid-20th century as a result of numerous conflicts with Brazilian settlers, rubber tappers, and ranchers; it is estimated that their population declined 90% until reaching 41 individuals in 1969, which has been characterized as an ethnocide. The surviving Tapayúna were then transferred to Xingu Indigenous Park at some point between 1969 and 1970, resulting in 10 more deaths. At first, they stayed with the Kĩsêdjê, speakers of a closely related language. Later, many Tapayúna moved to Terra Indígena Capoto-Jarina, where they went on to live with the Mẽtyktire subgroup of the Kayapó people, speakers of another Northern Jê language, Mẽbêngôkre. It is assumed that the Tapayúna language has been influenced both by Kĩsêdjê and Mẽbêngôkre. In 2010, 97 speakers have been reported in the Kawêrêtxikô village (Capoto-Jarina). In contrast, only a few elders speak the language in the Ngôsôkô village (Wawi), where the Kĩsêdjê are the ethnic majority. The number of speakers in the Ngôjhwêrê village (Wawi) is unknown.

Tapayúna is closely related to Kĩsêdjê; together, they form the Tapajós branch of Northern Jê. The common past on the Tapajós River, shared by the Tapayúna and the Kĩsêdjê, is still part of their oral history. Phonological differences between the languages include the reflexes of Proto-Northern Jê *m/*mb, *mr/*mbr, *c (in onsets), *ñ (in codas), and *b (in stressed syllables). In Tapayúna, these consonants are reflected as w ([w̃]), nr ([ɾ̃]), t ([t̪]), j ([j]), and w ([w]), respectively, whereas Kĩsêdjê has m/mb, mr/mbr, s, n, and p in the same words.

== Phonology ==
Tapayúna innovated with respect to Proto-Tapajós via the following sound changes:

- merger of *t̪ʰ and *t̪ as t /t̪ʰ/;
- *p > w /w/;
- *m(b), *m(b)r > w /w̃/, nr /ɾ̃/;
- *kʰj, *mbj > x /tʃ/, j /j/;
- *-m, *-n, -ñ > /-p/, /-t/, /-j/.

=== Consonants ===
	Labial	Alveolar		Retroflex	Palatal	Velar		Glottal	
	Labial	plain	labial	Retroflex	Palatal	plain	labial	plain	labial
Nasal	m	n			ɲ	ŋ			
Plosive		t	tʷ	ʈ	tʃ	k	kʷ		
Fricative								h	hʷ
Rhotic		ɾ							
Sonorant	w	(l)			j				

- /k/ and /t/ are realized as [kʰ] and [tʰ] respectively when before /h/ or in stressed syllable-medial position before back vowels.
- /k/ is also voiced to [ɡ] when in unstressed syllable-medial position between vowels.
- Nasals /m, n, ŋ/ become prenasalized stops [ᵐb, ⁿd, ᵑɡ] when in syllable-onset position.
- /ɾ/ can have an allophone [ɽ] when following /ŋ/, [ʀ] when in a branched syllable-onset after a voiced sound, [ʀ̥] when in a branched syllable-onset after /k/, and as [l] when in an initial and medial syllable onset.
- /j/ is realized as an affricate [dʒ] when in an initial and medial syllable-onset, with a prenasalized [ᶮdʒ] in free variation.
- /w, ɾ, j/ are nasalized [w̃, ɾ̃, j̃] when in nasal positions.

=== Vowels ===
The vowel inventory of Tapayuna is shown below (the orthographic representation is given in italics; the characters in slashes stand for the IPA values of each vowel).

	Oral			Nasal		
	Front	Central	Back	Front	Central	Back
Close	i /i/	y /ɨ/	u /u/	ĩ /ĩ/	ỹ /ɨ̃/	ũ /ũ/
Close-mid	ê /e/	â /ə/	ô /o/	ẽ /ẽ/		õ /õ/
Open-mid	e /ɛ/	à /ʌ/	o /ɔ/		ã /ɐ̃/	
Open		a /a/				

==== Echo vowels ====
In Tapayúna, an echo vowel is inserted in words whose underlying form ends in a consonant. The epenthesized vowels are unstressed, as in rowo [ˈɾɔwɔ] ‘jaguar’, tàgà [ˈtʌgʌ] ‘bird’, khôgô [ˈkʰogo] ‘wind’.

== Morphology ==
=== Inflectional morphology ===
==== Finiteness ====
As in all other Northern Jê languages, verbs inflect for finiteness and thus have a basic opposition between a finite form (also Short Form and main form) and a nonfinite form (also Long Form). Finite forms are used in matrix clauses only, whereas nonfinite forms are used in all types of subordinate clauses as well as in some matrix clauses (including negated, future, and progressive clauses). Nonfinite forms are most often formed via suffixation and/or prefix substitution. Some verbs (including all descriptives with the exception of katho ‘to leave’, whose nonfinite form is kathoro) lack an overt finiteness distinction.

The available nonfinite suffixes are /-ɾ/ (the most common option, found in many transitive and intransitive verbs), /-j/ (found in transitive verbs and in some intransitives whose stem ends in the vowel /a/), as well as /-k/ and /-p/ (found in a handful of intransitive verbs which take a nominative subject when finite), as shown in the table below.

Nonfinite suffixes in Tapayúna
finite	nonfinite	gloss
suffix /-ɾ/ (/-j/ after /a/)
wõ	wõrõ	to go (plural)
wĩ	wĩrĩ	to kill (singular)
rê	rêrê	to swim
wy	wyry	to take (singular)
twâ	twârâ	to bathe
nghre	ngere	to dance
khrẽ	khẽrẽ	to eat (singular)
khu	khuru	to eat (plural)
ikhwâ	khwârâ	to defecate
ithu	thuru	to urinate
awi	tàwiri	to go up
suffix /-j/
wê	wêj	to scratch
wa	waj	to hear, to understand
kawa	kawaj	to extract (singular)
nta	ntaj	to bite
wu	wuj	to see
jarẽ	jarẽj	to say
wẽ	wẽj	to throw (singular)
kahõ	kahõj	to wash
kuhwê	kuhwêj	to sweep
ru	ruj	to spill
suffix /-p/
thẽ	thẽw	to go (singular)
ikhõ	khõw	to drink
ta	tãw	to be, to stand (singular)
suffix /-k/
thy	thyk	to die

In Proto-Northern Jê, several verbs derived their finite forms by means of leniting the stem-final consonant (*-t, *-c, *-k → *-r, *-j, *-r). In Tapayúna, at least two verbs retain this pattern, though the relation between the finite and nonfinite forms has been obfuscated by a series of regular sound changes, including *-ôj > -wâj (-âj after a labial), *-c > -t.

Nonfinite suffixes in Tapayúna
finite	nonfinite	gloss	Proto-Northern Jê finite	Proto-Northern Jê nonfinite
ngõrõ	nhõn	to sleep	*ŋõr	*ñõt
wâj	wôt	to arrive	*bôj	*bôc

==== The erstwhile palatalizing prefix ====
In Proto-Northern Jê, a small set of verbs formed their nonfinite forms by employing one of the aforementioned processes and a morphophonological process whereby the onset of the stressed syllable became palatal, and the nucleus of the stressed syllable was raised (if possible); this has been attributed to the influence of an underlying palatalizing nonfinite prefix. In Tapayúna, at least two verbs still follow the archaic pattern.

finite	nonfinite	gloss
ka	tàrà	to roast
ngõrõ	nhõn	to sleep

==== Prefix substitution or loss ====
In addition to the aforementioned processes, the finiteness inflection may involve prefix substitution or loss. For example, the valency-reducing prefixes are a(j)- (anticausative) and a- (antipassive) in finite verb forms, but wi- and tá-/tu-, respectively, in the nonfinite forms. In addition, some verbs which denote physiological activities or movement have a prefix (i- and a-, respectively) in their finite forms but not in the nonfinite form. Some examples are given below.

finite	nonfinite	gloss
anticausatives
ajkhẽ	wikhẽj	to have fun
antipassives
awi	tàwiri	to go up
physiological verbs
ikhõ	khõw	to drink
ikhwâ	khwârâ	to defecate
ithu	thur	to urinate
movement verbs
atá	tárá	to enter (singular)

==== Nominal number ====
Nouns which denote human beings may receive the plural suffix -jê, as in wẽwyjê ‘men’ (← wẽwy) ‘man’.

=== Derivational morphology ===
==== Productive affixes ====
Tapayúna makes use of the diminutive suffixes -tĩ and -re, as well as of the augmentative suffix -txi. Examples include: taratĩ ‘its small wing’ or taratĩre ‘its tiny wing’ (← tara ‘its wing’, an inflected form of jara ‘wing’), hrytĩ ‘small, narrow path’ or hrytĩre ‘a very narrow path’ (← hry ‘path’), thêtxi ‘tick’ (← thê), wĩtxi ‘alligator’ (← wĩ).

Nominalizations which denote instruments and places are formed by means of attaching the suffix -tà to the nonfinite form of a verb: kahõ ‘to sweep’ → kahõj ‘to sweep (nonfinite)’ → kahõjtà ‘broom’; wẽ ‘people’ + khrĩ ‘to sit (plural, finite = nonfinite)’ → wẽkhrĩtà ‘seat’.

Agent nominalizations are formed by means of attaching the suffix -kanê to the nonfinite form of a verb: hwitô ‘leaf; paper’ + tôk ‘to paint; to write’ → hwĩtôtôkkanê ‘teacher’.

== Lexicon ==
=== Predicate number ===
Tapayúna commonly employs different lexemes for the so called singular and plural predicates (see Northern Jê languages#Verbal number for more information about the semantic counterparts of this distinction in the Northern Jê languages).

Verbal number in Tapayúna
singular	plural	gloss
kura	thithik	to hit
wĩ	hwa	to kill
tẽ	wõ	to go
