= Trans-Araguaia languages =

Proposed subgroup of the Northern Jê languages

Trans-Araguaia
- Geographic distribution: Pará, Mato Grosso
- Linguistic classification: Macro-Jê: Jê; Cerrado; Jê of Goyaz; Northern Jê; Trans-Tocantins; Trans-Araguaia
- Subdivisions: Mẽbêngôkre (Kayapó); Tapajós (Kĩsêdjê, Tapayúna)

Language codes
- ISO 639-3: –
- Glottolog: None

The Trans-Araguaia languages are a proposed subgroup of the Northern Jê languages, which comprises three languages spoken to the west of the Araguaia River: Mẽbêngôkre, Kĩsêdjê, and Tapayúna. It is subdivided in a binary manner into Mẽbêngôkre and the Tapajós subbranch, which comprises Kĩsêdjê and Tapayúna. Together with Apinajé, the Trans-Araguaia languages make up the Trans-Tocantins branch of Northern Jê.
