= Suyá music =

Music of the Suyá people

Suyá music is the music of the Suyá people, a tribe of about 150 people who live on the Suyá-Miçu River and are native to Mato Grosso, Brazil. Their houses are set up in a circle around the village square, where the majority of their ceremonies take place. Other buildings include a men's meeting house where there is almost always singing. Speech and hearing are highly valued in the social behavior of the tribe. The Suyá Indians symbolize their importance with body decorations that include ear and lip disks (also known as lip plates). In 1980, ethnomusicologist Anthony Seeger interpreted this body ornamentation as an emphasis on orality and listening as a principal means of perception, transmission, comprehension, and expression of fundamental values.

Music is a very important part of everyday life for the Suyá people. Their songs stem from ancient ceremonial songs derived from myths, songs learned from outsiders and songs taught to the community by "men without spirits". Men without spirits are men or women who have lost their spirits but can hear songs from animals, plants and insects. They are the ones who bring new songs to the community. Most Suyá music is vocal, although rattles and flutes are known to be used too. The reason for the emphasis on singing is that their music is passed down orally.

The Suyá people use music in myth telling, speech making, and singing. For example, they teach boys, as part of their initiation, how to sing certain songs; the boys learn and practice the songs under adult supervision in a special forest camp a short distance from their village. Although music is used by all members of the tribe, some forms are only used by adults, and some are further restricted to political and ceremonial leaders.

The Suyá people have only recently come to the notice of ethnomusicology, through the work of Anthony Seeger, who has collected most of the available written knowledge of the Suyá Indians.

== Performance context and history ==
Some of the Suyá Indians' singing occurs in the men's house. Suyá music, like that of most Ge-speaking Indians, is vocal—sometimes accompanied by rattles, but very rarely. Throughout Suyá history, singing and vocal music has been one part of a larger oral tradition and oral expression. The Suyá people decorate their earlobes and lower lips with heavy disks; this is believed to signify the importance of vocalization and listening.

Suyá music is ceremonial. Their songs were originally learned by a few special men and women, based on age, sex, and whichever group they belong to. These oral expressions are usually mostly masculine in sound. Suyá music exists in different forms:

- Speech refers to all kinds of speech that are used by the Suyá people.
- Instruction is used tell how to do a task, such as cooking something; the grammar in this case is that of everyday speech. Instruction has different types, for example recitative.
- Song: the Suyá used songs obtained from outsiders whom they brought in to teach the village a myth or a song from their own tribe. Songs were also introduced by "men without spirits", who claim that they can hear new songs from animals in the wild.
- Invocation is a private verbal form meant to be heard by only a few people. The Suyá probably learned their invocations from the Upper Xingu Indians, most likely when the western and eastern Suyá groups began living together. These invocations were used for healing and were more important to the Suyá than herbal medicine. Each specific invocation referred to a special attribute of either an animal, a plant or another natural object. They were based on animal metaphors. For example, the invocation for an easy birth was named "small fish" because of how a fish can slip out of one's hands very easily.

=== Suyá myths ===
For the Suyá there was no single way to tell a myth, unlike the Xokleng Indians. Their myth of creation was memorized. The Suyá story of the origin of corn could be told anywhere by anyone. It is related to the mouse ceremony myth in which the Suyá learn to use garden crops as food.

== Cultural history ==
The Suyá people migrated to the Xingu region around 1840, where they met with a number of groups from whom they obtained women and children and with whom they exchanged other items. They adopted many aspects of Xingu culture, such as canoes, hammocks, ceremonies, food preparation techniques and body ornamentation.

The Suyá people believe strongly in the collective good and share everything, including fire, food, land, songs, performances, shelter, clothes and children. They also believe that a person’s name is central to his or her identity and the groups to which he or she belongs. Today the Suyá live in a single village of about two hundred inhabitants on the banks of the Suiá-Miçu River. They speak a language belonging the northern branch of the Gê language family. They hunt, fish, gather supplies, and trade with frontier settlements to get their basic needs. They are protected from frontier violence and the national market economy by a reservation system that intermittently provides health care and material goods and involves them in a new multiethnic social system.

== Musical structure ==
Vocal music is highly valued in Suyá culture because it is a form of oral expression. For the Suyá people, the ability to hear and speak well are very important. Instruments play a very small role in Suyá music, although rattles or alto Xingu flutes are sometimes used to accompany vocal music.

In song, and any other form, Suyá speech is organized in many ways and has many very distinct structures. However, most of these forms are restricted to use by Suyá men as political and ceremonial leaders.

The Suyá word ngére has all of the meanings "music", "ceremony" and a specific genre of songs. Therefore, all Suyá music is ceremonial and serves a specific purpose in the community. There are no work songs, love songs and suchlike; Suyá songs are all confined to certain rituals in the community, such as the initiation ceremonies of young men where they mark their passage into adulthood with the piercing of their lips and ears.

Though they have the same structure, there are two distinct genres in Suyá music, called akia (shouted song) and ngére. Akia are masculine songs shouted in a high register. When sung by a group of men, heterophonic textures are often created, as different songs are often performed at once with different melodies or tempi. New songs often come from the singers themselves. Ngére are not shouted, but sung in a lower register than akia, in unison, during Suyá ceremonies.

Both akia and ngére are divided into parts. The first half is called kradi, the second sindaw. Both halves are split further into four sections, which are the same in both the kradi and the sindaw. These parts are kwd kaikaw ("song syllables"), sinti sülü ("approaching the name"), sinti iarén ("telling the name"), and kuré ("coda"). These are musical sections, not simply different parts of the text. However, melodies in akia seem to change more through these sections than in ngére.

== Instruments used in Suyá music ==
Suyá musical performances are mainly vocal. Musical instruments play a very small role in Suyá culture, although they are occasionally used. The most frequently used are idiophones, which accompany singing and dancing. The first is hwin krā, a rattle made of individual piqui (Caryocar coriaceum) pits strung together on a central string with hand-spun cotton or sometimes burity-palm fiber. This may be held in the hands or tied to the knees so that the rattle makes a sound with each step. Some of these rattles are also made from deer, tapir, or wild-pig hoofs. A gourd rattle is also played in certain ceremonies. This rattle is made from a gourd partly filled with seeds, with a wooden shaft going through the middle, decorated with a band of young macaw feathers around the middle and a few parrot-wing feathers hanging from a string attached to the tip of the staff.

In one ceremony, certain social groups carry red gourd rattles, other groups carry black rattles, and a third social group concludes the ceremony by chasing the singer-dancers and breaking their rattles. Suya ceremonies were long (a ceremonial period often lasted several months) and organized around rites of passage—especially the initiation of boys into the men's house.

Even though the Suyá were aware of and even knew how to make a variety of Upper Xingu woodwind instruments, they did not seriously make and play them, though they did seriously perform Upper Xingu sung ceremonies.
