= Idiophone =

Class of musical instruments

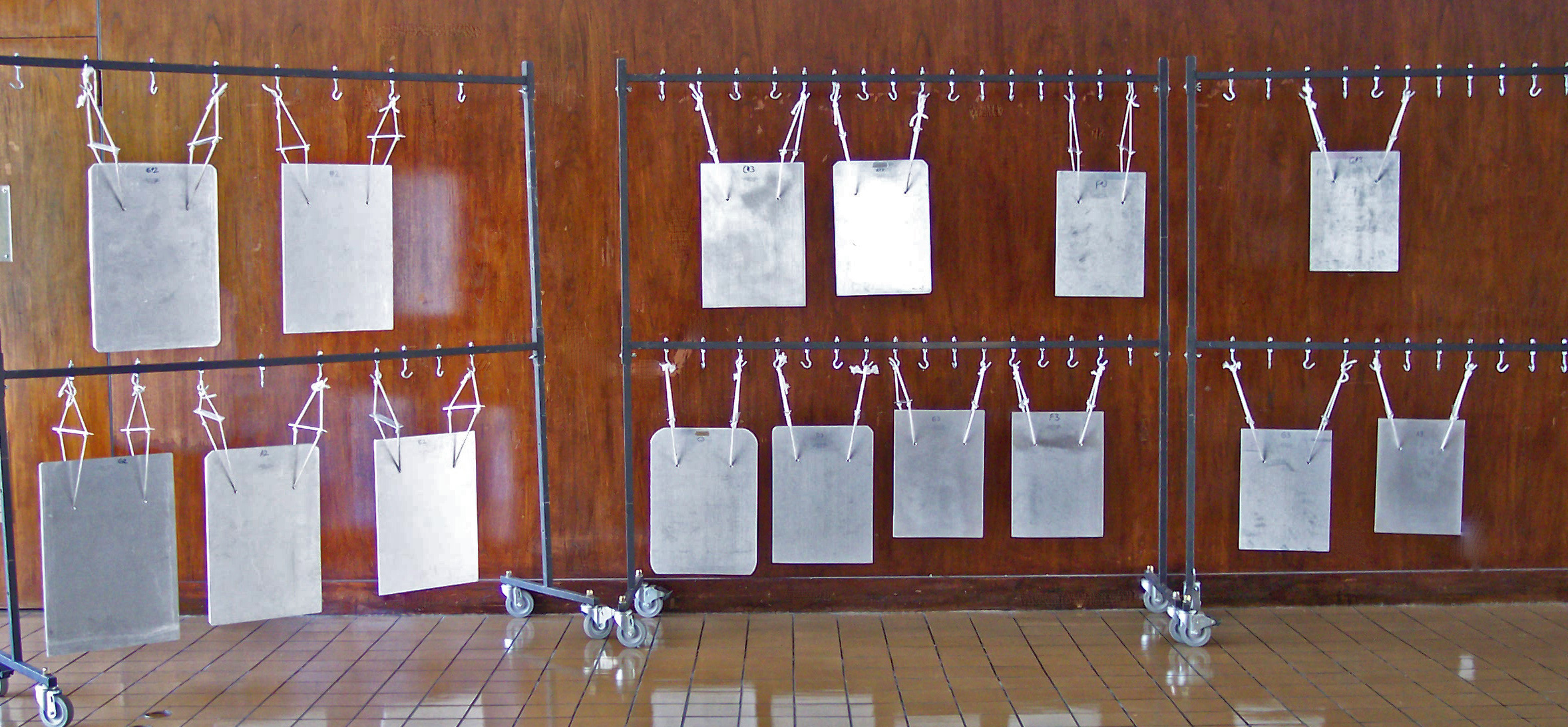
Set of bell plates, range C2–E4, a struck idiophone (played with mallets) or friction idiophone (bowed)

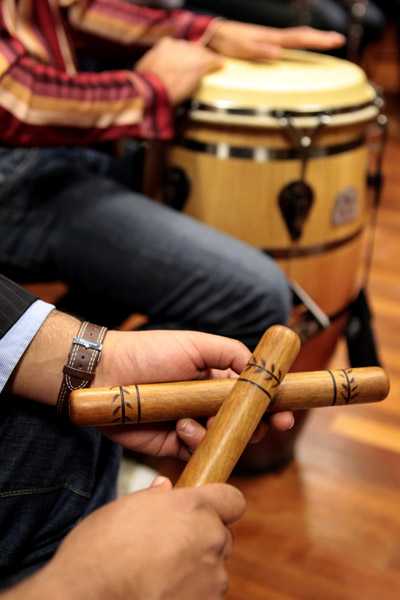
Claves (foreground), a struck idiophone

An idiophone is any musical instrument that creates sound primarily by the vibration of the instrument itself, without the use of air flow (as with aerophones), strings (chordophones), membranes (membranophones) or electricity (electrophones). It is the first of the four main divisions in the original Hornbostel–Sachs system of musical instrument classification (see List of idiophones by Hornbostel–Sachs number). The early classification of Victor-Charles Mahillon called this group of instruments autophones. The most common are struck idiophones, or concussion idiophones, which are made to vibrate by being struck, either directly with a stick or hand (like the wood block, singing bowl, steel tongue drum, handpan, triangle or marimba) or indirectly, with scraping or shaking motions (like maracas or flexatone). Various types of bells fall into both categories. A common plucked idiophone is the Jew's harp.

According to Sachs, idiophones

are instruments made of naturally sonorous materials not needing any additional tension as do strings and drumskins. In this class it is the player's action that has shaped the instruments, because they have originated from extensions of striking or clapping hands or stamping feet. Accordingly, the basic question is how they are set into vibration.

== Etymology ==
The word is from Ancient Greek, a combination of idio- ("own, personal" or "distinct") and -phone ("voice, sound").

== Categories ==
Most percussion instruments that are not drums are idiophones. Hornbostel–Sachs divides idiophones into four main sub-categories. The first division is the struck idiophones (also known sometimes as concussion idiophones). This includes most of the non-drum percussion instruments familiar in the West. They include all idiophones made to vibrate by being struck, either directly with a stick or hand (like the wood block, singing bowl, steel tongue drum, triangle or marimba) or indirectly, by way of a scraping or shaking motion (like maracas or flexatone). Various types of bells fall into both categories.

The other three subdivisions are rarer. They are plucked idiophones, such as the Jew's harp, amplified cactus, kouxian, dan moi, music box and mbira (lamellophone or thumb piano); blown idiophones, of which there are few examples, with the Aeolsklavier being one; and friction idiophones, such as the singing bowl, glass harmonica, glass harp, turntable, verrophone, daxophone, styrophone, musical saw, and nail violin (a number of pieces of metal or wood rubbed with a bow).

Other classifications use six main sub-categories:

- Concussion idiophones are instruments that produce sound by being struck against one another.
- Percussion idiophones produce sound by being struck with a non-vibrating foreign object. Examples of non-vibrating objects are mallets, hammers, and sticks.
- Rattle idiophones are shaken.
- Scraper idiophones are instruments that are scraped with a stick or other foreign objects to give off a sound.
- Plucked idiophones produce sound by plucking a flexible tongue from within the instrument itself.
- Friction idiophones are rubbed to increase vibration and sound intensity.

For example, a pop toob is a brand name for a noisemaker or musical instrument consisting of tubes that are extendable, bendable, and connectable, with the noise being created concussively by the bending and unbending, or popping, of the tube's corrugation, whereas a whirly tube uses corrugated tubing and the difference in speed and thus air pressure to create an aerophone when spun in a circle.

== Design ==
Most idiophones are made of glass, metal, ceramics, or wood. They are considered part of the percussion section in an orchestra.

A number of idiophones that are normally struck, such as vibraphone bars and cymbals, can also be bowed.

== See also ==
- Pitched percussion instrument
- Lithophone
- Metallophone
