= Trans-Tocantins languages =

Proposed subgroup of the Northern Jê languages

Trans-Tocantins
- Geographic distribution: Tocantins, Pará, Mato Grosso
- Linguistic classification: Macro-Jê: Jê; Cerrado; Jê of Goyaz; Northern Jê; Trans-Tocantins
- Subdivisions: Apinajé; Trans-Araguaia (Mẽbêngôkre, Kĩsêdjê, Tapayúna)

Language codes
- ISO 639-3: –
- Glottolog: None

The Trans-Tocantins languages are a proposed subgroup of the Northern Jê languages, which comprises four languages spoken to the west of the Tocantins River: Apinajé, Mẽbêngôkre, Kĩsêdjê, and Tapayúna. It is subdivided in a binary manner into Apinajé, spoken to the east of the Araguaia River, and the Trans-Araguaia subbranch, which includes the remaining three languages. Together with the Timbira dialect continuum, the Trans-Tocantins languages make up the Northern branch of the Jê family.

The defining innovations of the Trans-Tocantins languages include the replacement of Proto-Goyaz Jê and Proto-Northern Jê *a-mbə ‘eat (intransitive)’ (as preserved in Canela/Krahô/Parkatêjê apà, Pykobjê aapỳ, Panará -ânpâ) with Proto-Trans-Tocantins *ap-ku (> Apinajé apku, Mẽbêngôkre aku, Kĩsêdjê/Tapayúna akhu). as well as the fortition of Proto-Northern Jê *j to *ĵ in unstressed syllables (except if preceded by the low vowel *a), as shown below.

Proto-Northern Jê	gloss	Proto-Trans-Tocantins	Apinajé	Mẽbêngôkre	Kĩsêdjê	Tapayúna
*jujarẽñ	‘to narrate (nonfinite)’	*ĵujarẽñ	xujarẽnh	djujarẽnh	tujarẽn	tujarẽj
*jəbir	‘to go up (nonfinite)’	*ĵəbir	xàpir	djàbiri	tápiri	tàwiri
