= Kĩsêdjê language =

Macro-Jê language spoken in Brazil

Kĩsêdjê
- Suyá
- Khĩsêtjê kapẽrẽ
- Pronunciation: [kʰĩˈsedʒe kaˈpẽɽẽ]
- Native to: Brazil
- Region: Xingu Indigenous Park, Mato Grosso
- Ethnicity: Kĩsêdjê (Suyá)
- Native speakers: 350 (2006)
- Language family: Macro-Jê: Jê; Cerrado; Northern Jê; Trans-Tocantins; Trans-Araguaia; Tapajós (Suyá); Kĩsêdjê

Language codes
- ISO 639-3: suy
- Glottolog: suya1243
- ELP: Suyá

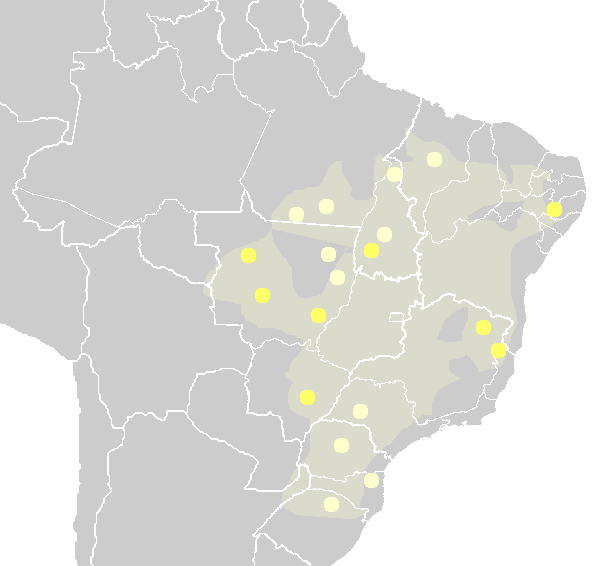
Position of languages

Kĩsêdjê (Suyá, Kĩsêdjê: Khĩsêtjê kapẽrẽ [kʰĩˈsedʒe kaˈpẽɽẽ]) is a Northern Jê language (Jê, Macro-Jê) spoken in Mato Grosso, Brazil. It is closely related to Tapayúna; together, they form the Tapajós branch of Northern Jê.

Kĩsêdjê is closely related to Tapayúna; the common past on the Tapajós River, shared by the Kĩsêdjê and the Tapayúna, is still part of their oral history. Phonological differences between the languages include the reflexes of Proto-Northern Jê *m/*mb, *mr/*mbr, *c (in onsets), *ñ (in codas), and *b (in stressed syllables). In Kĩsêdjê, these consonants are reflected as m/mb, mr/mbr, s, n, and p, respectively, whereas Tapayúna has w ([w̃]), nr ([ɾ̃]), t ([t̪]), j ([j]), and w ([w]) in the same words.

== Phonology ==
=== Consonants ===
Kĩsêdjê preserved the consonants of Proto-Tapajós almost intact, with the exception of the sound change *t̪ʰ > s.

The consonant inventory of Kĩsêdjê is shown below (the orthographic representation is given in angle brackets; the characters to the left stand for the IPA values of each consonant).

		Bilabial	Alveolar	Palatal	Velar	Glottal
Approximant		w ⟨w⟩	ɹ ⟨r⟩	ɲ ~ j ⟨nh, j⟩		
Nasal		m ~ ᵐb ⟨m, mb⟩	n ~ ⁿd ⟨n, nd⟩	ɲ ~ j ⟨nh, j⟩	ŋ ~ ᵑg ⟨ng⟩	
Plosive	prenasal	m ~ ᵐb ⟨m, mb⟩	n ~ ⁿd ⟨n, nd⟩		ŋ ~ ᵑg ⟨ng⟩	
Plosive	tenuis	p ⟨p⟩	t ⟨t⟩	tʃ ⟨tj⟩	k ⟨k⟩	
Plosive	aspirated		tʰ ⟨th⟩		kʰ ⟨kh⟩	
Fricative			s ⟨s⟩			h ⟨h⟩

==== Onsets ====
The following table lists some of the possible onsets of Kĩsêdjê; in addition, most of these can further combine with /w/ or /ɲ/ (in words whose Proto-Northern Jê etyma contain one of *wa, *wə̂, or *jê, which are analyzed as complex nuclei). Underlying nasals acquire an oral phase preceding an oral nucleus.

Kĩsêdjê onsets
		Labial	Labial + rhotic	Dental/ (Post)alveolar	Palatal	Velar	Velar + rhotic	Glottal	Glottal + rhotic
Stop	plain	p /p/ [p]		t /t/ [t̪]	tj /tʃ/ [tʃ]	k /k/ [k]			
Stop	aspirated			th /tʰ/ [t̠ʰ]		kh /kʰ/ [kʰ]	khr /kʰɽ/ [kʰɹ]		
Stop	prenasalized			nt /ⁿt/ [nt̪]					
Stop	nasal	m/mb /m/ [m]/[mb]	mr/mbr /mɽ/ [mɽ̃]/[mbɽ]	n/nd /n/ [n]/[nd]	nh/j /ɲ/ [ɲ]/[nj] ~ [j]	ng /ŋ/ [ŋ]/[ŋg]	ngr /ŋɽ/ [ŋɹ̃]/[ŋgɹ]		
Fricative				s /s/ [s]				h(w) /h(w)/ [h(w)]	hr /hɽ/ [hɽ]
Sonorant		w /w/ [w]		r /ɽ/ [ɽ]					

=== Vowels ===
The vowel inventory of Kĩsêdjê is shown below (the orthographic representation is given in angle brackets; the characters to the left stand for the IPA values of each vowel). Nonato (2014) reports that there is no allophonic variation. By convention, the tilde, which is part of the graphemes that denote nasal vowels, is left out in the orthography following ⟨m, n, nh⟩ (but not ⟨ng⟩), as in mo [mɔ̃] ‘to go (plural)’. In addition, the vowels /ɘ̃/ and /ã/ are not differentiated in the orthography (both are written as ⟨ã⟩).

	Front		Central		Back	
	oral	nasal	oral	nasal	oral	nasal
Close	i ⟨i⟩	ĩ ⟨ĩ⟩	ɨ ⟨y⟩	ɨ̃ ⟨ỹ⟩	u ⟨u⟩	ũ ⟨ũ⟩
Close-mid	e ⟨ê⟩		ɘ ⟨â⟩	ɘ̃ ⟨ã⟩	o ⟨ô⟩	
Open-mid	ɛ ⟨e⟩	ɛ̃ ⟨ẽ⟩	ɜ ⟨á⟩		ɔ ⟨o⟩	ɔ̃ ⟨õ⟩
Open			a ⟨a⟩	ã ⟨ã⟩		

==== Echo vowels ====
Kĩsêdjê has a phenomenon whereby an echo vowel is obligatorily inserted in utterance-final words whose underlying form ends in a consonant; that way, all utterances end in vowels on surface in Kĩsêdjê. Vowel epenthesis often causes the underlying coda to lenite. The resulting alternations are represented orthographically, as in thep [ˈt̠ʰɛp̚] / thewe [ˈt̠ʰɛwɛ] ‘fish’, wit [ˈwit̚] / wiri [ˈwiɾi] ‘only’, ngrôt [ˈŋgɹot̚] / ngrôrô [ˈŋgɹoɾo] ‘the Pleiades’, khẽn [ˈkʰɛ̃n̚] / khẽne [ˈkʰɛ̃nɛ̃] ‘stone’, hwysysôm [hʷɨsɨˈsom̚] / hwysysômy [hʷɨsɨˈsomɨ] ‘mosquito’. In words that end in an underlying rhotic coda, echo vowels are inserted regardless of whether the word is in the utterance-final position, as in ngõrõ [ˈŋɔ̃ɽɔ̃] ‘to sleep’ (forms such as *[ˈŋɔ̃ɽ] are unattested).

== Morphology ==
=== Finiteness ===
As in all other Northern Jê languages, verbs inflect for finiteness and thus have a basic opposition between a finite form (also form B and main form) and a nonfinite form (also form A and embedded form). Finite forms are used in matrix clauses only, whereas nonfinite forms are used in all types of subordinate clauses as well as in some matrix clauses. Nonfinite forms are most often formed via suffixation and/or prefix substitution. Some verbs (including all descriptives with the exception of katho ‘to leave’, whose nonfinite form is kathoro) lack an overt finiteness distinction.

The available nonfinite suffixes are /-ɽ/ (the most common option, found in many transitive and intransitive verbs, with its allomorph /-j/ after the vowel /a/), /-n/ (found in some transitive verbs), as well as /-k/, /-m/, and /-t/ (found in a handful of intransitive verbs which take a nominative subject when finite), as shown in the table below.

Nonfinite suffixes in Kĩsêdjê
finite	nonfinite	gloss
suffix /-ɽ/ (/-j/ after /a/)
mo	morõ	to go (plural)
pĩ	pĩrĩ	to kill (singular)
rê	rêrê	to cross
jantô	jantôrô	to hang (plural)
py	pyry	to take (singular)
twâ	twârâ	to bathe
ngre	ngere	to dance
mba	mbaj	to know, to hear, to understand
hwa	hwaj	to kill (plural)
kapa	kapaj	to extract (singular)
ka	kaj	to grill (singular)
suffix /-n/
ru	run	to spill
mbâ	mbân	to grab (singular)
kakhê	kakhên	to scratch
ahwê	táhwên	to work
jandê	jandên	to press, to squeeze
jarẽ	jarẽn	to say
suffix /-k/
thy	thyk	to die
rwâ	rwâk	to descend
ihwê	hwêk	to fart
suffix /-m/
thẽ	thẽm	to go (singular)
ikhõ	khõm	to drink
ta	tãm	to stand (singular)
suffix /-t/
angjê	ngjêt	to enter (plural)

In Proto-Northern Jê, several verbs derived their finite forms by means of leniting the stem-final consonant (*-t, *-c, *-k → *-r, *-j, *-r). In Kĩsêdjê, at least three verbs retain this pattern, though the relation between the finite and nonfinite forms has been obfuscated by a series of regular sound changes, including *-ôj > -wâj (-âj after a labial), *-c > -t.

Nonfinite suffixes in Kĩsêdjê
finite	nonfinite	gloss	Proto-Northern Jê finite	Proto-Northern Jê nonfinite
ngõrõ	nhon	to sleep	*ŋõr	*ñõt
pâj / pâji	pôt	to arrive	*bôj	*bôc
ro hwâj / ro hwâji	ro hôt	to extract (plural)	*pôj	*pôc

==== The erstwhile palatalizing prefix ====
In Proto-Northern Jê, a small set of verbs formed their nonfinite forms by employing one of the aforementioned processes and a morphophonological process whereby the onset of the stressed syllable became palatal, and the nucleus of the stressed syllable was raised (if possible); this has been attributed to the influence of an underlying palatalizing nonfinite prefix. In Kĩsêdjê, some of these verbs still follow the archaic pattern, though the relation between the finite and nonfinite forms has been obfuscated by a series of regular sound changes.

finite	nonfinite	gloss
kutho (pl. jatho)	kusôn (pl. jasôn)	to ignite
kujathe	kujasêk	to push
ngõrõ	nhon	to sleep
ngõ	nhorõ	to give
(khrã) tha	(khrã) syry	to cut off (singular)
ne	nhyrỹ	to do so, to say so

==== Prefix substitution or loss ====
In addition to the aforementioned processes, the finiteness inflection may involve prefix substitution or loss. For example, the valency-reducing prefixes are a(j)- (anticausative) and a- (antipassive) in finite verb forms, but wi- and tá-/tu-, respectively, in the nonfinite forms. In addition, some verbs which denote physiological activities or movement have a prefix (i- and a-, respectively) in their finite forms but not in the nonfinite form. Some examples are given below.

Finiteness and prefix alternations in Kĩsêdjê
finite	nonfinite	gloss
anticausatives
ajkhẽ	wikhẽn	to laugh
ajpã	wipãn	to be drunk
akhrõ	wikhrõn	to gather (of people, anticausative)
antipassives
ajarẽ	tujarẽn	to narrate
ambra	támbra	to shout
apê	tápêrê	to blow (of wind)
api	tápiri	to go up
akhĩn / akhĩni	tákhĩn	to shout
ahwê	táhwên	to work
physiological verbs
ikhõ	khõm	to drink
ihwê	hwêk	to fart
movement verbs
atá	tárá	to enter (singular)
angjê	ngjêt	to enter (plural)

== Nominative–absolutive clauses ==
Future, progressive, continuous, completive, and negated clauses in Kĩsêdjê show a cross-linguistically rare morphosyntactic alignment pattern, known as the nominative–absolutive alignment.

Kĩsêdjê has also been considered unusual in the literature because of its unexpected (from a cross-linguistic point of view) distribution of ergative and nominative marking of transitive agents in certain types of clauses, such as future and negative clauses. More specifically, transitive agents expressed by a full noun phrase are nominative (marked by the subject marker ra in the examples below), whereas pronominal transitive agents are ergative, as in the following examples:

Ludo ra thep khu-ru mã.
Ludo SM fish eat.PL-NF FUT
‘Ludo will eat fish.’

Ro-txi ra mĩ-txi pĩ-rĩ khêrê.
anaconda-AUG SM caiman-AUG kill.SG-NF NEG
‘The anaconda did not kill the caiman.’

I-re hwĩ-sy rẽ-n mã.
1SG-ERG tree-seed throw.PL-NF FUT
‘I will pick fruit.’

I-re hwĩ-ngrá jantô-rô khêrê.
1SG-ERG tree-dry hang.PL-NF NEG
‘I didn't hang the firewood.’

Such split has been previously considered to be impossible by R. M. W. Dixon:

Cross-referencing systems are thus basically pronominal (with the affixes having developed from free-form pronouns, in some earlier stage of the language). We would expect them to be on a nominative-accusative pattern, since this characterizes pronouns at the extreme left of the hierarchy … What we can predict is that, if there is a ‘split’ of this kind, then bound prefixes will be accusative and case-marking on free forms will be ergative. This is exactly what is found.
