= Aeolodion =

Wind instrument

The aeolodion or aeolodicon (also called in Germany Windharmonika) is an obsolete keyed wind instrument resembling the harmonium, its tone being produced from steel springs. It had a range of six octaves, and its tone was similar to that of the harmonium. After its invention around 1800, several modifications were made, including the aeolsklavier, aeolomelodicon or choraleon, and aeolopantalon, but all versions had largely disappeared by mid-century.

== History ==
There is some controversy as to its original inventor; most authorities attribute it to Jean Tobié Eschenbach of Hamburg, who is said to have first made it in 1800. Various improvements were subsequently made by other musicians, among whom may be named Schmidt of Pressburg, Carl Friedrich Voit of Schweinfurt, Sebastian Müller (1826), and Friedrich Sturm of Suhl (1833). This instrument was entirely superseded by the harmonium.

== Related instruments ==
=== Aeolsklavier ===
A modification of the aeolodion was the aeolsklavier, invented about 1825 by Karl Friedrich Emanuel Schortmann of Buttelstädt, in which the reeds or springs that produced the sound were made of very thin wood instead of metal. For this reason, the quality of tone was made softer and sweeter. It was equipped with a keyboard and with a pedal which triggered a set of bellows (one for each note) and produced a soft and ethereal sound. The instrument was unsuccessful and appears to have been soon forgotten.

=== Aeolomelodicon (Choraleon) ===
A further modification was the aeolomelodicon or choraleon, constructed by Fidelis Brunner at Warsaw, about the year 1825, from the design of Professor J. F. Hoffmann in that city. It differed from the æolodion in the fact that brass tubes were affixed to the reeds, much as in the reed-stops of an organ. The instrument was of great power, and was probably intended as a substitute for the organ in small churches, especially in the accompaniment of chorals, whence its second name choraleon. It has taken no permanent place in musical history.

=== Aeolopantalon ===
In the aeolopantalon, invented about the year 1830, by Jozé Dlugosz of Warsaw, the æolomelodicon was combined with a piano, so arranged that the player could make use of either instrument separately or both together. A somewhat similar plan has been occasionally tried with the piano and harmonium, but without great success. It is chiefly remembered because Frédéric Chopin played this instrument at various recitals.
