= Suyá =

Indigenous people of Brazil

Total population
- 330 (2010)

Regions with significant populations
- Brazil (Mato Grosso)

Languages
- Suyá language

Religion
- traditional tribal religion

The Suyá, self-denomination Kisêdjê, are Indigenous people in Brazil, at the headwaters of the Xingu River.

Historically, they were known for their lip plates, an unusual form of body modification which they practiced. After marriage, Suyá men used to have their lower lip pierced, and have a small wooden disk placed inside. The size of the disk would be gradually increased as time went on, permanently changing the size of the lip.

Like many other tribes in the upper Xingu, the Suyá have been devastated by diseases introduced by European explorers in the late 19th and early 20th centuries. After the establishment of the Xingu Indigenous Park in the 1960s, and after the introduction of organised medical care into the area, the population of the Suyá grew greatly. Their population has increased from 123 in 1970, to 330 in 2010.

== Language ==
The kisêdjê language is of the jê family.

== Cultural bistory ==
There are not many archaeological or ethnographic records extending back before 1884 as little cultural material could be preserved in the humid tropics since most materials used were organic. However, the ethnographic evidence that does exist claims that the Suyá music people made a long journey from a territory more than 1,100 kilometers to the northeast, fleeing and fighting enemies. They migrated to the Xingu region around 1840, where they met with a number of groups with whom they obtained women, children, and exchanged items. Although many of these tribes spoke different languages they shared a similar culture, and the region where they settled is often referred to today as the "Upper Xingu Culture Area." From the Xingu they adopted many aspects of their culture such as; canoes, hammocks, and ceremonies. They also adapted food preparation techniques, such as believing that all food must be cooked before eaten. Body ornamentation was also an aspect of their culture that they took on. Body ornaments are significant markers of age and status.

The Suyá community has always believed greatly in the collective good. They share everything from fire, food, land, songs, performances, shelter, clothes, and children. A child is raised by the whole community, not just by their biological parents, and although they know who their biological parents are, they do not identify with them as a westernized person would, with a sense of ownership, to a Suyá person the entire community is their family. Their names also have much more importance than people from the western world attribute to names as well. They believe that names are central to the definition of who a person is and the groups to which he or she belongs; therefore, they pick their names very carefully. Today the Suyá live in a single village of about two hundred inhabitants on the banks of the Suiá-Miçu River. They speak a language belonging the northern branch of the Gê language family. They hunt, fish, gather supplies, and trade with frontier settlements to get their basic needs. They are also protected from frontier violence and the national market economy by a reservation system that intermittently provides health care and material goods and involves them in a new multiethnic social system. Their myths claim that, although the Suyá society always existed, in the beginning the people had no fire, no names, no garden crops, no lip-disc ornaments, and few songs. They acquired fire from the jaguar, garden crops from the mouse, lip discs from enemy Indians, names from a cannibal people living under the ground, and songs from all of these.
