= Pará Gavião language =

Dialect Cluster spoken in Brazil

Pará Gavião
- Native to: Brazil
- Region: Maranhão, Pará, Tocantins
- Ethnicity: Gavião
- Native speakers: 600–700 (2020)
- Language family: Macro-Jê: Jê; Cerrado; Jê of Goyaz; Northern Jê; Timbira; Pará Gavião
- Dialects: Krĩkatí; Pykobjê; Parkatêjê; Kỳikatêjê

Language codes
- ISO 639-3: gvp
- Glottolog: para1315
- ELP: Gavião de Parã

Pará Gavião is a Jê language which is part of the Timbira (Northern Jê) dialect cluster of Brazil.

== Varieties ==
Linguistic varieties of Gavião include:

- Krĩkatí, spoken in Terra Indígena Krikati, Maranhão
- Pykobjê, 600 speakers in Terra Indígena Governador close to Amarante, Maranhão
- Parkatêjê, 12 speakers in Terra Indígena Mãe Maria, Bom Jesus do Tocantins, Pará
- Kỳikatêjê, 9 speakers in Terra Indígena Mãe Maria, Bom Jesus do Tocantins, Pará

See Timbira language for details.
