= Kỳikatêjê people =

Kỳikatêjê
Total population
- 174

Languages
- Portuguese, Kỳikatêjê

Related ethnic groups
- other Timbira peoples

The Kỳikatêjê (Gavião-Kỳikatêjê) are an Indigenous people of Brazil. Their original language is Kỳikatêjê, a Timbira language of the Jê languages language family (Macro-Jê) most closely related to Parkatêjê. The Kỳikatêjê currently live in Terra Indígena Mãe Maria (Bom Jesus do Tocantins in southeastern Pará), but their original location was located further to the east, up the Tocantins River in the state of Maranhão. Their name means 'upstream' in Kỳikatêjê.

The Kỳikatêjê are known for forming the first professional Indigenous football club in Brazil in 2009, which has since competed in the Campeonato Paraense.
