= Gavião =

Gavião may refer to:

== People ==
- Gavião (Gê), an indigenous Gê-speaking people of Pará and Maranhão, Brazil
  - Pará Gavião language, a Gê language spoken by the Gavião of Pará and Maranhão
- Gavião (Rondônia), an indigenous people of Rondônia, Brazil
  - Gavião of Jiparaná, a Tupian language spoken by the Gavião of Rondônia, Brazil

== Places ==
- Gavião, Bahia, a municipality in Bahia, Brazil
- Gavião, Portugal, a municipality in Portalegre, Portugal
- Gavião (parish), a civil parish in Gavião, Portugal
- Gavião (Vila Nova de Famalicão), a civil parish in Vila Nova de Famalicão, Portugal
