= XRE =

XRE may refer to:

- ISO 4217:XRE, the RINET funds code
- xre, the ISO 639-3 code for Krẽje language
