= Timbira language =

Northern Je language spoken in Brazil

Timbira
- Native to: Brazil
- Region: Maranhão, Pará, Tocantins
- Ethnicity: Timbira
- Native speakers: 5,000 (2005–2008)
- Language family: Macro-Jê: Jê; Cerrado; Jê of Goyaz; Northern Jê; Timbira
- Dialects: Canela–Krahô; Pará Gavião; Krẽje

Language codes
- ISO 639-3: Variously: ram – Canela xra – Krahô gvp – Pará Gavião xri – Krĩkatí xre – Krẽje
- Glottolog: timb1253

Timbira is a dialect continuum of the Northern Jê language group of the Jê languages ̣(Macro-Jê) spoken in Brazil. The various dialects are distinct enough to sometimes be considered separate languages. The principal varieties, Krahô /ˈkrɑːhoʊ/ (Craó), and Canela /kæˈnɛlə/ (Kanela), have 2000 speakers apiece, few of whom speak Portuguese. Pará Gavião has 600–700 speakers. Krẽje, however, is nearly extinct, with only 30 speakers in 1995.

Timibira has been intensive contact with various Tupi-Guarani languages of the lower Tocantins-Mearim area, such as Guajajára, Tembé, Guajá, and Urubú-Ka'apór. Ararandewára, Turiwára, Tupinamba, and Nheengatu have also been spoken in the area. Some of people in the area are also remembers of Anambé and Amanajé.

== Varieties ==
Linguistic varieties of Timbira include:

- Canela (subdivided into Apànjêkra and Mẽmõrtũmre (a.k.a. Ràmkôkãmẽkra)), 2,500 speakers in Maranhão
- Krahô, 2,000 speakers in Tocantins
- Krĩkatí, spoken in Terra Indígena Krikati, Maranhão
- Pykobjê, 600 speakers in Terra Indígena Governador close to Amarante, Maranhão
- Parkatêjê, 12 speakers in Terra Indígena Mãe Maria, Bom Jesus do Tocantins, Pará
- Kỳikatêjê, 9 speakers in Terra Indígena Mãe Maria, Bom Jesus do Tocantins, Pará
- Krẽje, under 30 speakers in Maranhão and Pará

=== Loukotka (1968) ===
Loukotka (1968) divides the Timbira tribes into two groups, Timbirá (Canela) and Krao. The majority are included under Timbira:

Timbira (Canela)

- Mehin, Tajé (Timbirá)
- Kreapimkatajé (Krepúnkateye)
- Krenjé (Krẽyé)
- Remkokamekran (Remako-Kamékrere, Merrime)
- Aponegicran (Apáñekra)
- Krenkatajé (Canella, Kenkateye)
- Sakamekran (Chacamecran, Mateiros)
- Purekamekran, Makamekran (Pepuxi)
- Apinagé, Karaho (Carauau)
- Menren (Gaviões, Augutjé – only a few words known)
- Meitajé

Krao

- Krahó, Krikati (Kỳikatêjê)
- Piokobjé (Bucobu, Pukobje, Paicogê)
- Kapiekran

Under the Timbira group, Loukotka included several purported languages for which nothing is recorded: Kukoekamekran, Karákatajé, Kenpokatajé, Kanakatayé, Norokwajé (Ñurukwayé). The Poncatagê (Põkateye) are likewise unidentifiable.

=== Ramirez et al. (2015) ===
Ramirez et al. (2015) considers Timbira-Kayapó to be a dialect continuum, as follows:

Canela-Krahô ↔ Gavião-Krĩkati ↔ Apinajé ↔ Kayapó ↔ Suyá-Tapayuna ↔ Panará-Kayapó do Sul

Apart from Kapiekran, all Krao varieties are recognized by the ISO.

Another common convention for division, though geographic rather than linguistic, is Western Timbira (Apinayé alone) vs Eastern Timbira (Canela, Krikatí, Krahô, Gavião, and others).

Gurupy is a river, sometimes used to refer to the Krenye.
