= Krahô dialect =

Canela-Krahô dialect of Brazil

Krahô
- Mehĩ jarkwa
- Pronunciation: [mẽˈhĩ jaɾˈkʰwa]
- Native to: Brazil
- Region: Tocantins
- Ethnicity: Krahô
- Native speakers: 2,000 (2020)
- Language family: Macro-Jê: Jê; Cerrado; Jê of Goyaz; Northern Jê; Timbira; Canela-Krahô; Krahô

Language codes
- ISO 639-3: xra
- Glottolog: krah1246
- ELP: Krahô

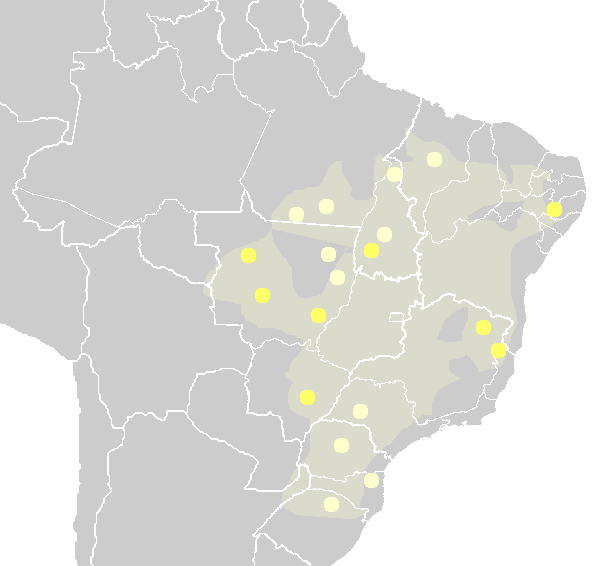

Krahô (Krahô: Mehĩ jarkwa [mẽˈhĩ jaɾˈkʰwa]) is a dialect of the Canela-Krahô language, a Timbira variety of the Northern Jê language group (Jê, Macro-Jê) spoken in Tocantins, Brazil by the Krahô people.

== Phonology ==
=== Vowels ===
	Front	Central	Back	
Close	i ĩ	ɨ ɨ̃	u ũ	
Close-mid	e ẽ		ɤ	o õ
Open-mid	ɛ		ʌ	ɔ
Open		a ã		

- A short /a/ can have an allophone of [ə].

=== Consonants ===
		Labial	Dental/ Alveolar	Palatal	Velar	Glottal
Stop	voiceless	p	t̪	tʃ	k	ʔ
Stop	aspirated				kʰ	
Fricative						ɦ
Nasal		m	n̪		ŋ	
Flap			ɾ			
Approximant		ʋ ~ w		j		

- /ʋ/ is realized as [w] when occurring in between vowels.
