= Canela people =

Ethnic group in Brazil

Canela
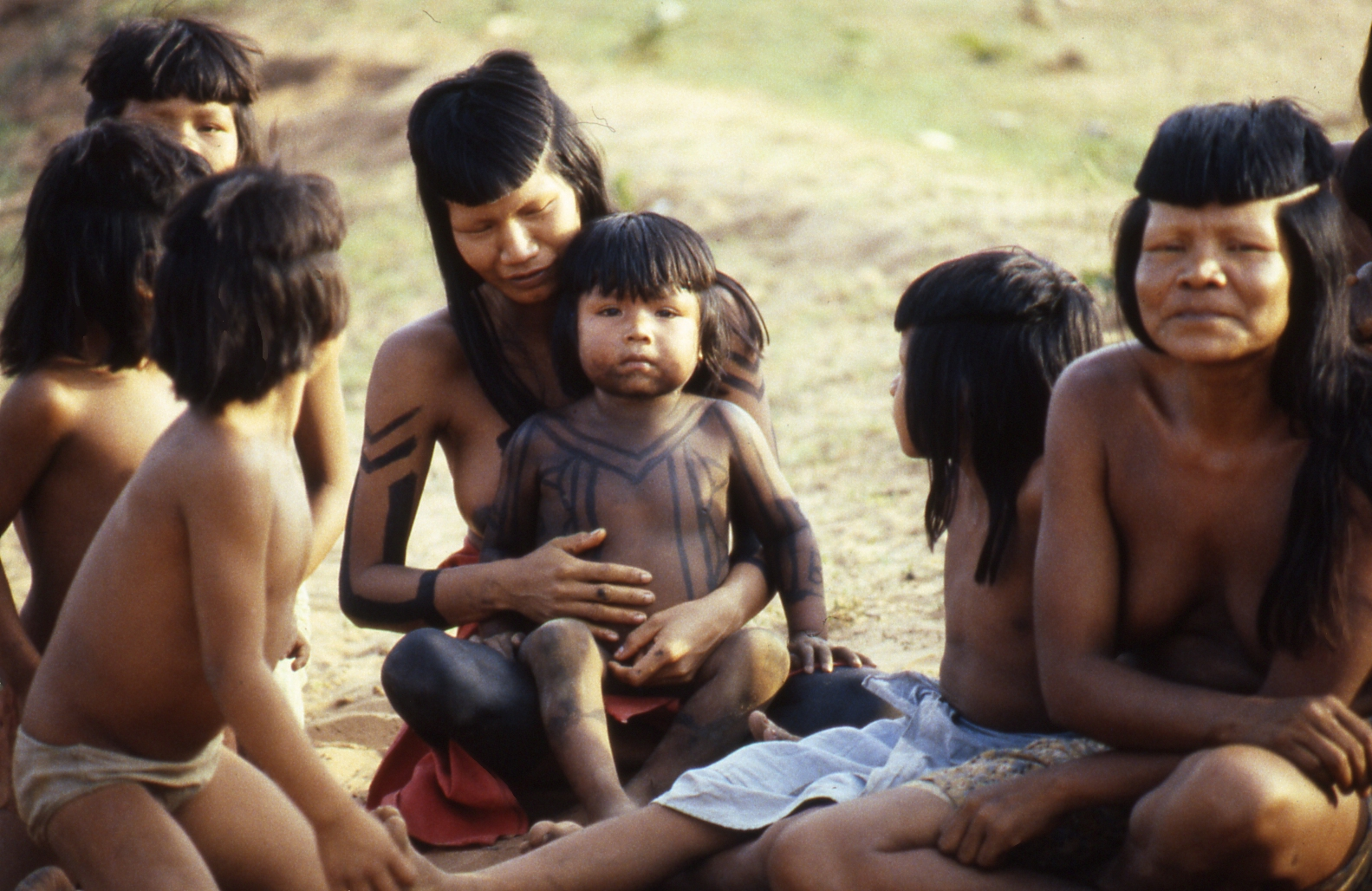

Total population
- 1076

Languages
- Canela language

Related ethnic groups
- other Timbira peoples

The Canela are a group of multiple Indigenous peoples of Northeastern Brazil who speak the Canela language. The peoples historically grouped under the label have included the Ramkokamekrá, Apanyekra, and Kenkateye. Until their pacification and resettlement between 1814 and 1840, the Canela were primarily hunter-gatherers, with some cultivation of garden foods (estimated to be 20% of their subsistence).
