= Bom Jesus do Tocantins, Tocantins =

Municipality in Tocantins, Brazil

Bom Jesus do Tocantins
- Municipality
- Location in Tocantins state

- Location in Brazil
- Coordinates: 8°57′54″S 48°9′57″W
- Country: Brazil
- Region: North
- State: Tocantins

Area
  - Total: 1,333 km^{2} (515 sq mi)

Population (2020)
  - Total: 5,008
  - Density: 3.757/km^{2} (9.730/sq mi)
- Time zone: UTC−3 (BRT)

Bom Jesus do Tocantins is a municipality located in the Brazilian state of Tocantins. Its population is estimated at 5,008 (2020), and its area is 1333 km^{2}.

The Kỳikatêjê and Parkatêjê languages are spoken by the Kỳikatêjê and Parkatêjê peoples respectively in Terra Indígena Mãe Maria, which is located within the municipality of Bom Jesus do Tocantins.

== Sports ==
In 2009, Gavião Kyikatejê Futebol Clube was founded in Bom Jesus do Tocantins, becoming the first professional indigenous football club in Brazil.

== See also ==
- List of municipalities in Tocantins
