= Zeca Gavião =

Brazilian football manager and team president

Personal information
- Full name: Pepkrakte Jakukreikapiti Ronore Konxarti
- Date of birth: 5 August 1966 (age 60)
- Place of birth: Tucuruí, Brazil

Team information
- Current team: Gavião Kyikatejê (president and head coach)

Managerial career
- Years: Team
- 2014: Gavião Kyikatejê
- 2016: Gavião Kyikatejê
- 2020–: Gavião Kyikatejê

Pepkrakte Jakukreikapiti Ronore Konxarti (born 5 August 1966), best known as Zeca Gavião is a Brazilian football manager. He is the president and head coach of Gavião Kyikatejê.
