= Canela dialect =

Canela-Krahô dialect of Brazil

Canela
- Native to: Brazil
- Region: Maranhão
- Ethnicity: Canela (Apànjêkra and Mẽmõrtũmre)
- Native speakers: 2,500 (2012)
- Language family: Macro-Jê: Jê; Cerrado; Jê of Goyaz; Northern Jê; Timbira; Canela-Krahô; Canela
- Dialects: Mẽmõrtũmre (Ràmkôkãmẽkra, Ramkokamekrá); Apànjêkra (Apaniêkrá); Kenkateye †

Language codes
- ISO 639-3: ram
- Glottolog: cane1243 Canela-Krahô
- ELP: Canela

Canela is a dialect of the Canela-Krahô language, a Timbira variety of the Northern Jê language group (Jê, Macro-Jê) spoken by the Apànjêkra (Apaniêkrá) and by the Mẽmõrtũmre (Ràmkôkãmẽkra, Ramkokamekrá) in Maranhão, Brazil. The Kenkateye dialect has been extinct since 1913 due to the massacre of the tribe by cattle ranchers.

== Phonology ==
=== Vowels ===
	Front	Central	Back	
Close	i ĩ		ɯ ɯ̃	u ũ
Close-mid	e		ɤ	o
Open-mid	ɛ ɛ̃		ʌ ʌ̃	ɔ ɔ̃
Open		a ã		

=== Consonants ===
		Labial	Alveolar	Palatal	Velar	Glottal
Stop	voiceless	p	t		k	
Stop	aspirated				kʰ	
Affricate			t͡s			
Fricative						h
Nasal		m	n		ŋ	
Lateral			l			
Approximant		v ~ w		j		

- Stops /p, t, k/ can be voiced [b, d, ɡ] in syllable-initial position within unstressed syllables, following voicing and in syllable-final position following voicing.
- The velar nasal /ŋ/ can fluctuate in free variation with a prenasalized and voiced plosive [ŋɡ~ɡ] between dialects.
- In certain dialects, the affricate /t͡s/ becomes post-alveolar [t͡ʃ].
- /n, m/ are prestopped [ᵈn, ᵇm] when after oral vowels.
- /v/ is only realized as such syllable-initial position, elsewhere it is pronounced as [w].
- /j/ is heard as [z] when in final position of consonant clusters and in initial position within stressed syllables, and is nasalized as [z̃] before nasal vowels. It is heard as [j] elsewhere in syllable-final and unstressed syllable-initial positions.
- /l/ is heard as a lateral flap [ɺ] when in intervocalic positions, or following consonants.
- /h/ is heard as a glottal stop [ʔ] in syllable-final position when preceding consonants, and as a velar [x] before high-oral vowels.

== Morphology ==
=== Finiteness morphology ===
In Canela, like in all Northern Jê languages, verbs inflect for finiteness and thus have a basic opposition between a finite form and a nonfinite form. Finite forms are used in matrix clauses only, whereas nonfinite forms are used in all types of subordinate clauses as well as in some matrix clauses (such as recent past clauses and any clauses which contain modal, aspectual, or polar operators). Nonfinite forms are most often formed via suffixation and/or prefix substitution. Some verbs (including all descriptives with the exception of cato 'to exit', whose nonfinite form is cator) lack an overt finiteness distinction.

The following nonfinite suffixes have been attested: -r (the most common option, found in many transitive and intransitive verbs), -n (found in some transitive verbs), as well as -c and -m (found in a handful of intransitive verbs which take a nominative subject when finite).

Nonfinite suffixes in Canela
finite	nonfinite	gloss
suffix -r
mõ	-mõr	to go
pĩ	-pĩr	to suffocate (of water), to shoot dead, to extinguish
krẽ	-hkrẽr	to eat (singular)
-hcarê	-hcarêr	to weed
-japrô	-japrôr	to take away
suffix -n
-japỳ	-japỳn	to carry (plural)
kê	-hkên	to grate
kwĩ	-hkwĩn	to break (singular)
-hcura	-hcuran	to kill
-hcaxô	-hcaxôn	to peel off, to strip
suffix -c
ty	-htyc	to die
wrỳ	-wrỳc	to descend
suffix -m
tẽ	-htẽm	to go fast
ikõ	-hkõm	to drink
xa	-xãm	to stand (singular)

In Proto-Northern Jê, a handful of verbs, all of which ended in an underlying stop, formed their finite form by means of leniting the stem-final consonant (*-t, *-c, *-k → *-r, *-j, *-r); in turn, the nonfinite form received no overt marking. At least three verbs still follow this pattern in Canela.

Nonfinite suffixes in Canela
finite	nonfinite	gloss
xêr	-hxêt	to burn
gõr	-jõt	to sleep
pôr	-hpôc	to burn, to ignite

==== Palatalizing prefix ====
In Proto-Northern Jê, a small set of verbs formed their nonfinite forms by employing one of the aforementioned processes and a morphophonological process whereby the onset of the stressed syllable became palatal, and the nucleus of the stressed syllable was raised (if possible); this has been attributed to the influence of an underlying palatalizing nonfinite prefix.

Palatalizing prefix in Proto-Northern Jê
finite	nonfinite	gloss
*kaba	*kaĵər	to extract (singular)
*ga	*ĵər	to roast (singular)
*kuto (pl. jato)	*kucôñ (pl. jacôñ)	to ignite
*twə̂ *kaˀtwə̂	*cûk *kaˀcûk	to grind, to pound to grind, to pound, to press against a surface
*kaˀte	*kaˀcêk	to break into pieces
*kujate	*kujacêk	to push, to move away
*ŋõr	*ñõt	to sleep
*ŋõ	*ñõr	to give
*-ˀtĩ	*-ˀcĩk	to plait, to braid
*aˀtĩ	*jəˀcĩk	to sneeze
*(krə̃)ˀta	*(krə̃)ˀcyr	to cut off (singular)
*c-anẽ	*c-añỹr	to do so, to say so

==== Prefix substitution or loss ====
In addition to the aforementioned processes, the finiteness inflection may involve prefix substitution or loss. For example, the valency-reducing prefixes are *a(j)- (anticausative) and *a(p)- (antipassive) in finite verb forms, but *bi(t)- and *jə-/*ju-, respectively, in the nonfinite forms. In addition, some verbs which denote physiological activities or movement have a prefix (*ij- and *a-, respectively) in their finite forms but not in the nonfinite form.

Finiteness and prefix alternations in Proto-Northern Jê
finite	nonfinite	gloss
anticausatives
*ajkaˀte	*bikaˀcêk	to break (anticausative)
*ajkamẽ	*bikamẽñ	to move away
*akndo	*bikndor	to disappear
antipassives
*apjarẽ	*jujarẽñ	to narrate
*aˀcû	*jəˀcwə̂r	to beg
physiological verbs
*ijkõ	*kõm	to drink
*ijtu	*tur	to urinate
*ijkû	*kwə̂r	to defecate
*ijpê	*pêk	to fart
movement verbs
*ajêt	*jêt	to hang (singular)
*aĵə	*ĵər	to enter (singular)
acjêj	-ncjêj	to enter (plural)

=== Person inflection and case ===
In all Northern Jê languages verbs, postpositions, and relational nouns inflect for person of their internal argument by taking absolutive ("internal") or accusative person prefixes. The accusative series is required by a subclass of transitive verbs (in finite clauses only) as well as by some postpositions; the absolutive series is the default one and is found with most transitive and all intransitive verbs in finite clauses, with all verbs in nonfinite clauses, with all relational nouns, and with some postpositions. External arguments of verbs are not indexed by person prefixes but are rather encoded by nominative/agentive (unmarked) noun phrases (including personal pronouns) in finite clauses, or by ergative phrases in nonfinite clauses.

In the table below, the label class II refers to a subclass of vowel-initial stems which take the thematic consonant */ĵ-/ in the basic (uninflected) form as well as in some inflected forms (e.g. *∅-j-arkwa ‘my mouth’, *ba-j-arkwa ‘our mouths’, *rop j-arkwa ‘the jaguar's mouth’) but not in others (*g-arkwa ‘your mouth’, *c-arkwa ‘his/her/its mouth’). The archaic allomorphs *∅-/ĵ-/ (first person, class II) and *g- (second person, class II) are only marginally preserved across Northern Jê: the former is preserved in Pykobjê (as in j-apackre ‘my ear’), whereas the reflexes of the latter have been found in Kĩsêdjê, Canela, Pykobjê and in the triadic kinship terms of Mẽbêngôkre.

Pronouns and person prefixes
person	nominative/agentive pronoun	absolutive	accusative
1	*ba	*ij- (class II: *∅-/ĵ-/)	
2	*ga	*a- (class II: *g-)	
1+2	*gu	*ba-/ĵ-/	
3	(*gê)	*c-	*ku-

=== Voice ===
Two valency-reducing operations are encoded by prefixes in Northern Jê: the anticausative voice (finite *a(j)-, nonfinite *bi(t)-) and the antipassive voice (finite *a(p)-, nonfinite *jə-/*ju-).

Voice alternations in Proto-Northern Jê
transitive	intransitivized	gloss
anticausatives
*kaˀte	*ajkaˀte / *bikaˀcêk	to break (transitive) → to break (anticausative)
*kamẽ	*ajkamẽ / *bikamẽñ	to push → to move away
*kundo	*akndo / *bikndor	to lose → to disappear
antipassives
*jarẽ	*apjarẽ / *jujarẽñ	to say → to narrate
*cû	*aˀcû / *jəˀcwə̂r	to ask → to beg

=== Nominal number ===
In most Northern Jê languages, nouns which denote human beings may receive an overt collective plural suffix (Proto-Northern Jê -jê). Its reflexes have been attested in Kĩsêdjê (-jê), Tapayúna (-jê), Parkatêjê (-jê), Pykobjê (-ji), Canela (-jê), among others. In fact, this suffix is part of many names of Northern Jê peoples, as in Kĩsêdjê, Parkatêjê, Pykobjê (self-denomination Pyhcopji), Apànjêkra, and is the ultimate origin of the term Jê.

== Syntax ==
Canela is a head-final language.

=== Morphosyntactic alignment ===
Different main clause constructions present different combinations of alignment patterns, including split-S (default), ergative–absolutive (recent past), and nominative–absolutive (evaluative, progressive, continuous, completive, and negated clauses). In contrast, subordinate clauses are always ergative–absolutive.

Prototypically, finite matrix clauses in Canela have a split-S alignment pattern, whereby the agents of transitive verbs (A) and the sole arguments of a subclass of intransitive verbs (S_{A}) receive the nominative case (also called agentive case), whereas the patients of transitive verbs (P) and the sole arguments of the remaining intransitive predicates (S_{P}) receive the absolutive case (also called internal case). In addition, transitive verbs are subdivided into two classes according to whether the third person patient is indexed as absolutive (allomorphs h-, ih-, im-, in-, i-, ∅-) or accusative (cu-), which has been described as an instance of a split-P alignment. There are only several dozen of transitive verbs which take an accusative patient, all of which are monosyllabic and have distinct finite and nonfinite forms. It has been suggested that all transitive verbs which satisfy both conditions (monosyllabicity and a formal finiteness distinction), and only them, select for accusative patients, while all remaining transitive verbs take absolutive patients in Canela and all other Northern Jê languages.

All subordinate clauses as well as recent past clauses (which are historically derived from subordinate clauses and are headed by a nonfinite verb) are ergatively organized: the agents of transitive verbs (A) are encoded by ergative postpositional phrases, whereas the patients of transitive verbs (P) and the sole arguments of all intransitive predicates (S) receive the absolutive case (also called internal case).

Evaluative, progressive, continuous, completive, and negated clauses (which are historically derived from former biclausal constructions with an ergatively organized subordinate clause and a split-S matrix clause) in Canela have the cross-linguistically rare nominative-absolutive alignment pattern. An example of this alignment type in negated clauses is given below.

Wa ha iwrỳc naare.
/wa ha i-wɾɘ-k nãːɾɛ/
S TAM s-V AUX
1.NOM IRR 1.ABS-descend-NF NEG
'I will not descend.'

Wa ha ipyr naare.
/wa ha i-pɨ-ɾ nãːɾɛ/
A TAM p-V AUX
1.NOM IRR 3.ABS-take-NF NEG
'I will not grab it.'

In nominative–absolutive clauses, the sole argument of an intransitive verb (S) is aligned with the agent argument of a transitive verb (A) in that both may be expressed by nominative pronouns, such as wa 'I.NOM' or ca 'you.NOM' (nouns do not take case inflection in Canela), which occupy the same position in a phrase (in the example above, both precede the irrealis marker ha). At the same time, the sole argument of an intransitive verb (S) is aligned with the patient argument ('direct object') of a transitive verb (P) in that both may be indexed on the verb by person prefixes of the absolutive series ( such as i- 'I.ABS' or a- 'you.ABS'). There are no elements which pattern as ergative or accusative in this type of clauses in Canela.

The historical origin of the nominative–absolutive clauses in Canela has been shown to be a reanalysis of former biclausal constructions (a split-S matrix clause, headed by the auxiliary, and an ergative–absolutive embedded clause, headed by the lexical verb) as monoclausal, with the loss of the ergative.

=== Classes of predicates ===
The following table summarizes the proposed classes of predicates in Canela.

argument structure in finite clauses	type	examples
A^{NOM} P^{ACC}	transitive verb (cu-class)	krẽ 'to eat' (singular)
A^{NOM} P^{ABS}	transitive verb (default)	-hhôc 'to paint'
S^{NOM}	(active) intransitive verb	tẽ 'to go fast'
S^{ABS}	descriptive	-ncryc 'to be angry'
Exp^{DAT}	monovalent verbum sentiendi	prãm 'to be hungry'
Exp^{DAT} Stimulus^{ABS}	bivalent verbum sentiendi	-hkĩn 'to like'

==== Transitive verbs ====
In Canela, transitive verbs take accusative or absolutive patients in finite clauses, depending on the verb class. In nonfinite clauses, all transitive verbs take absolutive patients. Note that nouns do not receive any overt marking either in the accusative or in the absolutive case; the difference between these two cases is seen in the third person index, whose form is cu- in the accusative case and h- (allomorphs ih-, im-, in-, i-, ∅-) in the absolutive case.

The transitive verbs which index their patient in the accusative case (in finite clauses) are known as cu-verbs. All cu-verbs are monosyllabic and have distinct finite and nonfinite forms. The remaining transitive verbs index their patient in the absolutive case. All verbs that belong to this class satisfy at least one of the following conditions:

- they contain at least two syllables (for example, pupu 'to see', cahô 'to suck, to eat fruits', -hcuhhõ 'to wash (body, hands)'),
- their finite and nonfinite forms are identical (for example, -hhôc 'to paint', -hkre 'to plant', -hpro 'to cover, to catch, to rape').

Finite cu- verbs further differ from all other transitive verbs in that under certain circumstances they index their agent (rather than patient) on the verb. This happens when a second-person agent acts over a third-person patient.

==== Descriptives ====
Intransitive predicates which take absolutive (rather than nominative) subjects are known as descriptives.

==== Verba sentiendi and dative subjects ====
Verba sentiendi take dative subjects in Canela

Monovalent verba sentiendi take only one argument (experiencer), which is encoded by a dative postpositional phrase.

Bivalent verba sentiendi take two arguments. The experiencer is encoded by a dative postpositional phrase, and the theme receives the absolutive case.
