= Gavião Kyikatejê Futebol Clube =

Gavião Kyikatejê
- Full name: Gavião Kyikatejê Futebol Clube
- Nickname(s): Time dos Índios (Team of the Indigenous)
- Founded: 25 January 1981; 44 years ago
- Ground: Estádio Zinho de Oliveira
- Capacity: 5,000
- President: Zeca Gavião
- Head coach: Zeca Gavião
- League: Campeonato Paraense - Série B1
- 2023: Campeonato Paraense - Série B1, 14th out of 20
Home colors	Away colors

Gavião Kyikatejê Futebol Clube is a Brazilian football club based in the city of Bom Jesus do Tocantins. Its main characteristic is its indigenous roots, being highlighted for being the first professional football club owned by indigenous people to compete in the top division of a state championship, in 2014. Previously made up entirely of indigenous people, it is now a mixed team.

Although it is originally from the city of Bom Jesus do Tocantins, it is part of the Marabá football league, the city where the Estádio Municipal Zinho de Oliveira is located, the home ground for their matches.

Its former coach, Zeca Gavião, chief of the village that lends its name to the club, as well as the team's president, also became the first indigenous person to lead a club in the country.

== History ==
Gavião Kyikatejê originates from the former Campeonato Marabaense team Castanheira Esporte Clube. Founded in the 1980s, it was a traditional team in local football, having played in five finals of the Liga de Marabá (disputed by teams not only from Marabá), winning three of them.

In 2007, the Kyikatejê-gavião people acquired the rights to Castanheira in order to have the right to play in the first division of the municipal championship. As the Liga de Marabá does not allow the mention of the indigenous people's name in the association's title, Gavião continued to play in the league under the name Castanheira EC. In the same year that they started to dispute the first division (2007), they finished runners-up and in 2008 they were crowned champions of the local league.

== Professionalization ==
Having good results in the municipal league, the Gavião people decided to professionalize the team in 2009 with the Federação Paraense de Futebol (FPF, Pará Football Federation), adopting the name Gavião Kyikatejê (which in the language of the people who gave it its name means "upstream") Futebol Clube, making such a point in emphasizing their indigenous origin that even the shape of their shield refers to the tip of an arrow and their first uniform refers to the body paintings used by the inhabitants of their village.

In 2009, the team competed in the Campeonato Paraense - Série B1, but did not make it past the group stage.

In 2010, they competed in the second division again, surprisingly finishing third, but not advancing to the main division (only the top two advanced).

In 2011 and 2012, they competed in the second division, but didn't advance both times, finishing in 7th and 6th place respectively.

In 2013, the team achieved excellent results; firstly, in the second division, where they finished second, advancing to the access division, and; in the access division to the first division, disqualifying traditional teams from the state, getting the right to compete in the main stages of the 2014 Campeonato Paraense.

For the dispute of the initial phase of the 2015 Campeonato Paraense, Gavião hired to its technical command Everth Palacios, a former Colombian defender who played in the 1998 FIFA World Cup for his country, as well as having played for Deportivo Cali, Atlético Nacional, Atlético Junior, Shonan Bellmare, Kashiwa Reysol and Boyacá Chicó and being retired since 2011.

== Rivalries ==
Regional sports journalism recognises Águia de Marabá as Gavião's main rival, a team from Marabá of which Gavião (which was at the time Castanheira) played with in three municipal championship finals, in 1993, 1996 and 1998. As Gavião Kyikatejê inherited and owns the rights to Castanheira, they are recognised as Águia’s rivals, and the matches between the teams are called the Clássico Marabaense or Clássico das Aves (Classic of Marabá or Classic of Birds, respectively).
