= Krẽje language =

Jê language of Brazil

Krẽje
- Taje
- Native to: Brazil
- Region: Maranhão and Pará
- Native speakers: "moribund" (2020); 15 (2012) maybe has no fluent speakers left
- Language family: Macro-Jê: Jê; Cerrado; Jê of Goyaz; Northern Jê; Timbira; Krẽje
- Dialects: Kukoekamekran; Bacabal Krẽjê; Araparitíua Timbira

Language codes
- ISO 639-3: xre
- Glottolog: krey1238 Northeastern Timbira
- ELP: Kreye
- Krenjê is classified as Extinct by the UNESCO Atlas of the World's Languages in Danger

Krẽje or Kreye is an Jê language that is spoken in Maranhão and Pará, Brazil. This language is originated from Maranhão, yet probably extinct with a handful of speakers. (In 2012, there were 15 speakers) It was said to be "moribund" by 2020, if not already extinct.
