= Krahô =

Indigenous Timbira Gê people of Brazil

Mehĩ
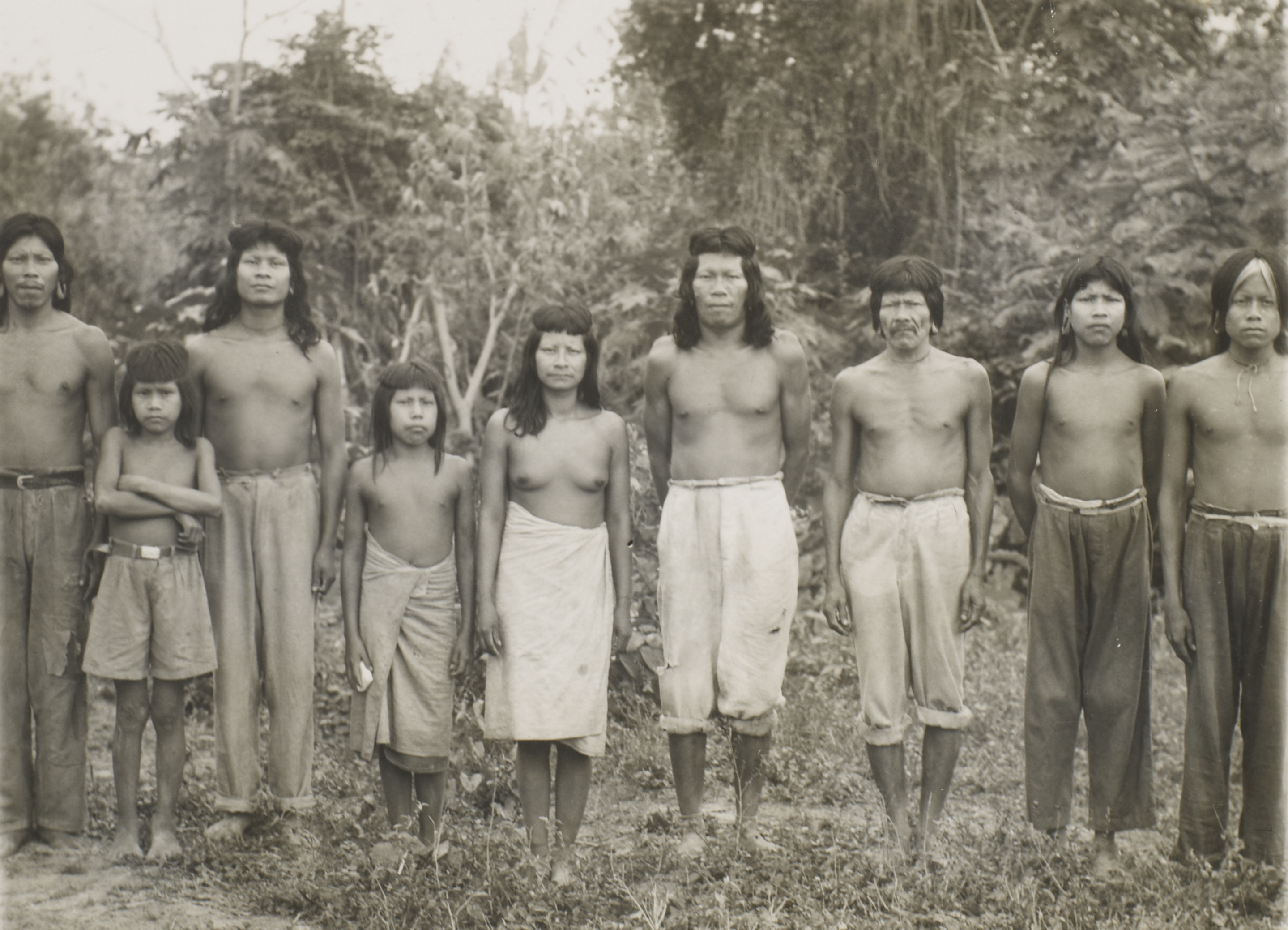

Total population
- 2,000+ (1999)
- 1930: 400
- 1989: 1,198

Regions with significant populations
- Tocantins, Brazil

Languages
- Krahô, Portuguese

The Krahô (/ˈkrɑːhoʊ/, Portuguese: Craós) are an Indigenous Timbira Gê people of northeastern Brazil. The Krahô historically inhabited a portion of modern Maranhão along the Balsas River, but were pushed west by pioneer settlement and cattle farmers. Currently, the Krahô live on the Terra Indígena Kraolândia reservation in Tocantins.

The Krahô have historically been seminomadic, practicing hunting and gathering and shifting cultivation.

== Terra Indígena Kraolândia ==
Modern Krahô live on the Terra Indígena Kraolândia_{,} an Indigenous territory in the Goiatins and Itacajá, Tocantins near the Maranhão-Tocantins border. The territory has an area of 303,000 hectares (1,170 mi^{2}) and a population of 2992.

Location of Terra Indígena Kraolândia Tocantins
