= Kỳikatêjê dialect =

Pará Gavião dialect of Brazil

Kỳikatêjê
- Native to: Brazil
- Region: Pará
- Ethnicity: Kỳikatêjê
- Native speakers: 9? (2015)
- Language family: Macro-Jê: Jê; Cerrado; Jê of Goyaz; Northern Jê; Timbira; Pará Gavião; Kỳikatêjê

Language codes
- ISO 639-3: None (mis)
- Glottolog: None

Kỳikatêjê or Kyikatêjê is a dialect of Pará Gavião, a Jê language of Brazil. It spoken by the Kỳikatêjê people in Terra Indígena Mãe Maria (Bom Jesus do Tocantins, Pará). Almost all speakers are over 40 years old; the younger generations have shifted to Portuguese. Kỳikatêjê is closely related to the Parkatêjê dialect, spoken by another Timbira group in the same reservation.

== Phonology ==
=== Consonants ===
The consonantal inventory of Kỳikatêjê is as follows.

	labial	alveolar	palatal	velar	glottal
plosive	p	t	tʃ	k	
fricative					h
nasals	m	n			
oral sonorants	w	ɾ	j		

The stops /p k t/ are sometimes phonetically aspirated in coda: /pɨtit/ [pɨˈtitʰ] ‘one’. The approximant /j/ surfaces as [ʒ] preceding one of /ɨ̃ ĩ/, as in /mpɔ-jĩ/ [mpɔˈʒĩ] ‘meat’, /pa mũ jɨ̃/ [pamũˈʒɨ̃] ‘I sat down’. /n/ is optionally assimilated to [ŋ] before /k/, as in [ĩnkɾiˈɾɛ] ~ [ĩŋkɾiˈɾɛ] ‘small’. The voiced labial fricative and the glottal stop [ʔ] have been attested in one word each, [kuβeneˈɾɛ] ‘bird’ and [aʔə̃ˈɾɛ] ‘hen’.

Available complex onsets include /pɾ kɾ mp/ (and possibly others). The maximum syllable in Kỳikatêjê is /CCVC/.

=== Vowels ===
The vowel inventory of Kỳikatêjê is as follows.

	Oral			Nasal		
	Front	Central	Back	Front	Central	Back
Close	i	ɨ	u	ĩ	ɨ̃	ũ
Close-mid	e	ə	o	ẽ	ə̃	õ
Open-mid	ɛ	ɜ	ɔ			
Open		a				
