= Parkatêjê dialect =

Timbira variety of Brazil

Parkatêjê
- Pará Gavião
- Native to: Brazil
- Region: Pará
- Ethnicity: Parkatêjê
- Native speakers: 12 (2019)
- Language family: Macro-Jê: Jê; Cerrado; Jê of Goyaz; Northern Jê; Timbira; Pará Gavião; Parkatêjê

Language codes
- ISO 639-3: None (mis)
- Glottolog: timb1254

Parkatêjê, or Pará Gavião, is a Timbira variety of the Jê language family of Brazil. It is spoken by 12 individuals in Terra Indígena Mãe Maria (Bom Jesus do Tocantins, Pará). It is closely related to Kỳikatêjê, spoken by another Timbira group in the same reservation. Parkatêjê has been described and documented by Leopoldina Araújo and, more recently, by other researchers from the Federal University of Pará.

== Phonology ==
=== Consonants ===
Consonants of Parkatêjê
| | Bilabial | Alveolar | Palatal | Velar | Glottal |
|---|---|---|---|---|---|
| Plosive | p | t | | k | ʔ |
| Nasal | m | n | | | |
| Liquid | | ɾ | | | |
| Approximant | w | | j | | h |

Parkatêjê (and Kỳikatêjê) differ from all other Timbira varieties in lacking a contrast between /k/ and /kʰ/. Moreover, the glottal stop /ʔ/ in Parkatêjê may not occupy the coda position of a syllable, which Ribeiro-Silva (2020) attributes to loss of Proto-Timbira *ʔ in codas in Parkatêjê.

=== Vowels ===
Vowels of Parkatêjê
| | Front | | Central | | Back | |
| | plain | nasal | plain | nasal | plain | nasal |
|---|---|---|---|---|---|---|
| Close | i | ĩ | ɨ | ɨ̃ | u | ũ |
| Close-mid | e | ẽ | | | o | õ |
| Mid | | | ə | ə̃ | | |
| Open-mid | ɛ | | ɜ | | ɔ | |
| Open | | | a | | | |
