= Krĩkatí dialect =

Dialect of Timbirá

Krĩkatí
- Krinkati
- Native to: Brazil
- Region: Maranhão
- Ethnicity: Krĩkatí
- Language family: Macro-Jê: Jê; Cerrado; Jê of Goyaz; Northern Jê; Timbira; Pykobjê–Krĩkatí; Krĩkatí

Language codes
- ISO 639-3: xri
- Glottolog: krin1238

Krĩkatí (also Krinkati or Krikati) is a Timbira dialect of the Northern Jê language group (Jê, Macro-Jê) spoken by the Krĩkatí in Terra Indígena Krikati in Maranhão, Brazil. It is very closely related to Pykobjê, and Nimuendajú described Krĩkatí as "completely coincid[ing] with that of the Pukóbye”.

There is a Krĩkatí-Portuguese dictionary written by a New Tribes Mission missionary.

== Phonology ==
Krĩkatí is closely related to Pykobjê, but differs from it in lacking the velar nasal phoneme /ŋ/ (as in cahã ‘snake’, hõr ‘to sleep’, corresponding to Pykobjê cagã, gõr) as well as the fricative allophone of /j/ (which is realized as [s ~ ʃ] in the coda position in Pykobjê, but as [j] in Krĩkatí).
