= Jê peoples =

Family of ethnic groups mainly of Brazil

Total population
- 100.000

Regions with significant populations
- Brazil, Paraguay

Languages
- Jê languages, Portuguese

Religion
- Animism, Catholicism, Protestantism

Jê or Gê are the people who traditionally speak Jê languages of the northern South American Caribbean coast and Brazil. In Brazil, the Jê were found in Rio de Janeiro, Minas Gerais, Bahia, Piauí, Mato Grosso, Goiás, Tocantins, Maranhão, and as far south as Paraguay.

They include the Timbira, the Kayapó, and the Suyá of the northwestern Jê; the Xavante, the Xerente, and the Akroá of the central Jê; the Karajá; the Jeikó; the Kamakán; Maxakalí; the Guayaná; the Purí (Coroado); the Bororo (Boe); the Gavião, and others. The southern Jê include the Kaingang and the Xokleng.

The Tupi term "Tapuia", a designation for every non-Tupi native, was often used towards the Jê peoples both by the Tupi and Portuguese.

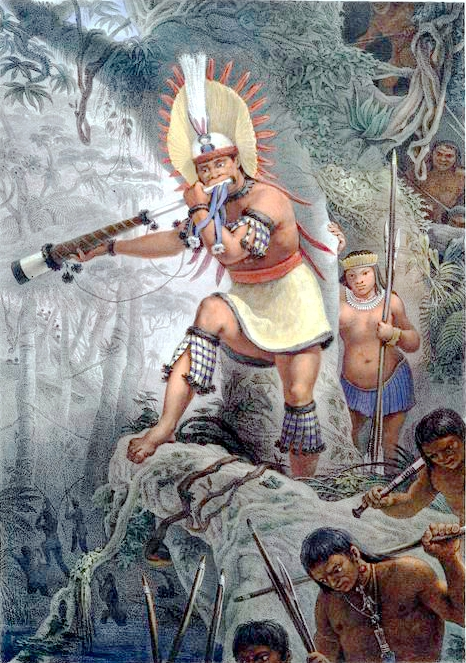
Coroados

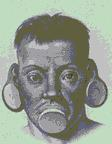
Botocudos

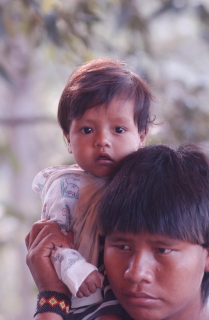
Xavantes

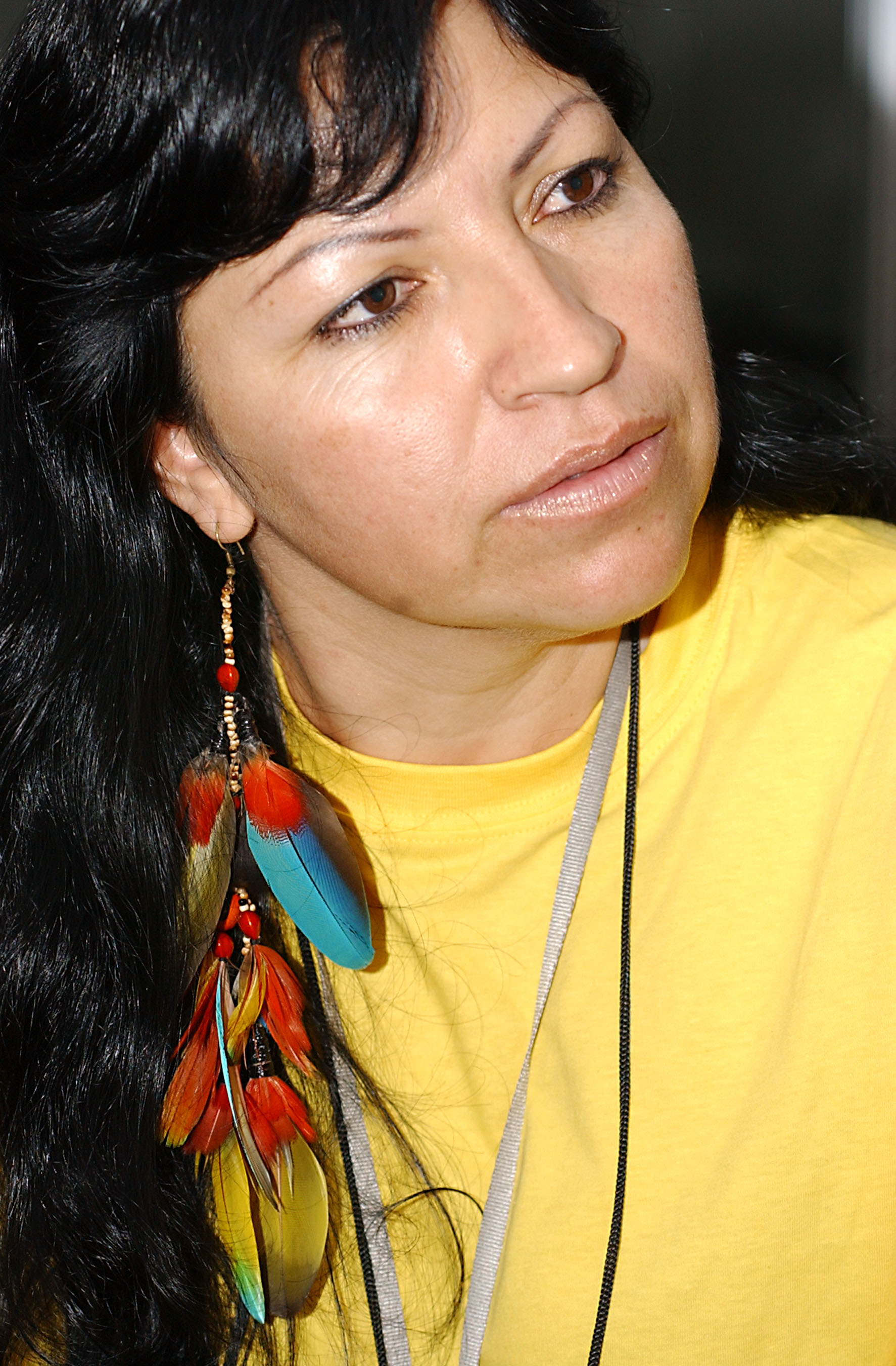
Kaingang

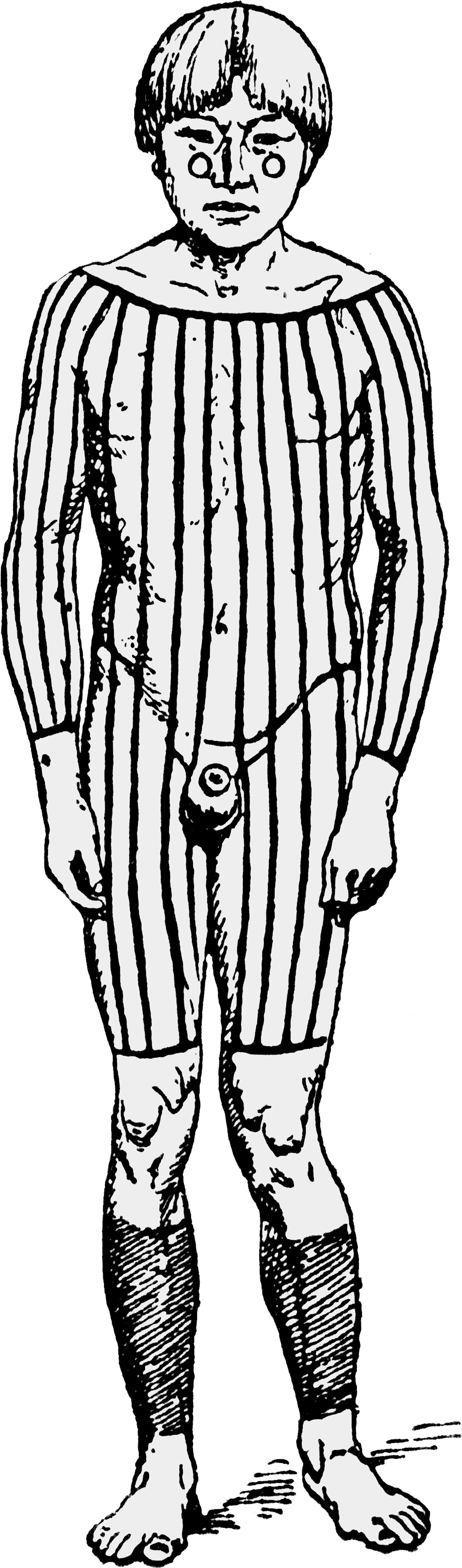
Karajá

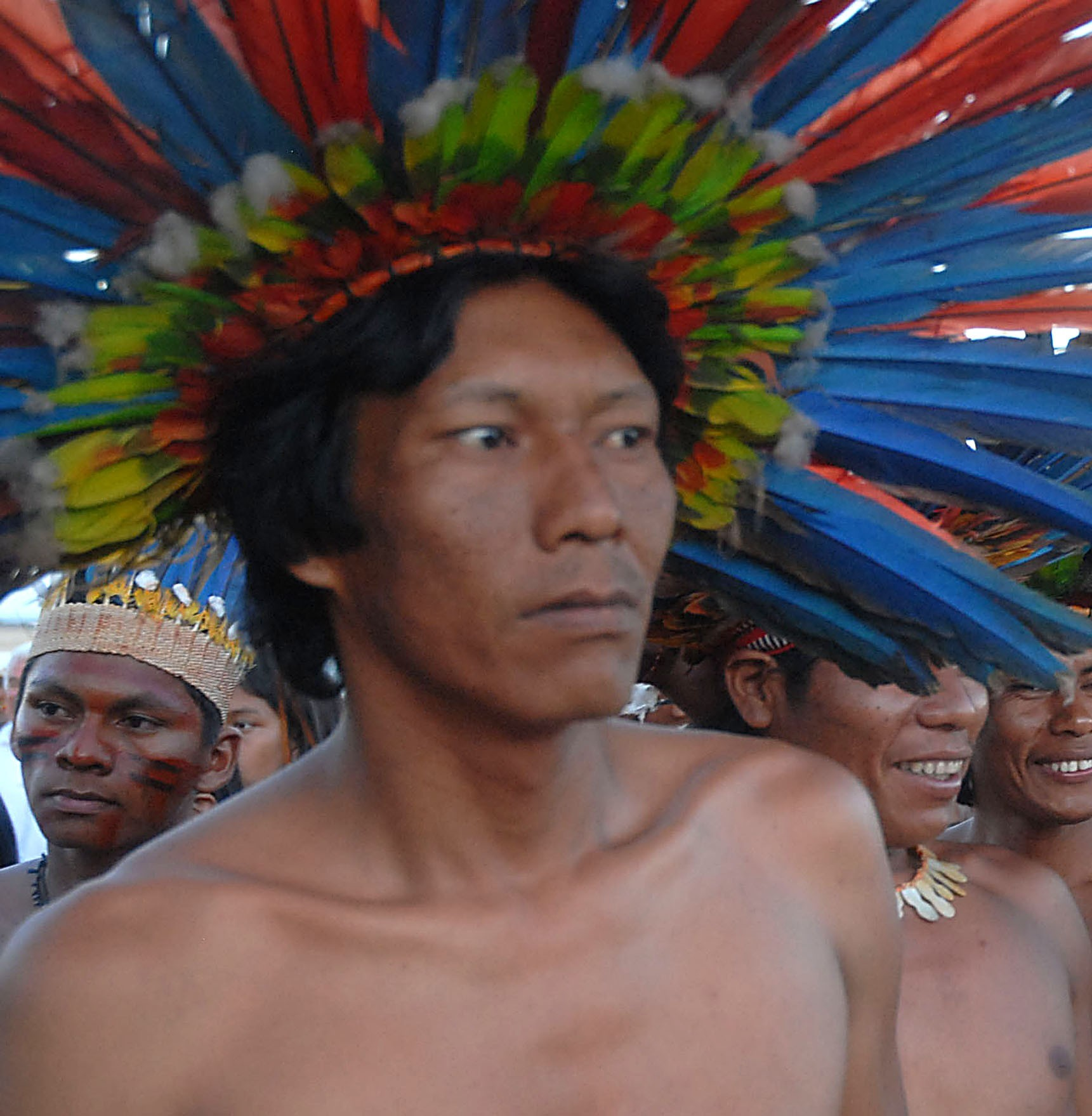
Bororo

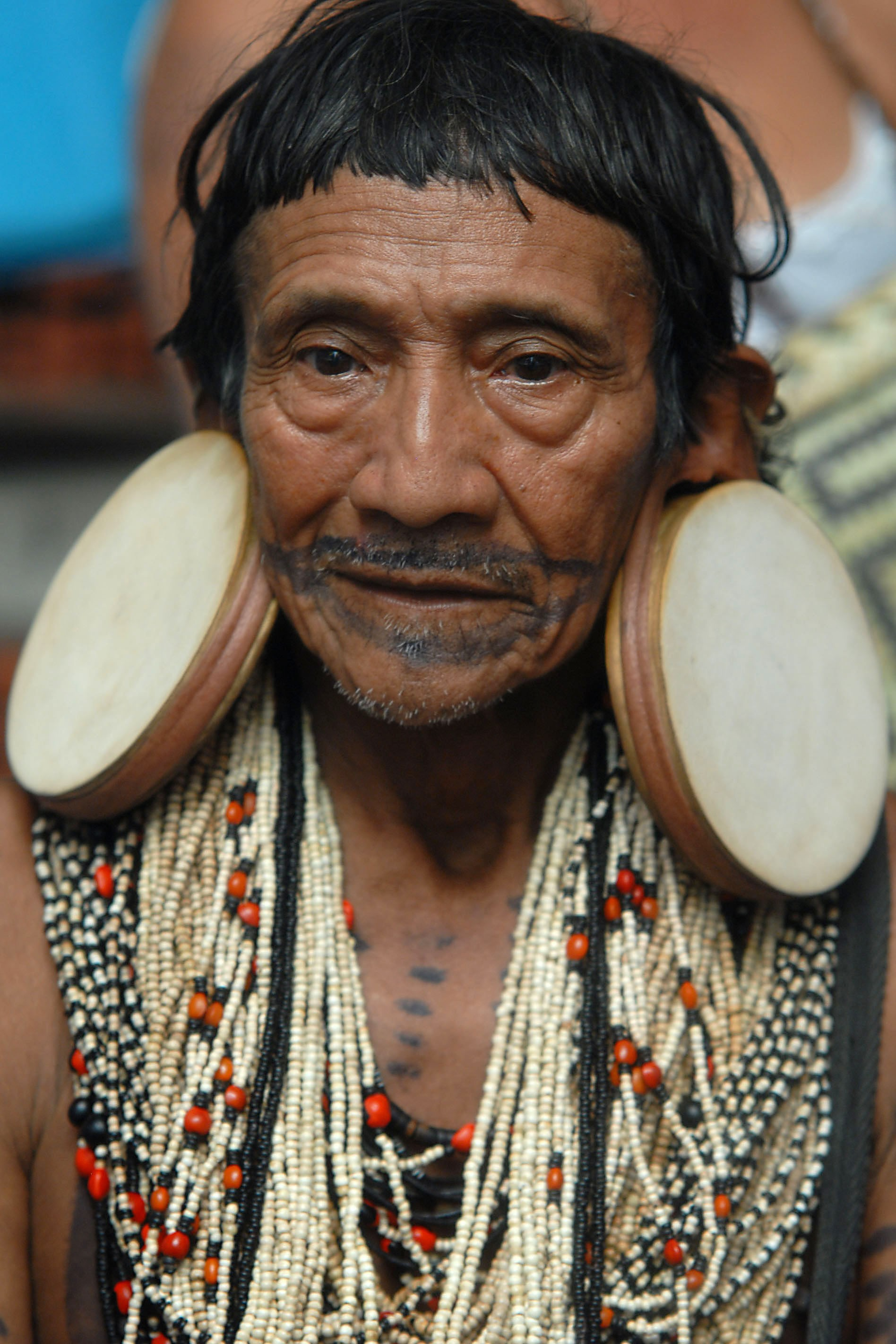
Rikbaktsa

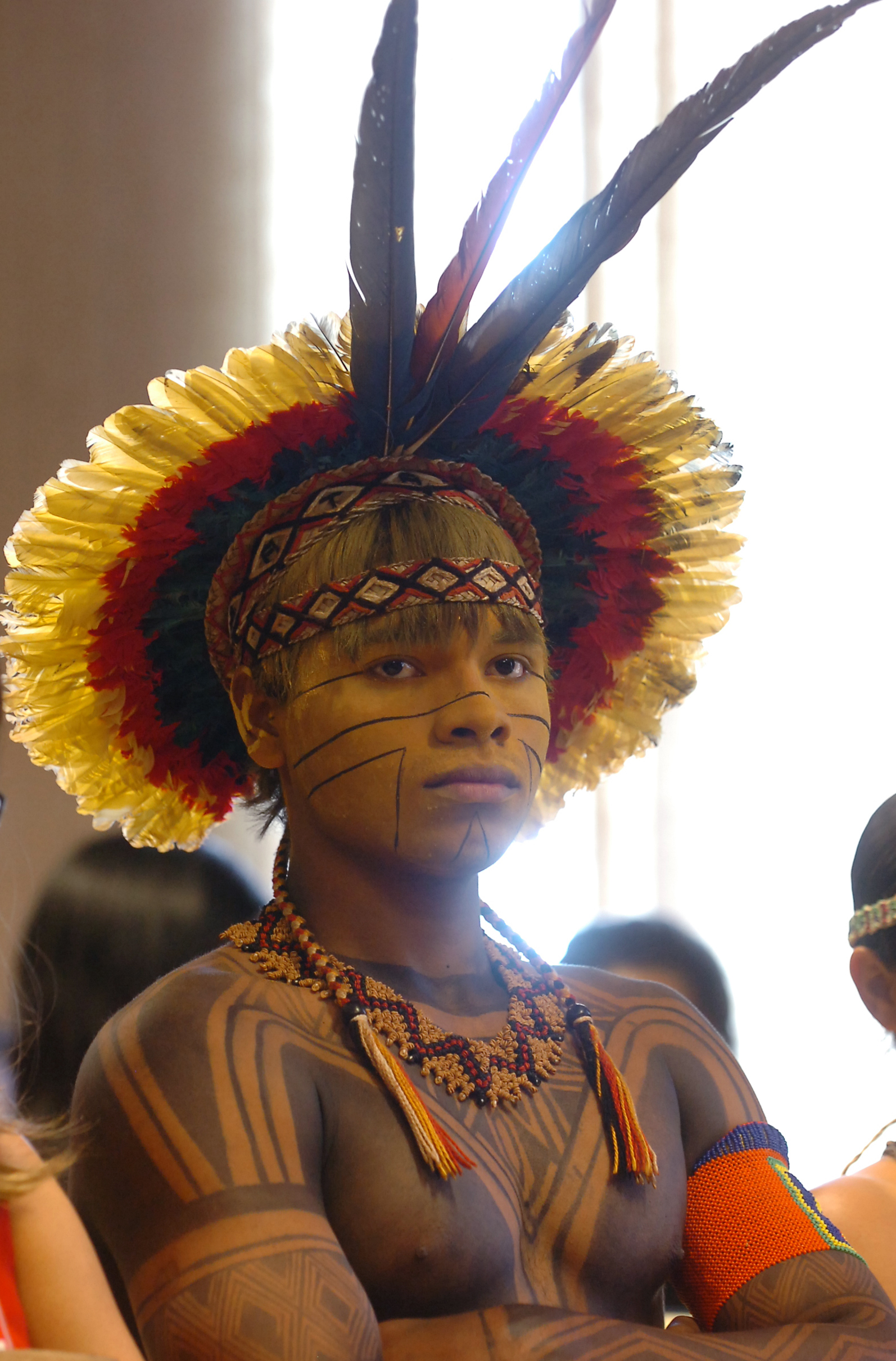
Pataxó

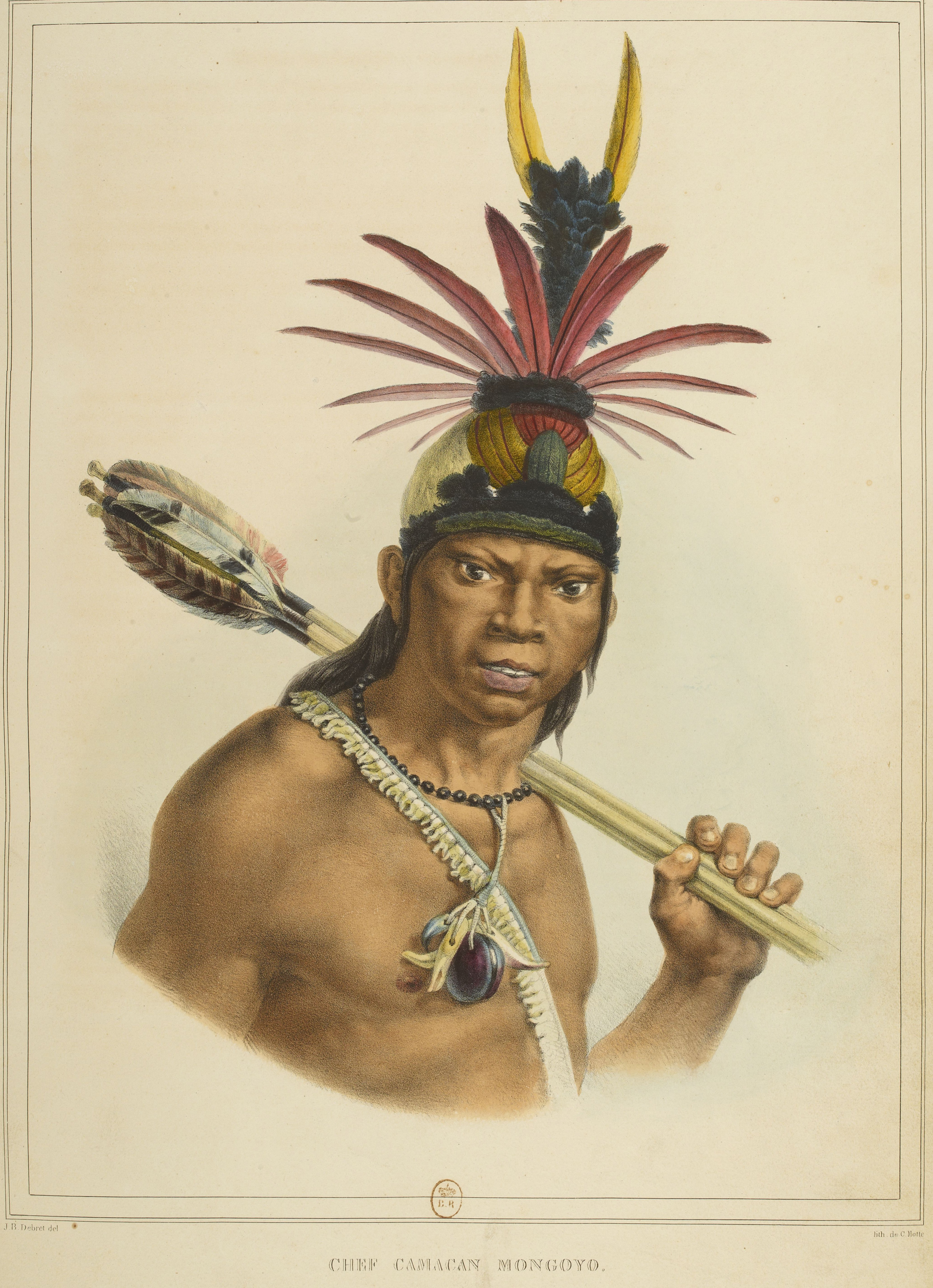
Camaçan

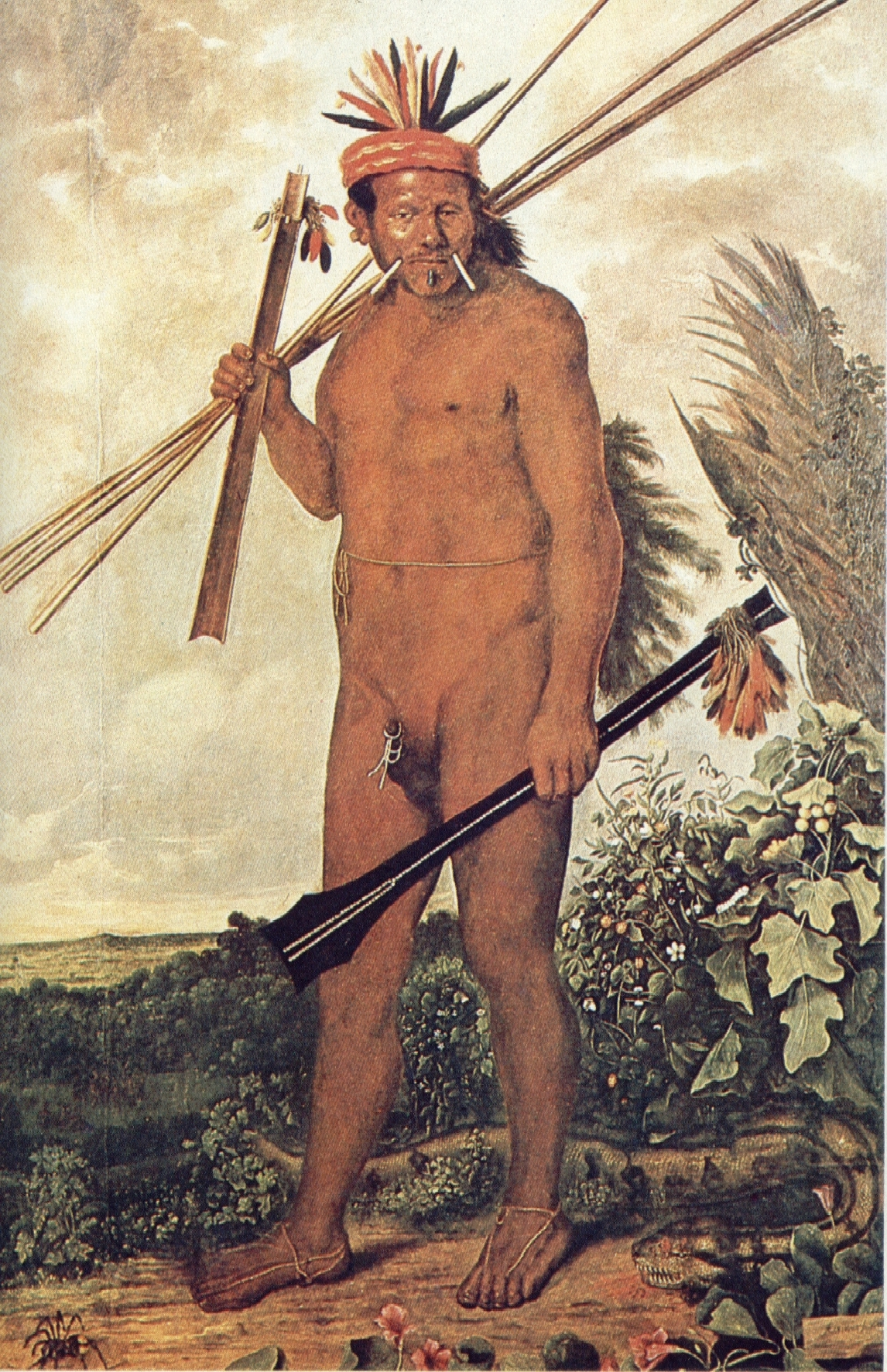
Tapuia

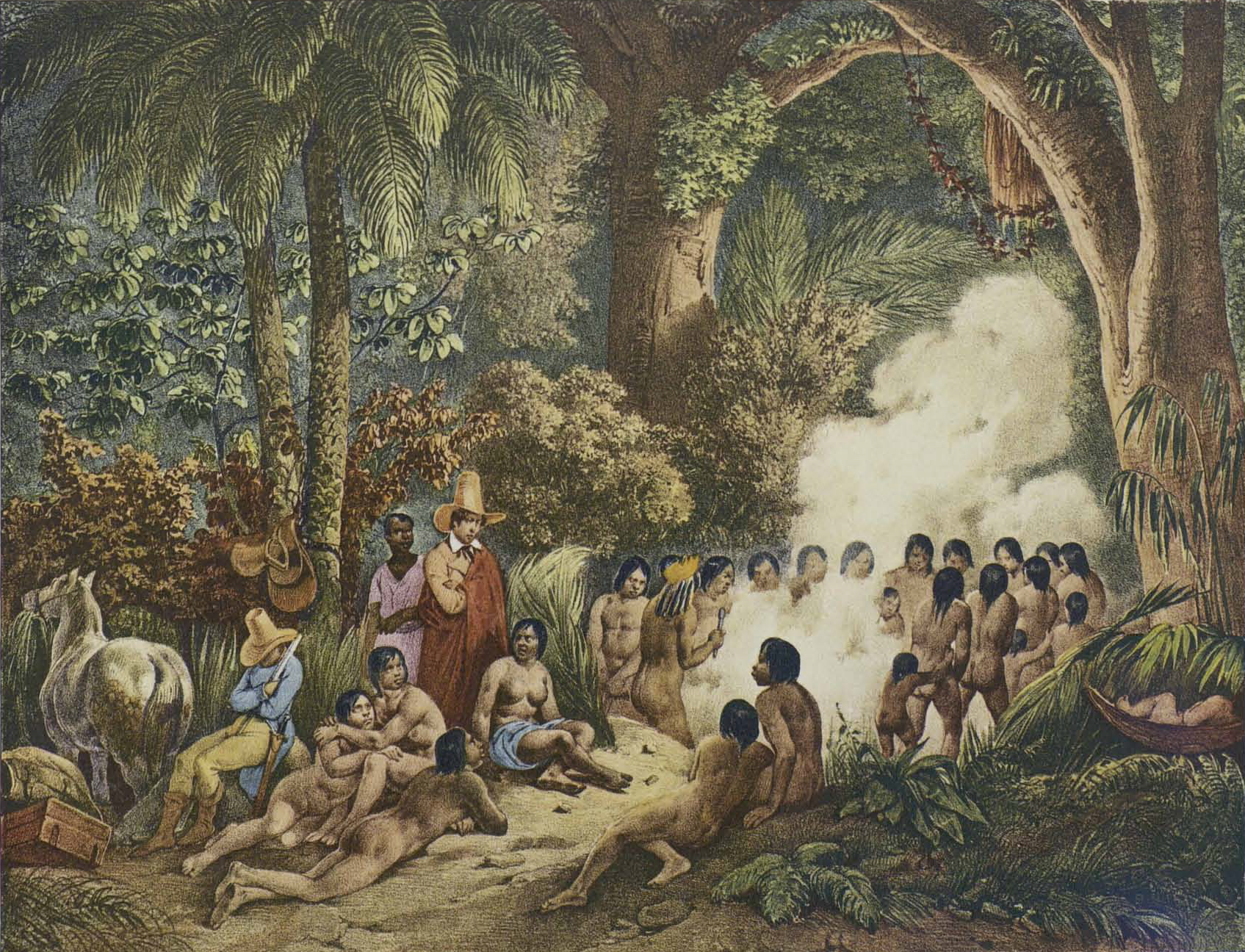
Puris
