= Pykobjê dialect =

Pará Gavião dialect of Brazil

Pykobjê
- Pykobjê-Gavião
- Native to: Brazil
- Region: Maranhão
- Ethnicity: Gavião
- Native speakers: 600 (2010)
- Language family: Macro-Jê: Jê; Cerrado; Jê of Goyaz; Northern Jê; Timbira; Pará Gavião; Pykobjê
- Dialects: Pykobjê; Krĩkatí

Language codes
- ISO 639-3: xri
- Glottolog: krik1239 Pykobjê krin1238 Krinkati
- ELP: Krikatí

Pykobjê (also Gavião-Pykobjê) Pykobjê-Gavião, Gavião, Pyhcopji, or Gavião-Pyhcopji) is a dialect of Pará Gavião, a Northern Jê language, spoken by the Gavião-Pykobjê people in Terra Indígena Governador close to Amarante, Maranhão, Brazil. It has also been stated to be a distinct language.

Krĩkatí (also Krinkati or Krikati) is spoken by the Krĩkatí people in Terra Indígena Krikati in Maranhão.

Pykobjê and Krĩkatí differ in that Pykobjê retains the velar nasal /ŋ/ of Proto-Timbira (spelt ⟨g⟩ in the orthography, as in cagã 'snake', gõr 'to sleep'), which Krĩkatí has replaced with /h/ (cahã, hõr), as well as in having a voiceless fricative allophone [s ~ ʃ] of /j/ (spelt ⟨x⟩, as in cas 'pacará basket', hõhmtyx 'his/her wrist'), which occurs in the coda position only and corresponds to [j] in all other Timbira varieties, including Krĩkatí.

There is a Krĩkatí-Portuguese dictionary by a New Tribes Mission missionary.

The remainder of this article describes Pykobjê specifically.

== Phonology ==
=== Consonants ===
		Labial	Alveolar	Palatal	Velar	Glottal
Nasal		m	n		ᵑɡ	
Stop	plain	p	t	t͡ʃ	k	ʔ
Stop	aspirated				kʰ	
Fricative			(s)	(ʃ)		h
Approximant		w		j		
Rhotic			r			

- Stops /p, t, k/ can be heard as voiced [b, d, ɡ] when in intervocalic positions or when preceding glide sounds /j, w/.
- Fricatives [s] and [ʃ] occur as allophones of /j/ when in coda position.

=== Vowels ===
	Oral			Nasal		
	Front	Central	Back	Front	Central	Back
Close	i iː	ɨ ɨː	u uː	ĩ	ɨ̃	ũ
Close-mid	e eː	ə əː	o oː	ẽ ẽː	ə̃	õ õː
Open-mid	ɛ ɛː		ɔ ɔː			
Open		a aː				

Breathy vowels
	Front		Central		Back	
	short	nasal	short	nasal	short	nasal
Close-mid	e̤	ẽ̤	ə̤	ə̤̃	o̤	õ̤
Open-mid	ɛ̤				ɔ̤	
Open			a̤			

== Morphology ==
=== Finiteness morphology ===
As in all other Northern Jê languages, verbs in Pykobjê inflect for finiteness and thus have a basic opposition between a finite (or short) form and a nonfinite (or long) form. Finite forms are used in matrix non-past clauses only, whereas nonfinite forms are used in all types of subordinate clauses as well as in some matrix clauses (such as past, negated or quantified). Nonfinite forms are most often formed via suffixation and/or prefix substitution. Some verbs (including all descriptives with the exception of cato ‘to leave, to arrive, to appear’, whose nonfinite form is cator) lack an overt finiteness distinction.

The following nonfinite suffixes have been attested: -r (the most common option, found in many transitive and intransitive verbs), -n (found in some transitive verbs), as well as -c, -m, and -x (found in a handful of intransitive verbs which take a nominative subject when finite).

Nonfinite suffixes in Pykobjê
finite	nonfinite	gloss
suffix -r
mo	mor	to go slowly
pẽh	-pẽhr	to extinguish
coh	-’cohr	to eat (a part)
cahu	cahur	to suck, to eat soft food
-’coohquehj	-’coohcjir	to ask
suffix -n
pe	-’pen	to drink up
pu	-pun	to untie
cwy	-’cwyn	to dig
-’coohpỳ	-’coohpỳn	to gnaw
-’coh’tu	-’coh’tun	to spit
suffix -c
tyh	-’tyhc	to die
ry	-ryc	to rain
suffix -m
tẽ	-’tẽm	to go (singular)
ẽhjcõ	-’cõm	to drink
xa	xãm	to stand (singular)
suffix -x
aacji	-ncjix	to enter (plural)

==== Prefix substitution or loss ====
In addition to the aforementioned processes, the finiteness inflection may involve prefix substitution or loss. For example, the valency-reducing prefixes are a(j)- (anticausative) and a(a)-, aw- (antipassive) in finite verb forms, but -pe(e)h-, -pẽh- and -jỳ-,/-jõh-, respectively, in the nonfinite forms. In addition, some verbs which denote physiological activities or movement have a prefix (ehj- and aa-, respectively) in their finite forms but not in the nonfinite form. Some examples are given below.

Finiteness and prefix alternations in Pykobjê
finite	nonfinite	gloss
anticausatives
axpa	-pehxpar	to grieve
axpoh	-pehxpoh	to fight
amteh	-pẽhmtehr	to dream
ampraa	-pẽhmpraa	to wake up
ajquẽ	-peehquẽn	to dance
ajcapu	-pehcapun	to split up in two
ajri	-peehrin	to get torn
antipassives
aapi	-jỳyhpin	to fish
aapi	-jỳyhpir	to blow (of wind)
aapỳ	-jỳyhpỳ	to eat
a’tip	-jỳ’tip	to come close
awjacu	-jõhjacur	to smoke
awjãarẽ	-jõhjãarẽn	to narrate
awjahi	-jõhjahir	to hunt
awcapeh	-jõhcapeh	to choose
awpa	-jõhpar	to be able to hear
awpỹ	-jõhpỹr	to be able to smell
awryh	-jõhwryh	to travel far away, to be far away
physiological verbs
ẽhjcõ	-’cõm	to drink
ẽhjtoh	-’tohr	to urinate
ẽhjcwỳ	-’cwỳr	to defecate
movement verbs
aajit	jit	to hang (singular)
aaxỳ	-xỳr	to enter (singular)
aacji	-ncjix	to enter (plural)

=== Derivational morphology ===
==== Productive affixes ====
Pykobjê widely uses the diminutive suffix -re and the augmentative suffix -teh, which may combine with nouns and descriptive predicates.

Instrumental/locative nominalizations are formed by means of the suffix -xỳ, which attached to the nonfinite forms of verbs.
