= Timbira =

Related peoples of Brazil

Mehím
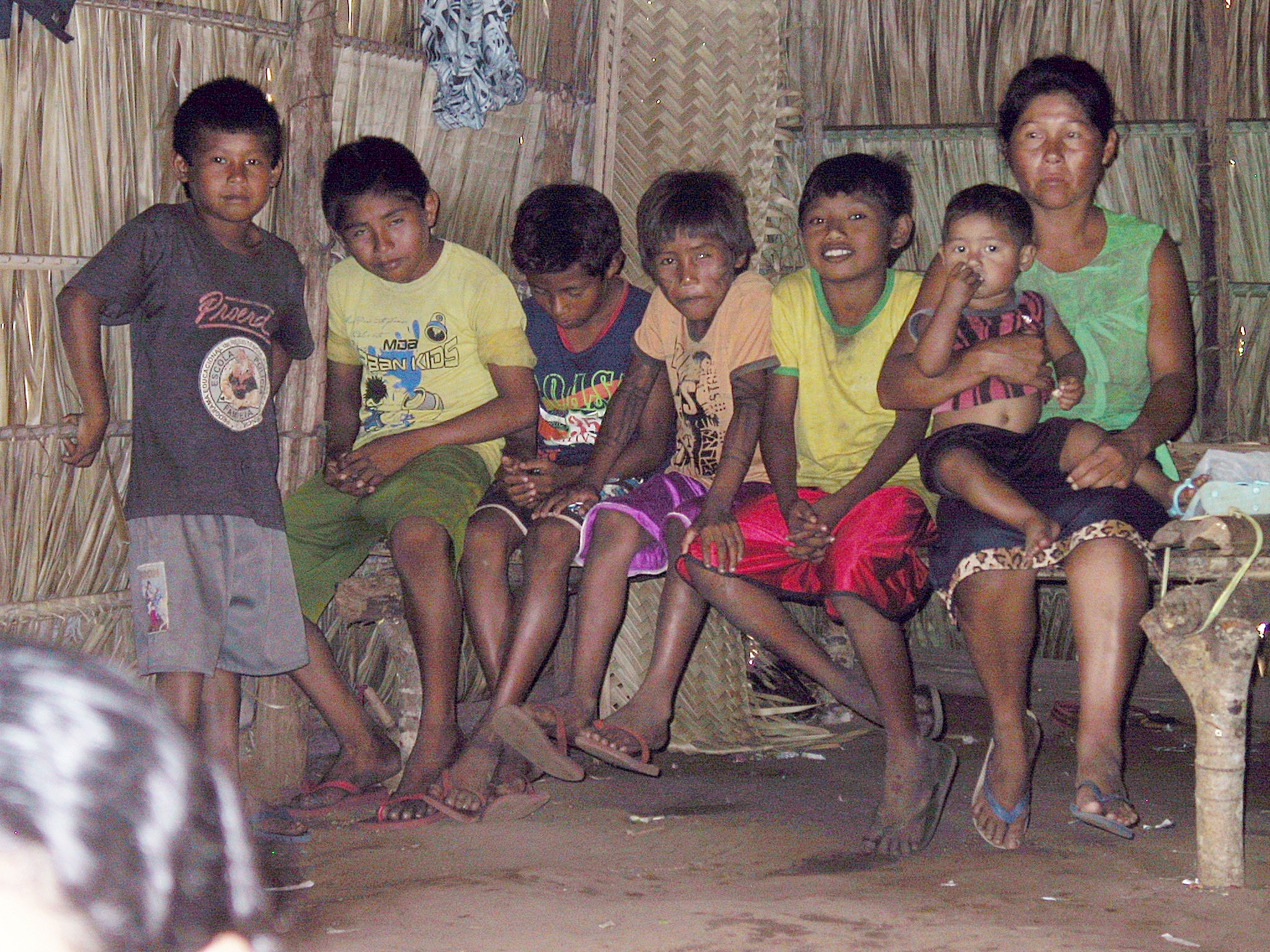
- Apinajé boys and woman

Languages
- Timbira language

The Timbira are a number of related ethnolinguistic groups of Timbira-speaking Gê peoples Native to Northern and Northeastern Brazil. Among those peoples grouped under the name are the Apanyekrá, Apinajé, Kanela, Gavião (Jê), Krahô, Krinkatí, and Pukobyê.
