= Gavião, Bahia =

Municipality of Bahia, Brazil

Coordinates: 11°28′15″S 39°47′02″W

Gavião
- Municipality
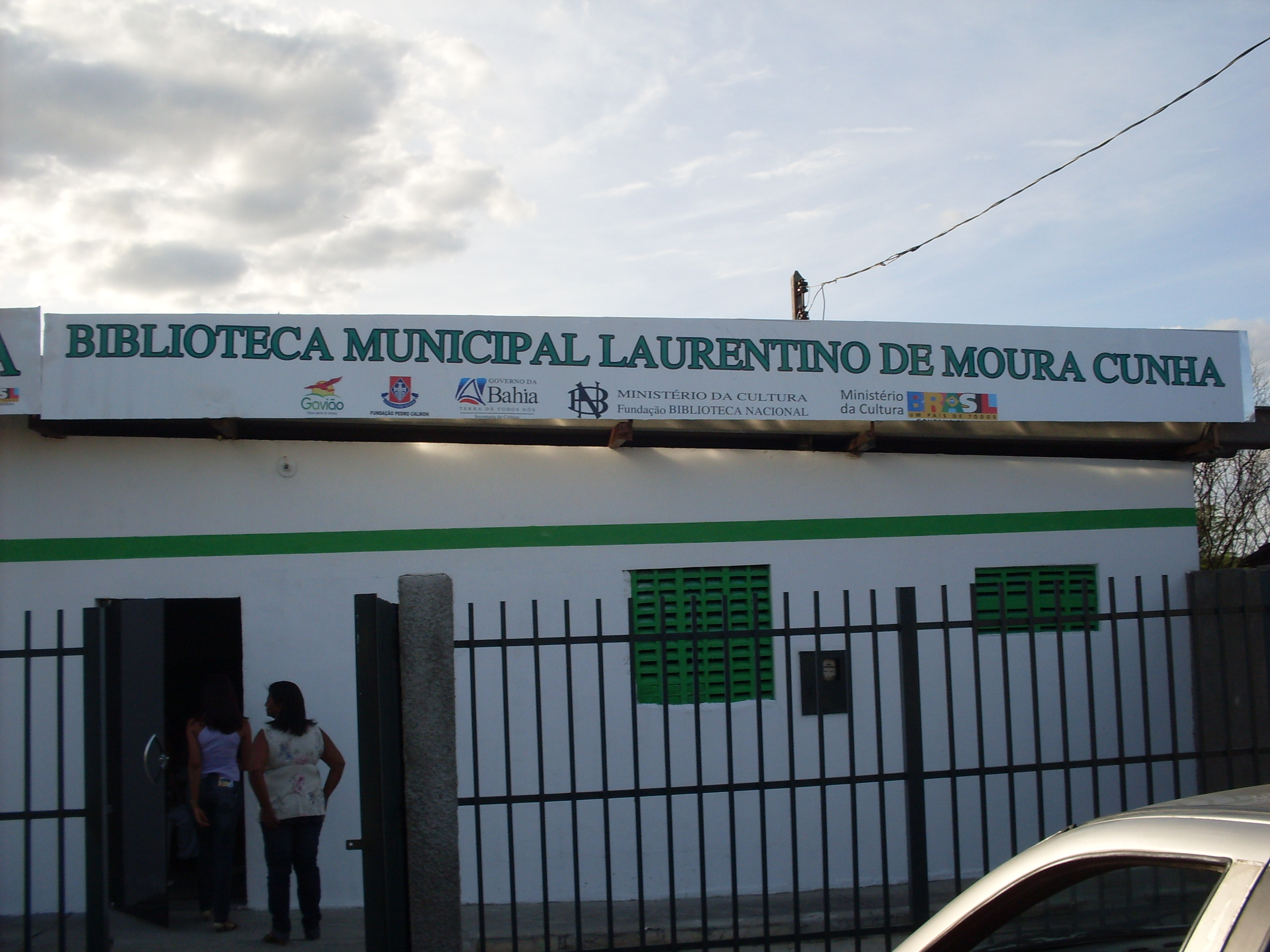

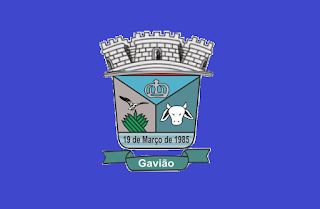
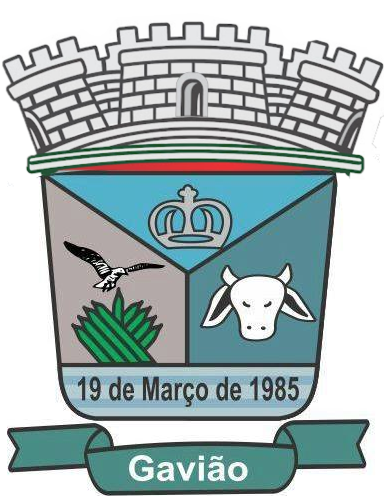
- Flag Coat of arms
- Interactive map of Gavião
- Country: Brazil
- Region: Nordeste
- State: Bahia

Population (2020)
  - Total: 4,440
- Time zone: UTC−3 (BRT)

Gavião is a municipality in the state of Bahia in the North-East region of Brazil.

== See also ==
- List of municipalities in Bahia
