= Amarante do Maranhão =

Coordinates: 5°36′S 46°45′W

- Municipality
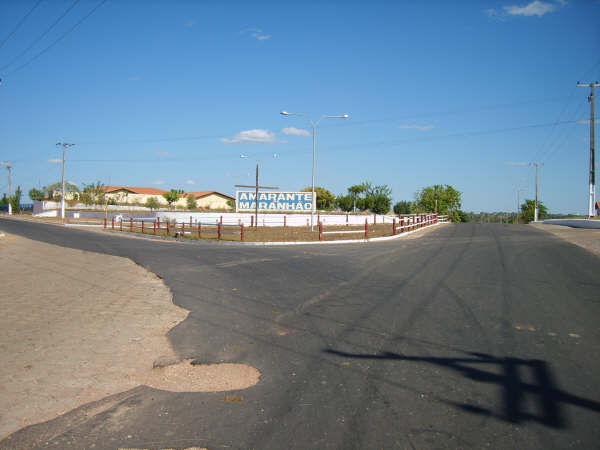

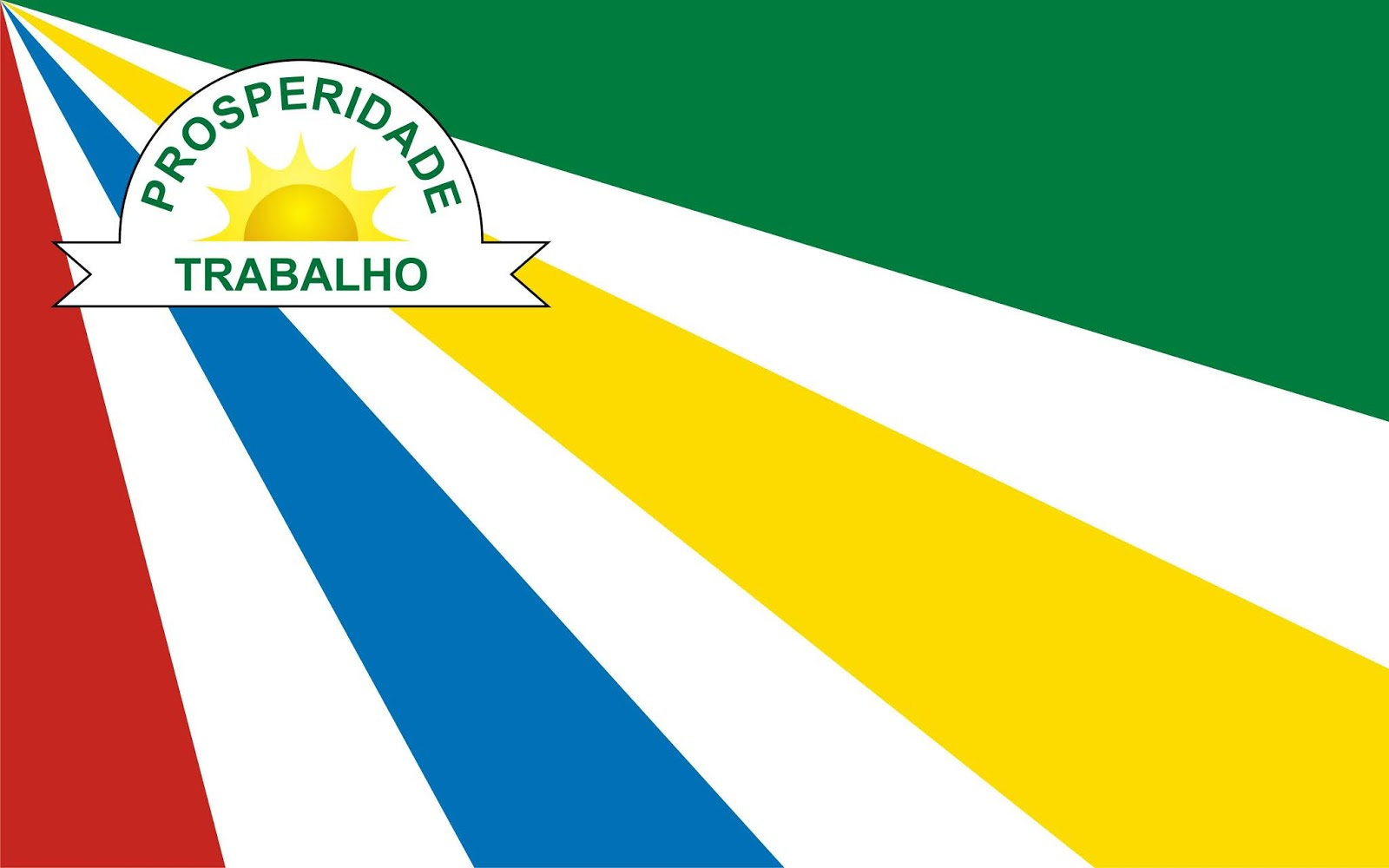
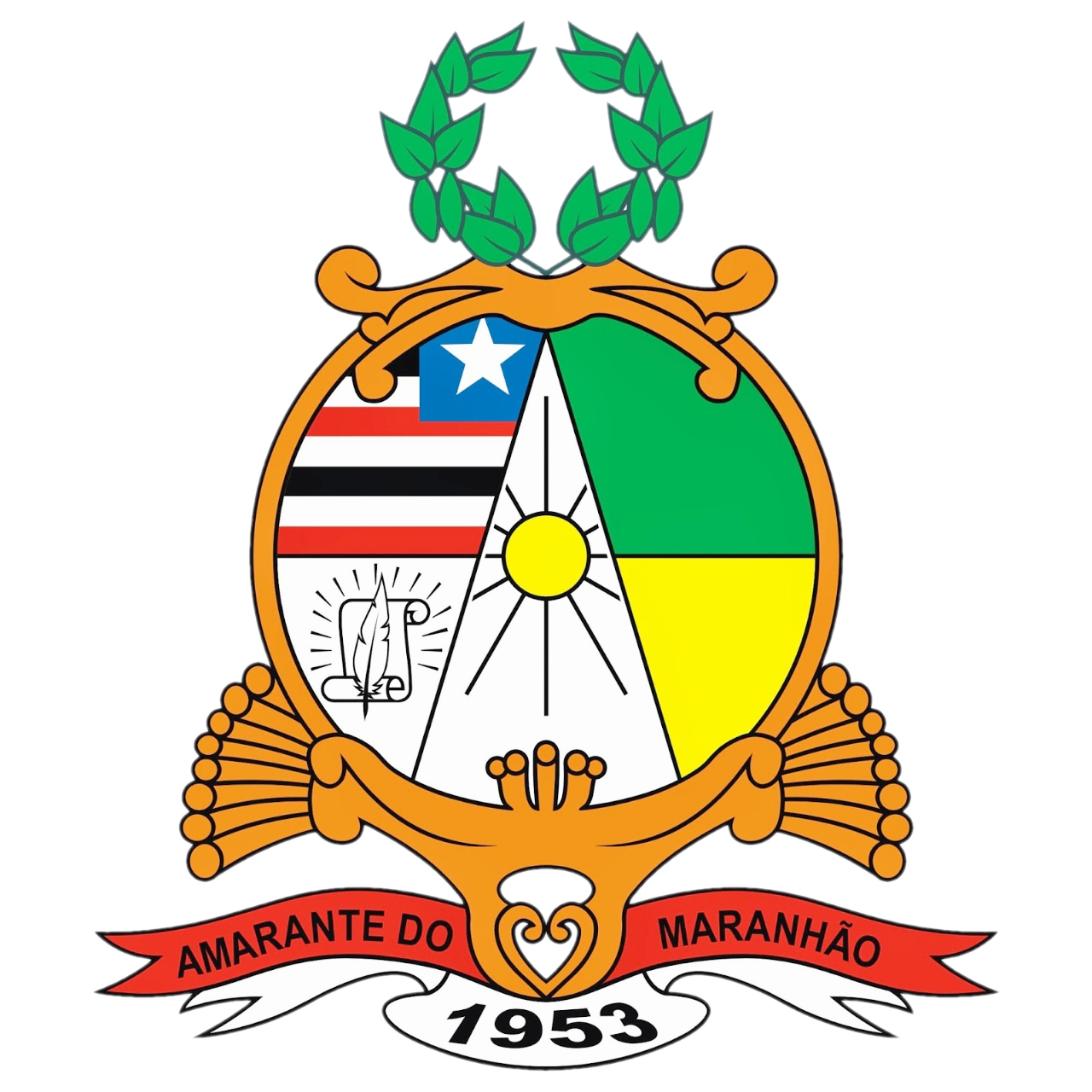
- Flag Coat of arms
- Interactive map of Amarante do Maranhão
- Country: Brazil
- Region: Nordeste
- State: Maranhão
- Mesoregion: Oeste Maranhense

Population (2020)
  - Total: 41,729
- Time zone: UTC−3 (BRT)

Amarante do Maranhão is a municipality in the state of Maranhão in the Northeast region of Brazil.

There are approximately 600 speakers of Pykobjê in Terra Indígena Governador, located close to the town of Amarante.

== See also ==
- List of municipalities in Maranhão
