= Northern Jê languages =

Indigenous languages of Brazil

Northern Jê
- Geographic distribution: Mato Grosso, Tocantins, Pará, Maranhão
- Linguistic classification: Macro-Jê: Jê; Cerrado; Jê of Goyaz; Northern Jê
- Subdivisions: Timbira (Canela, Krahô, Pykobjê, Krikati, Parkatêjê, Kỳikatêjê); Trans-Tocantins (Apinajé, Mẽbêngôkre, Kĩsêdjê, Tapayúna)

Language codes
- Glottolog: core1264

The Northern Jê or Core Jê languages (Portuguese: Jê Setentrionais) are a branch of the Jê languages constituted by the Timbira dialect continuum (which includes Canela, Krahô, Pykobjê, Krikati, Parkatêjê, and Kỳikatêjê) and a number of languages spoken to the west of the Tocantins River, the Trans-Tocantins languages Apinajé, Mẽbêngôkre, Kĩsêdjê, and Tapayúna. Together with Panará (and its predecessor, Southern Kayapó), they form the Goyaz branch of the Jê family.

The term Northern Jê has been sometimes used to refer to a broader group of languages, which also includes Panará and Southern Kayapó. In this article, the label Northern Jê is used in the narrow sense (that is, excluding Panará and Southern Kayapó).

== Phonology ==
The Northern Jê languages have been noted for their outstanding relation between the nasality vs. orality of the nuclei and the allophonic realization of the adjacent nasal consonants. In Apinajé and Kĩsêdjê, for instance, underlying nasal consonants surface as partially oral (for example, /m/ [mb]) if the nucleus of the syllable is oral; this allophony pattern has been characterized by Wetzels and Nevins (2018) as nasal shielding.

All Northern Jê languages have similar phonotactic restrictions. Typically, the maximal syllable is CRWVC, where C stands for a consonant, R for a rhotic (typically /ɾ/), W for a glide (/w j/), and V for a vowel. Several additional co-occurrence restrictions apply: only /p m k ŋ/ may form a complex onset with a rhotic, /j/ never follows coronals (i.e., clusters such as ˣ/nj/, ˣ/cj/ or ˣ/pɾj/ are not permitted; */tj/ is reconstructed for Proto-Northern Jê but is not preserved in any contemporary language), and /w/ never follows labials (i.e., */pw pɾw mw bw ww/ are ruled out). In specific languages, some of these restrictions have been altered due to sound change. For example, Kĩsêdjê has lost Proto-Northern Jê */pɾ/ for hr [hɺ] through debuccalization. In Apinajé, the fricatives /v z/ replaced the earlier glides */w j/, resulting in the inversion of the order of the elements in the triconsonantal clusters from CRW to CWR (e.g. */kɾw/ > /kvɾ/), which has been attributed to the different treatment of glides and fricatives by the Sonority Sequencing Principle. The Timbira varieties only have CRVC and CWVC, but not *CRWVC.

=== Consonants ===
==== Onsets ====
The inventory of Proto-Northern Jê onsets (including complex onsets) is reconstructed as follows. Note that underlying nasals acquired an oral phrase preceding an oral nucleus (this is preserved in all Northern Jê languages with the exception of Mẽbêngôkre, which no longer has the postoralized allophones of the underlying nasal stops). Conversely, the underlying voiced stops */ĵ/ and */g/ were nasalized to *[ɲ] and *[ŋ] preceding nasal nuclei.

	labial	labial + rhotic	dentialveolar	palatal	velar	velar + rhotic
voiceless stops	*/p/ *[p]	*/pɾ/ *[pɾ]	*/t/ *[t]	*/c/ *[c]	*/k/ *[k]	*/kɾ/ *[kɾ]
voiced stops	*/b/ *[b]		(*/d/ *[d])	*/ɟ/ (nasal *[ɲ], oral & stressed *[ɟ], oral & unstressed *[j])	*/g/ (nasal *[ŋ], oral *[g])	
nasal stops	*/m/ (nasal *[m], oral *[mb])	*/mɾ/ (nasal *[mɾ], oral *[mbɾ])	*/n/ (nasal *[n], oral *[nd])	*/ɲ/ (nasal —, oral *[ɲɟ])	*/ŋ/ (nasal *[ŋ], oral *[ŋg])	*/ŋɾ/ (nasal *[ŋɾ], oral *[ŋgɾ])
sonorants	*/w/ *[w]		*/ɾ/ *[ɾ]	*/j/ *[j]		

Specific Northern Jê languages innovated in multiple ways with respect to the reconstructed inventory. For example, the Timbira languages, Apinajé and the Tapajós languages coincide in no longer employing the feature [voice] (in most cases, however, the oppositions present in Proto-Northern Jê have been preserved by introducing contrastive aspirated consonants). In the Tapajós languages, the palatal stops were dentalized, whereas the original dentialveolar consonants acquired considerable retraction. In addition, Tapayúna got rid of all labial consonants.

The following table shows the usual reflexes of the Proto-Northern Jê onsets in the individual languages. The reconstructions are cited after Nikulin & Salanova (2019) in the Macro-Jê alphabet, whereas for the reflexes in the contemporary languages the official orthographies in use by the respective language communities are preferred. The underlying representations are given in the International Phonetic Alphabet.

Northern Jê onsets
Proto-Northern Jê	Mẽbêngôkre	Kĩsêdjê	Tapayúna	Apinajé	Parkatêjê	Canela, Krahô, Pykobjê	Krikati
*p */p/	p /p/	hw /hʷ/, h /h/, w /w/	hw /hʷ/, h /h/, w /w/	p /p/	p /p/		
*mb */m/	m /m/	mb /m/	w /w̃/	m /m/	mp /mp/, p /p/		
*m */m/	m /m/	m /m/	w /w̃/	m /m/	m /m/		
*pr */pɾ/	pr /pɾ/	hr /hɺ/	hr /hɾ/	pr /pɾ/	pr /pɾ/		
*mbr */mɾ/	mr /mɾ/	mbr /mɺ/	nr /ɾ̃/	mr /mɾ/	mpr /mpɾ/, pr /pɾ/		
*mr */mɾ/	mr /mɾ/	mr /mɺ/	nr /ɾ̃/	mr /mɾ/	mr /mɾ/		
*b */b/	b /b/	p /p/, w /w/	w /w/	p /p/	p /p/		
*w */w/	w /w/	w /w/	w /w/	w /v/	w /w/		
*t */t/	t /t/	th /t̠ʰ/	th /t̠ʰ/	t /t/	t /t/		
*nd */n/	n /n/	nd /n/	nd ~ n /n/	n /n/	nt /nt/, t /t/		
*n */n/	n /n/	n /n/	n /n/	n /n/	n /n/		
*d */d/	∅ /∅/	r /ɺ/, nd /n/, t /t̪/	r /ɾ/, t /t̪/	∅ /∅/, t /t/	t /t/		
*r */ɾ/	r /ɾ/	r /ɺ/	r /ɾ/	r /ɾ/	r /ɾ/		
*c */c/	∅ /∅/	s /s/	t /t̪/	∅ /∅/	h /h/, ∅ /∅/		
*nĵ */ɲ/	nh /ɲ/	j /ɲ/	nt ~ nd /ⁿt/	nh /ɲ/	nx /ntʃ/ (C, Pb, Kk, Pt), /nts/ (Kh); x /tʃ/ (C, Pb, Kk, Pt), /ts/ (Kh)		
*ñ */ɟ/	nh /ɲ/	nh /ɲ/	nh /ɲ/	nh /ɲ/	j /j/		
*ĵ */ɟ/	dj /dʒ/	t /t̪/	t /t̪/	x /tʃ/	x /tʃ/ (C, Pb, Kk, Pt), /ts/ (Kh)		
*j */ɟ/, */j/	j /j/	j /ɲ/	j /j/	j /z/	j /j/		
*k */k/	k /k/	kh /kʰ/	kh /kʰ/	k /k/	k /k/	c/qu (C, Kh), k (Pb) /kʰ/	c/qu /kʰ/
*ŋg */ŋ/	ng /ŋ/	ng /ŋ/	ng /ŋ/	ng /ŋ/	nk /nk/	nc/nqu /nk/, c/qu /k/	
*ŋ */ŋ/, */g/	ng /ŋ/	ng /ŋ/	ng /ŋ/	ng /ŋ/	h /h/	g /ŋ/	h /h/
*kr */kɾ/	kr /kɾ/	khr /kʰɺ/, kh /kʰ/	khr /kʰɾ/, kh /kʰ/	kr /kɾ/	kr /kʰɾ/	kr /kʰɾ/	
*ŋgr */ŋɾ/	ngr /ŋɾ/	ngr /ŋɺ/	nghr /ŋɾ/	ngr /ŋɾ/	nkr /nkɾ/	ncr /nkɾ/, cr /kɾ/	
*ŋr */ŋɾ/	ngr /ŋɾ/	ngr /ŋɺ/	nghr /ŋɾ/	ngr /ŋɾ/	r /ɾ/		
*g */g/	g /g/	k /k/	k /k/	k /k/	k /k/	c/qu /k/	

==== Codas ====
In all Northern Jê languages, the syllables may be either open or closed. The maximum number of consonants in the coda position is one (that is, only simplex codas are allowed). The nasal codas which follow oral nuclei may be subject to nasal shielding in some languages, whereby the initial phase of the nasal consonant is oralized, as in Apinajé /om/ [ˈobm] ‘its powder’.

In most (if not all) Northern Jê languages, codas may be followed by epenthetic vowels called echo vowels. Most commonly, the echo vowels are exact copies of the nuclei, but some nuclei (especially /a/) may trigger height dissimilation of the echo vowels; in addition, codas may influence the quality of the echo vowels (details vary from language to language). In the Tapajós languages Kĩsêdjê and Tapayúna, the echo vowels are represented orthographically; in Mẽbêngôkre, the echo vowels are written out only after r, whereas in the remaining languages the echo vowels are not reflected in writing.

The inventory of Proto-Northern Jê codas comprised nine phonemes, whose reflexes in the daughter languages are shown below. The character V stands for the echo vowels whose quality is a precise copy of the respective nucleus. For the Tapajós languages Kĩsêdjê and Tapayúna, which represent the echo vowels orthographically, both possibilities (without and with the echo vowel) are given, separated by a slash.

Northern Jê codas
Proto-Northern Jê	Mẽbêngôkre	Kĩsêdjê		Tapayúna	Apinajé	Parkatêjê, Canela, Krahô, Krikati	Pykobjê
Proto-Northern Jê	Mẽbêngôkre	V_	Ṽ_	Tapayúna	Apinajé	Parkatêjê, Canela, Krahô, Krikati	Pykobjê
*p */p/	p	p / wV p / wy (after /a/)	m / mV	p / wV	p	p	
*m */m/	m ~ p	m / my	m / mV	p / wV	m	m	
*t */t/	t	t / rV t / ri (after /a/)	n / nV	t / rV	t	t	
*n */n/	n ~ t	n / ni	n / nV	t / rV	n	n	
*r */ɾ/	rV ri (after a; in nouns also after o, à)	rV j / ji (after /a/; in nouns also after o, á)	rV	rV j (after /a/; in nouns also after o, à)	r	r	
*c */c/	x ~ j	t / rV t / ri (after a, e)	nV / rV n / ni (after ẽ)	t / rV t / ri (after e)	x	j	x
*ñ */ɲ/	nh ~ j	n / ni	nV / rV n / ni (after ẽ)	j	nh	n	
*j */j/	j	j / ji		j	j	j	
*k */k/	k	k / kV k / ky (after /a/)		k / kV	k	k (Pt), c (C, Kh, Kk, P) /k/	

=== Nuclei ===
The inventory of Proto-Northern Jê monophthongs is reconstructed as follows.

oral			nasal		
*i */i/	*y */ɨ/	*u */u/	*ĩ */ĩ/	*ỹ */ɨ̃/	(*ũ */ũ/)
*ê */e/	*ə̂ */ɘ/	*ô */o/			
*e */ɛ/	*ə */ɜ/	*o */ɔ/	*ẽ */ɛ̃/	*ə̃ */ɜ̃/	*õ */ɔ̃/
	*a */a/			(*ã */ã/)	

In addition, six complex nuclei can be reconstructed, of which three are falling (*/ɨwă/, */uwă/, */ijă/, represented by Nikulin & Salanova (2019) as *ŷ, *û, *î) and three are raising (*/wa/, */ja/, */je/).

The following table shows the usual reflexes of the Proto-Northern Jê nuclei in the individual languages. The reconstructions are cited after Nikulin & Salanova (2019) in the Macro-Jê alphabet as well as in the International Phonetic Alphabet. For the reflexes in the contemporary languages, the official orthographies in use by the respective language communities have been preferred.

Northern Jê nuclei
Proto-Northern Jê	Mẽbêngôkre	Kĩsêdjê	Tapayúna	Apinajé	Parkatêjê	Canela, Krahô	Pykobjê, Krikati
*a */a/	a	a	a	a	a	a	a
*ə */ɜ/	à	á	à	à	à	à	ỳ
*ə̂ */ɘ/	ỳ	â	â	ỳ	ỳ	ỳ	y
*y */ɨ/	y	y	y	y	y	y	ỳh
*ŷ */ɨwă/	y	yp / ywy	yp / ywy	yw	uw, ow	uw, ow	ohw, ow
*o */ɔ/	o	o	o	o	o	o	o
*ô */o/	ô	ô	ô, (w)â	ô, (w)â	ô	ô	u
*u */u/	u	u	u	u	u	u	oh
*û */uwă/	uwa	?	uwa	uw ~ ur	uw, ow	uw, ow	ohw, ow
*wa */wa/	wa	wa	wa	wa	wa	wa	wa
*wə̂ */wɘ/	wỳ	wâ	wâ	wỳ	wỳ	wỳ	wy
*e */ɛ/	e	e	e	e	e	e	e
*ê */e/	ê	ê	ê	ê	ê	ê	i
*i */i/	i	i	i	i	i	i	eh
*î */ijă/	ija	ija	ija	ij ~ ir	ij	ij	ehj
*jê */je/	jê	jê	jê	jê	jê	jê	ji
*ã */ã/	ã ~ a	ã	ã	ã	ã ~ a	ã ~ a	ã
*ə̃ */ɜ̃/	ã	ã	ã	ã	ã	ã	ỹ
*ỹ */ɨ̃/	ỹ	ỹ	ỹ	ỹ	ỹ	ỹ	ỹh
*õ */ɔ̃/	õ	õ	õ	õ	õ	õ	õ
*ũ */ũ/	ũ	ũ	ũ	ũ	ũ	ũ	õh
*ẽ */ɛ̃/	ẽ	ẽ	ẽ	ẽ	ẽ	ẽ	ẽ
*ĩ */ĩ/	ĩ	ĩ	ĩ	ĩ	ĩ	ĩ	ẽh

== Morphology ==
=== Finiteness morphology ===
In all Northern Jê languages verbs inflect for finiteness and thus have a basic opposition between a finite form and a nonfinite form. Finite forms are used in matrix clauses only, whereas nonfinite forms are used in all types of subordinate clauses as well as in some matrix clauses (at least in some languages). Nonfinite forms are most often formed via suffixation and/or prefix substitution. Some verbs (including all descriptives with the exception of *kato ‘to exit’, whose nonfinite form is *kator) lack an overt finiteness distinction.

For the protolanguage, five nonfinite suffixes have been reconstructed: *-r (the most common option, found in many transitive and intransitive verbs), *-ñ (found in some transitive verbs), as well as *-k, *-m, and *-c (found in a handful of intransitive verbs which take a nominative subject when finite).

Nonfinite suffixes in Proto-Northern Jê
finite	nonfinite	gloss
suffix *-r
*mõ	*mõr	to go (plural)
*bĩ	*bĩr	to kill (singular)
*krẽ	*krẽr	to eat (singular)
*karê	*karêr	to weed
*japrô	*japrôr	to take away
suffix *-ñ
*põ	*põñ	to rub
*kê	*kêñ	to grate
*kwỹr	*kwỹñ	to break
*kumbə	*kumbəñ	to gnaw
*kaĵô	*kaĵôñ	to tear
suffix *-k
*ty	*tyk	to die
*rû	*rwə̂k	to descend
suffix *-m
*tẽ	*tẽm	to go (singular)
*ijkõ	*kõm	to drink
*ĵa	*ĵãm	to stand (singular)
suffix *-c
*aŋgî	*ŋgjêc	to enter (plural)

In a handful of verbs, all of which end in an underlying stop, the nonfinite form does not receive any overt suffixes, but it is nevertheless distinct from the finite form because the latter lenites the stem-final consonant (*-t, *-c, *-k → *-r, *-j, *-r).

Nonfinite suffixes in Proto-Northern Jê
finite	nonfinite	gloss
*tjêr	*tjêt	to burn
*ŋõr	*ñõt	to sleep
*bôj	*bôc	to arrive
*do=pôj	*do=pôc	to extract (plural)
*kar	*kak	to cough
*pôr	*pôk	to burn, to ignite
*jarkjêr	*jarkjêk	to yawn

==== Palatalizing prefix ====
A small set of verbs form their nonfinite forms by employing one of the aforementioned processes and a morphophonological process whereby the onset of the stressed syllable becomes palatal, and the nucleus of the stressed syllable is raised (if possible); this has been attributed to the influence of an underlying palatalizing nonfinite prefix.

Palatalizing prefix in Proto-Northern Jê
finite	nonfinite	gloss
*kaba	*kaĵər	to extract (singular)
*ga	*ĵər	to roast (singular)
*kuto (pl. jato)	*kucôñ (pl. jacôñ)	to ignite
*twə̂ *kaˀtwə̂	*cûk *kaˀcûk	to grind, to pound to grind, to pound, to press against a surface
*kaˀte	*kaˀcêk	to break into pieces
*kujate	*kujacêk	to push, to move away
*ŋõr	*ñõt	to sleep
*ŋõ	*ñõr	to give
*-ˀtĩ	*-ˀcĩk	to plait, to braid
*aˀtĩ	*jəˀcĩk	to sneeze
*(krə̃)ˀta	*(krə̃)ˀcyr	to cut off (singular)
*c-anẽ	*c-añỹr	to do so, to say so

==== Prefix substitution or loss ====
In addition to the aforementioned processes, the finiteness inflection may involve prefix substitution or loss. For example, the valency-reducing prefixes are *a(j)- (anticausative) and *a(p)- (antipassive) in finite verb forms, but *bi(t)- and *jə-/*ju-, respectively, in the nonfinite forms. In addition, some verbs which denote physiological activities or movement have a prefix (*ij- and *a-, respectively) in their finite forms but not in the nonfinite form.

Finiteness and prefix alternations in Proto-Northern Jê
finite	nonfinite	gloss
anticausatives
*ajkaˀte	*bikaˀcêk	to break (anticausative)
*ajkamẽ	*bikamẽñ	to move away
*akndo	*bikndor	to disappear
antipassives
*apjarẽ	*jujarẽñ	to narrate
*aˀcû	*jəˀcwə̂r	to beg
physiological verbs
*ijkõ	*kõm	to drink
*ijtu	*tur	to urinate
*ijkû	*kwə̂r	to defecate
*ijpê	*pêk	to fart
movement verbs
*ajêt	*jêt	to hang (singular)
*aĵə	*ĵər	to enter (singular)
*aŋgî	*ŋgjêc	to enter (plural)

=== Person inflection and case ===
In all Northern Jê languages verbs, postpositions, and relational nouns inflect for person of their internal argument by taking absolutive ("internal") or accusative person prefixes. The accusative series is required by a subclass of transitive verbs (in finite clauses only) as well as by some postpositions; the absolutive series is the default one and is found with most transitive and all intransitive verbs in finite clauses, with all verbs in nonfinite clauses, with all relational nouns, and with some postpositions. External arguments of verbs are not indexed by person prefixes but are rather encoded by nominative/agentive (unmarked) noun phrases (including personal pronouns) in finite clauses, or by ergative phrases in nonfinite clauses.

In the table below, the label class II refers to a subclass of vowel-initial stems which take the thematic consonant */ĵ-/ in the basic (uninflected) form as well as in some inflected forms (e.g. *∅-j-arkwa ‘my mouth’, *ba-j-arkwa ‘our mouths’, *rop j-arkwa ‘the jaguar's mouth’) but not in others (*g-arkwa ‘your mouth’, *c-arkwa ‘his/her/its mouth’). The archaic allomorphs *∅-/ĵ-/ (first person, class II) and *g- (second person, class II) are only marginally preserved across Northern Jê: the former is preserved in Pykobjê (as in j-apackre ‘my ear’), whereas the reflexes of the latter have been found in Kĩsêdjê, Canela, Pykobjê and in the triadic kinship terms of Mẽbêngôkre.

Pronouns and person prefixes
person	nominative/agentive pronoun	absolutive	accusative
1	*ba	*ij- (class II: *∅-/ĵ-/)	
2	*ga	*a- (class II: *g-)	
1+2	*gu	*ba-/ĵ-/	
3	(*gê)	*c-	*ku-

=== Voice ===
Two valency-reducing operations are encoded by prefixes in Northern Jê: the anticausative voice (finite *a(j)-, nonfinite *bi(t)-) and the antipassive voice (finite *a(p)-, nonfinite *jə-/*ju-).

Voice alternations in Proto-Northern Jê
transitive	intransitivized	gloss
anticausatives
*kaˀte	*ajkaˀte / *bikaˀcêk	to break (transitive) → to break (anticausative)
*kamẽ	*ajkamẽ / *bikamẽñ	to push → to move away
*kundo	*akndo / *bikndor	to lose → to disappear
antipassives
*jarẽ	*apjarẽ / *jujarẽñ	to say → to narrate
*cû	*aˀcû / *jəˀcwə̂r	to ask → to beg

=== Nominal number ===
In most Northern Jê languages, nouns which denote human beings may receive an overt collective plural suffix (Proto-Northern Jê -jê). Its reflexes have been attested in Kĩsêdjê (-jê), Tapayúna (-jê), Parkatêjê (-jê), Pykobjê (-ji), Canela (-jê), among others. In fact, this suffix is part of many names of Northern Jê peoples, as in Kĩsêdjê, Parkatêjê, Pykobjê (self-denomination Pyhcopji), Apànjêkra, and is the ultimate origin of the term Jê itself.

=== Derivational morphology ===
==== Productive affixes ====
All Northern Jê languages make use of at least one diminutive suffix (Proto-Northern Jê *-re) and of an augmentative suffix (*-ti), which may occur in nouns and descriptives. These are widely used in the names of animal and plant species.

For most Northern Jê languages, nominalization suffixes or clitics of two kinds have been described: instrumental/locative nominalizations (Proto-Northern Jê *-ĵə) and agent nominalizations (Proto-Northern Jê *-ĵwə̂ñ or *-kandê). Note that both attach to the nonfinite (nominal) form of the verb. The latter fact has been used as an argument for a nominal interpretation of the reflexes of *-ĵə and *-ĵwə̂ñ in Mẽbêngôkre, where djà and djwỳj have been claimed to be relational nouns meaning ‘container’ and ‘master’, respectively:

In the literature on other Jê languages <...>, these have been considered to be an instrument and an agent nominalizer, respectively. Our contention is that what the "nominalizers" attach to is already nominal <...>, and they themselves are no more than the semantically bleached nouns dʒʌ ‘container’ and dʒwɤj ‘master’.

==== Non-productive affixes ====
In Northern Jê languages, many predicates appear to contain fossilized prefixes of different shapes (such as Proto-Northern Jê *ka-, *ñõ-, *ku-, *py-/*pu-, *ja-, *ju-, *ñĩ-), whose semantic contribution is not always straightforward. These have been variously referred to as formatives or transitivity prefixes.

== Syntax ==
All Northern Jê languages are head-final.

=== Morphosyntactic alignment ===
Prototypically, finite matrix clauses in Northern Jê languages have a split-S alignment pattern, whereby the agents of transitive verbs (A) and the sole arguments of a subclass of intransitive verbs (S_{A}) receive the nominative case (also called agentive case), whereas the patients of transitive verbs (P) and the sole arguments of the remaining intransitive predicates (S_{P}) receive the absolutive case (also called internal case). In addition, transitive verbs are subdivided into two classes according to whether the third person patient is indexed as absolutive (Proto-Northern Jê *c-) or accusative (Proto-Northern Jê *ku-), which has been described as an instance of a split-P alignment. There are only several dozen of transitive verbs which take an accusative patient, all of which are monosyllabic and have distinct finite and nonfinite forms. It has been suggested that all transitive verbs which satisfy both conditions (monosyllabicity and a formal finiteness distinction), and only them, select for accusative patients, while all remaining transitive verbs take absolutive patients in Northern Jê.

Nonfinite clauses (including all subordinate clauses) are headed by nonfinite verbs and are ergatively organized: the agents of transitive verbs (A) are encoded by ergative postpositional phrases, whereas the patients of transitive verbs (P) and the sole arguments of all intransitive predicates (S) receive the absolutive case (also called internal case). The ergative-absolutive alignment in subordinate clauses is found in all Northern Jê languages and is reconstructed by Castro Alves (2010) for Proto-Northern Jê.

In addition, in some Northern Jê languages former biclausal constructions (with an ergatively organized subordinate clause and a split-S matrix clause) have been reanalyzed as monoclausal, resulting in some cases in constructions with a nominative-absolutive alignment pattern.

=== Classes of predicates ===
The following table summarizes the proposed classes of predicates in Northern Jê languages.

argument structure in finite clauses	type	examples
A^{NOM} P^{ACC}	transitive verb (*ku-class)	*krẽ 'to eat' (singular)
A^{NOM} P^{ABS}	transitive verb (default)	*côk 'to paint'
S^{NOM}	(active) intransitive verb	*tẽ 'to go' (singular)
S^{ABS}	descriptive	*ŋgryk 'to be angry'
Exp^{DAT}	monovalent verbum sentiendi	*prə̃m 'to be hungry'
Exp^{DAT} Stimulus^{ABS}	bivalent verbum sentiendi	*kĩñ 'to like'

==== Transitive verbs ====
In the Northern Jê languages, transitive verbs take accusative or absolutive patients in finite clauses, depending on the verb class. In nonfinite clauses, all transitive verbs take absolutive patients. Note that nouns do not receive any overt marking either in the accusative or in the absolutive case; the difference between these two cases is seen in the third person index, which is reconstructed as *ku- in the accusative case and as *c- in the absolutive case.

The transitive verbs which index their patient in the accusative case (in finite clauses) are known as *ku-verbs. All *ku-verbs are monosyllabic and have distinct finite and nonfinite forms. The remaining transitive verbs index their patient in the absolutive case. All verbs that belong to this class satisfy at least one of the following conditions:

- they contain at least two syllables (for example, *pumbu ‘to see’, *kacô ‘to suck’, *kuˀcõ ‘to wash (solid objects)’),
- their finite and nonfinite forms are identical (for example, *côk ‘to paint’, *kre ‘to plant’, *ĵũn ‘to insult’).

Finite *ku- verbs further differ from all other transitive verbs in that under certain circumstances they index their agent (rather than patient) on the verb. This happens when a second-person agent acts over a third-person patient. The phenomenon has been attested in Mẽbêngôkre, Apinajé, and Canela.

==== Descriptives ====
All Northern Jê languages have intransitive predicates which take absolutive (rather than nominative) subjects, known as descriptives. They have been variously described as verbs or nouns. An example of a reconstructed Proto-Northern Jê clause headed by a descriptive is *ij-ŋgryk ‘I am angry’ (literally 1SG^{ABS}-be.angry).

==== Verba sentiendi and dative subjects ====
Verba sentiendi with dative subjects have been described for a variety of Northern Jê languages, such as Canela, Apinajé, and Kĩsêdjê.

Monovalent verba sentiendi take only one argument (experiencer), which is encoded by a dative postpositional phrase, as in the following reconstructed example: Proto-Northern Jê *ij-mə̃ prə̃m ‘I am hungry’ (literally 1SG^{ACC}-DAT hunger).

Bivalent verba sentiendi take two arguments. The experiencer is encoded by a dative postpositional phrase, and the theme receives the absolutive case, as in the following reconstructed example: Proto-Northern Jê *ij-mə̃ a-kĩñ ‘I like you’ (literally 1SG^{ACC}-DAT 2^{ABS}-fun).

== Lexicon ==
=== Predicate number ===
The Northern Jê languages commonly employ different lexemes for the so-called singular and plural predicates. As Nikulin and Salanova (2019) put it,

Archetypally, certain verbs have distinct forms according to the number of the absolutive argument (if the argument in question is not human, number is not marked independently on it but rather only on the verb). In addition, verbal number can indicate repeated action, even if all participants are singular. Further nuances of the plural include a more prolonged or sluggish carrying out of an action, incomplete or ineffective carrying out of the action, and perhaps even indirect evidence for the action.

There are several dozen pairs of predicates which contrast in number. Plural predicates are not regularly derived from their singular counterparts but are rather expressed by unrelated lexemes (in a handful of verbs, it is possible to the fossilized prefix *ja- encoding plural). Some examples of Proto-Northern Jê verbs which differ in number include:

Verbal number in Proto-Northern Jê
singular	plural	gloss
*ga	*bô	to roast
*krẽ	*ku	to eat
*mẽ	*rẽ	to throw
*tẽ	*mõ	to go
*nĵô	*janĵô	to hang
*mbə̂	*jambə̂	to grab, to carry
*kuto	*jato	to ignite
*ñõpôk	*japôk	to pierce
