= Gavião (Jê) =

Total population
- 1,415 (2014)

Regions with significant populations
- Brazil

Languages
- Parkatêjê, Pykobjê

The Gavião are an Indigenous people of Brazil, part of the Jê peoples. They are divided into two groups: the Parkatêjê living on the Tocantins River in the state of Pará, and the Pykobjê of the state of Maranhão. There were about 175 Parkatêjê and over 300 Pykobjê as of the 1990s. They traditionally spoke dialects of the Timbira language.

The Gavião consistently resisted Brazilian incursions until 1857, when they were nearly exterminated by an army expedition. In the 1950s, they suffered greatly from encroachments on their territory and introduced diseases. Their traditional lifestyle was decimated and the Gavião became reliant on government aid. The University of São Paulo launched a program to develop a Gavião nut gathering business to sustain the tribes.
