= Guaianá people =

Guaianás
Gûaîanã

Total population
- 0 (Extinct)

Regions with significant populations
- Brazil

Languages
- Likely Kaingang

Religion
- Animism

Related ethnic groups
- Kaingang

The Guaianás, also known as Guaianases and Guaianã (from old Tupi gûaîanã), were a South American indigenous ethnicity that lived in an area ranging from the modern day city of São Paulo to Uruguay, dying out at some point in the late 17th century.

== Etymology ==
During the Portuguese colonization of Brazil the Guaianás received several different names depending on the author and the choices made during transcription to the latin alphabet, including guayaná, goyaná, goyanã, goainaze, wayanaze. The name Guayaná was used until 1843. The classification as Kaingang was only introduced in the late 19th century by Telêmaco Borba.

The use of the name in the plural form is the official spelling according to the Brazilian government, although other indigenous populations related to the Guaianás that use the Kaingang language (likely the language the Guaianás spoke) prefer the use in the singular form, as they have different cultural notions of the plural use of words when referring to ethnic groups.

== History ==
The Guaianás were described as a settled agricultural people, although hunting and gathering also occurred. European arrival in the region and immigration of other indigenous ethnicities into Guaianá territory caused them to become hunter-gatherers and fishers, which led to population decline.

=== Territory ===
Guaianá people lived mainly in the hills and mountains of the Serra do Mar mountain range and its surroundings. In a book written in 1587, the Portuguese writer Gabriel Soares de Sousa described the Guaianás as being a neighboring people to the Tamoios that lived in the São Paulo valley, as well as the Tupiniquims.

=== Origin theories ===
According to the anthropologist Benedito Antonio Genofre Prezia, there were two main Guaianá groups in the São Paulo region, one that lived until the 16th century and was culturally closer to the Puri people and another that resided further south, likely coming from Paraná, being the ancestors of the modern Kaingang people.

Furthermore, he hypothesized that the term Guaianá was used to refer to two distinct groups, both of the Macro-Jê language family; one being a gatherer population that resided in the Serra do Mar and were closely related to the Puris and Coroados, and another, more agriculture oriented group that lived in the south of Brazil. Other authors claim that there were three Guaianá groups rather than two, grouping the Serra do Mar and Southern Guaianás together under the term Guaianá proper, with the second and third groups being a mix of Guaianás and Tupi peoples and residing in the coast of São Paulo, including the Guaianá-Tupiniquims, the ones that lived in a stretch of coast between the modern day region of Cananéia and Peruíbe, and the Guaianá-Muiramomi, which supposedly lived in the Paraíba river valley and the Ubatuba coast.

Alfred Métraux claimed that the Guaianás were likely bilingual, speaking their own Macro-Jê family languages as well as using old Tupi as a lingua franca in order to communicate with neighboring tribes.
