= Koropó language =

Extinct Macro-Jê language of Brazil

Koropó
- Coropó
- Native to: Brazil
- Region: Minas Gerais
- Ethnicity: Koropós
- Era: attested 1818
- Language family: Macro-Gê: Maxakalían; Maxakalí group; Koropó

Language codes
- ISO 639-3: xxr
- Glottolog: coro1248

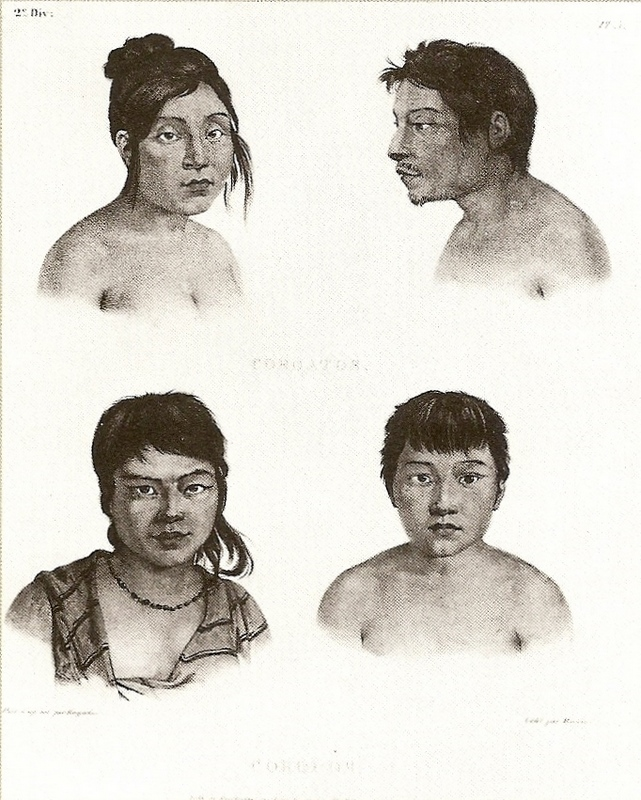
Puris and Koropos

Koropó (Coropó) is an extinct language of eastern Brazil. It has been variously classified as a Maxakalían or a Purian language.

== Classification ==
Although Silva Neto (2007) had assumed Koropó to be a Purian language, Nikulin (2020) classifies Koropó as Macro-Jê (Maxakalían branch).

== Geographical distribution ==
In the 18th century, Koropó speakers lived with Coroado Puri speakers along the Pomba River in Minas Gerais.

== Documentation ==
Koropó is attested by two word lists collected by German explorers in the early 1800s:

- Eschwege (2002: 122-127), 127 words collected in 1815
- Schott (1822, pp. 48-51), 55 words collected in 1818

== Phonology ==
=== Consonants ===
Consonants of Koropó
| | | Bilabial | Alveolar | Palatal | Velar |
|---|---|---|---|---|---|
| Plosive/Affricate | voiceless | p | t | tʃ | k |
| Plosive/Affricate | voiced | b | | | |
| Nasal | | m | n | ɲ | |
| Sibilant | | | | ʃ | |
| Approximant | | | ɾ | j | |

=== Vowels ===
Koropó has a 5-vowel system.

| | Front | Central | Back |
|---|---|---|---|
| Close | i | | u |
| Mid | e | | o |
| Open | | a | |

== Vocabulary ==
(Sch) indicates words collected by Schott (1822).

| Latin | Koropó |
|---|---|
| Abi! | ga-um |
| aer, ventus | naran djota |
| aethiops | tchsaktabn |
| albus, a, um | quattá, gautháma (Sch) |
| altus, a, um | pe-eôá |
| amare | neka-ni-teu |
| anima | oitame |
| animal | orug |
| aqua | teign |
| arbor | mai-man-kroá, mebn (Sch) |
| arcus | ocsoy, kokschaign (Sch) |
| avis | tignam |
| auris | cólim, kohrign (Sch) |
| bibere | sóme |
| bibo | eigna-schópta (Sch) |
| bonus, a, um | terankâ (poranga-tupi) |
| branchium | tschambrim |
| cantare | gangré |
| capilli | itsché |
| caput | pitao, ibdaign (Sch) |
| cera | bakidsäi (Sch) |
| caro, rnis | egneine |
| chorda arcus | kokschaid – schidn (Sch) |
| cito | ga-hoy-pâ |
| cor, dis | ekké |
| cornu | koli |
| cras | herinante |
| culter | tschitschayng |
| da mihi | ga pû |
| dentes | shcorim, shorign (Sch) |
| deus | tupan, tophún (Sch) |
| diabolus | daimon – injauran (Sch) |
| digitus | nhatschuman |
| dormire | mamnom |
| edere | mankshina |
| edamus! | mugnadshi (Sch) |
| ego | eign |
| esnrio, mak, bagn | chruan (Sch) |
| falsus, a, um (non versus) | schitá |
| filia | ecto-boëmm |
| filius meus est | ectogn-hún (Sch) ecton, ectogn (Sch) |
| flavu, a, um | tchaitakáma (Sch) |
| fluvius | cuang |
| folium | tschuptsché (Sch) |
| frater | eschatai |
| frigidus, a, um | ischektáme |
| frons, tis | Polé |
| frutus | memptâ |
| fulmem, tonitru | te-pu-po-ne |
| habeo | papa |
| habesne sagittam ? | nek, pa padn pá ? (Sch) |
| non habeo | brok po (Sch) |
| herba | schapuco |
| heri | kaya |
| hodie | hohra |
| homo albus | chaiobn (Sch) |
| femina albus | chaiobn-bai (Sch) |
| sum homo albus | ekta chraiob-hún (Sch) |
| ignis | ké |
| illi, hi | uamtschone |
| is, ille | mam |
| infans | schapô-ma |
| infra | auwé |
| jugulum | tschitá-ne |
| lac | endjoctane |
| lapis | Nam |
| lignum | Ké |
| lingua | tupé |
| loquor | eignahgnbá (Sch) |
| luna | nasce |
| lux | posêem |
| mamma muliebris | tschoktadn (Sch) |
| viri | puará (Sch) |
| manus | schambri, tschambrim, schambrign (Sch) |
| mater | ectan, aián (Sch) |
| meus, a, um | eign, junhún (Sch) |
| mons | pré-hereu |
| mori | ninguim |
| mulier | boëman |
| multum | anguim, ipaignje (Sch) |
| nasus | schirong |
| niger, a, um | uanán (Sch) |
| nihil | tschi |
| nos | eig-mam, eign-mun (Sch) |
| nox | merindan |
| oculus | uálim, chuarign (Sch) |
| os, oris | ischoré |
| ovum | téme |
| parvus, a, um | tugnapâ |
| pater | ecta, ektagn (Sch) |
| patera cucurbitina | tustschay |
| pellis | tschamnakdsai (Sch) |
| pluvia | teign |
| pollex | tschambrim, chriúna (Sch) |
| profundus, a, um | doê-papa |
| radix | mempshinta |
| ruber, a, um | mukerurú, aluchruruma (Sch) |
| sabulum | cüi-füi |
| sagitta | pahn, padn (Sch) |
| sane, recte | ja |
| sanguis | icu |
| securis | kfuin, gchuagn (Sch) |
| serpens | kanján (Sch) |
| serra | chmekonditschina (Sch) |
| sicera | uanitim. |
| sidera | djuri |
| sol | nascéun |
| supra | pêwa |
| sylva | mebndai (Sch) |
| tarde | pam-me-pâ |
| terra | hâme |
| tu | nime-nen (Sch) |
| tu us | nen-junhún (Sch) |
| domus, tugurium | schéh-me |
| veni huc | ga-nam |
| verus, a, um | pserunhun (Sch) |
| venter | itschin |
| vesti | mebdshidn (Sch) |
| vir | goaï-man |
| vos | jang-yaúme |
| 1 | man, ipaïgn (Sch) |
| 2 | gringrim, alinkrin (Sch) |
| 3 | patepakon, patapakun (Sch) |
| 4 | pate-pe-meschê, patapamasé (Sch) |
| 5 | schambri-tschitta |
| 10? | tschambrindaine |
| Canis | tsoktóme |
| Felis | schapé |
| Gallus | tschefuame |
| Sus | tekenam |
| Blatta orientalis | ingrinngrin (Sch) |
| Psittacus ara | kakágn (Sch) |
| mandioca | kôn |
| potio fermentata e mandioca velzea | kotkusscháuuid (Sch) |
| Tabacum | aptschign |
| Zea mays | tschumnam |
