= Ingain language =

Extinct Jê language of Brazil

Ingain
- Native to: Brazil
- Region: Santa Catarina
- Extinct: early 20th century?
- Language family: Macro-Jê: Jê; Jê of Paraná; Ingain–Kimdá; Ingain

Language codes
- ISO 639-3: None (mis)
- Glottolog: inga1254

Ingain is an extinct Jê language of Brazil, closely related to the Southern Jê languages Kaingáng and Laklãnõ (Xokléng). Kimdá may have been a dialect.

== Geographical distribution ==
Ingain was spoken along the middle Paraná River, from the Iguatemi River in the north to the Arroyo Yabebiry in the south.

== Varieties ==
Related "South Kaingáng" languages were:

- Guayana / Wayana / Gualachí / Guanhanan - extinct language once spoken between the Uruguay River and Paraná River, Rio Grande do Sul, Brazil
- Amhó or Ivitorocái - extinct language from Riacho Ivitoracái, Paraguay. Listed as separate from the Ingain cluster by Mason (1950).

== See also ==
- Kaingang language
