= Puri language =

Extinct language of eastern Brazil

Puri
- Puri–Coroado
- Kwaytikindo
- Native to: Brazil
- Ethnicity: Puri people
- Extinct: after 1885
- Revival: unknown L2 speakers
- Language family: Language isolate
- Dialects: Puri proper; Coroado †
- Writing system: Latin

Language codes
- ISO 639-3: prr
- Glottolog: puri1262
- Linguasphere: 89-IAA-aa
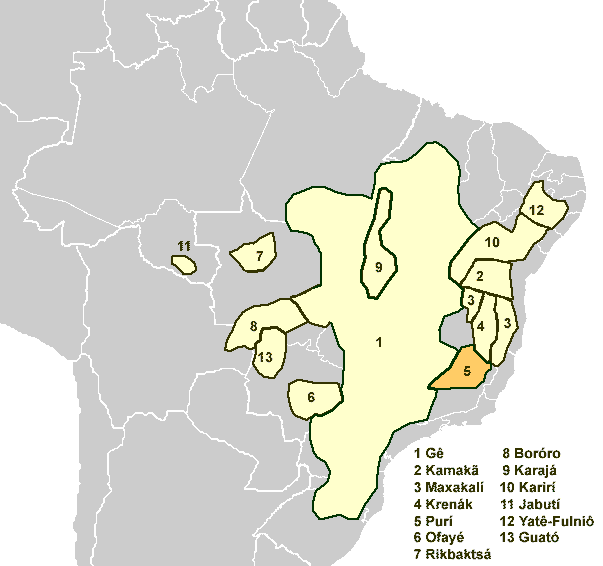
- Map of Purian and Macro-Jê languages

Puri (Puri: Kwaytikindo 'language') is an extinct language currently being revived of eastern Brazil, spoken by the Puri people. It ceased being spoken sometime in the 19th century, but the Puri people have reconstructed the language, and a number of second-language speakers exist, according to the Ethnologue. It can be considered a language isolate, with the related Coroado language seen as a dialect.

== Geographical distribution ==
Puri was spoken in a continuous region stretching from the Preto River to the Paraíba River (from Queluz, São Paulo to Paraibuna, São Paulo). The Puri occupied the Upper Paraíba do Sul River up to Queluz, São Paulo, and the Coroado from the Pomba River to the Doce River in Minas Gerais.

== Classification ==
Puri and Coroado (sometimes collectively called Purian) may be related to Waitaká, which is unattested. Previously, the Koropó language, once spoken in Minas Gerais and Rio de Janeiro, was seen as Purian by Loukotka (1935), but it has been proven to be part of the Maxakalían languages instead by Ramirez et al. (2015).

Purian was initially part of the Macro-Jê proposal. However, when Coropó is removed, there are not sufficient lexical connections to maintain this classification.

The Waitaká and Maromomin languages, both extinct, are possibly belonging to the Purian family, but this is not confirmable as no linguistic information was recorded.

=== Dialects ===
Mason (1950) lists the following dialects of Coroado and Puri:

- Coroado
  - Maritong
  - Cobanipake
  - Tamprun
  - Sasaricon
- Puri
  - Sabonan
  - Wambori
  - Shaynishuna

== History ==
In the 2010s, a Puri language revitalization project was launched in the indigenous village of Maraká’nà (Maracanã), Rio de Janeiro State. In 2021, a primer was published.

=== Documentation ===
The Purian languages are only attested by a few word lists from the 19th century. The lists are:

Puri:

- Martius (1863: 194–195), collected in 1818 at São João do Presídio (now Visconde do Rio Branco, Minas Gerais).
- Eschwege (2002: 122–127), collected in 1815 near São João do Presídio
- Torrezão (1889: 511–513), collected in 1885 at Abre Campo (near Manhuaçu, Minas Gerais)

Coroado:

- Martius (1863: 195–198), collected in 1818 near São João do Presídio
- Eschwege (2002: 122–127), collected in 1815 near São João do Presídio
- Marlière (Martius, 1889: 198–207), collected between 1817 and 1819 at missions along the lower Paraíba do Sul River
- Saint-Hilaire (2000: 33), collected in 1816 near Valença, Rio de Janeiro

== Syntax ==
=== Clause ===
Puri is so poorly attested that no aspect of the language's clausal syntax may be gleaned from the available data.

== Vocabulary ==
=== Numerals ===
| Numeral | Puri |
|---|---|
| 1 | omi |
| 2 | kuriri |

== Bibliography ==
- Campbell, Lyle. (1997). American Indian languages: The historical linguistics of Native America. New York: Oxford University Press. ISBN 0-19-509427-1.
- Kaufman, Terrence. (1994). The native languages of South America. In C. Mosley & R. E. Asher (Eds.), Atlas of the world's languages (pp. 46–76). London: Routledge.
