= Goytacaz =

Goytacaz might refer to:

- Goytacaz Futebol Clube, Brazilian football club
- Goytacaz language, Brazilian language
- Campos dos Goytacazes, Brazilian municipality
