= Rosane Kaingang =

Brazilian indigenous activist

- Kokoj
- Died: October 16, 2016; Brasília
- Occupation: Indigenous rights activist

Rosane Mattos Kaingang (died October 16, 2016) also known as Kokoj (“hummingbird”) was a Brazilian indigenous activist, member of the Kaingang ethnic group, considered one of the most respected and influential indigenous leaders from Brazil.

During her career, Rosane participated in the foundation of the Articulation of Indigenous Peoples of Brazil (Apib), the Articulation of Indigenous Peoples of the Southern Region (ArpinSul) and the National Council of Indigenous Women (Conami). From 2005 to 2007, she was general coordinator of Community Development at the Fundação Nacional do Índio (FUNAI), where she developed projects to encourage the political organization of indigenous women.

== Biography ==
Rosane is a descendant of the Kaingang indigenous ethnic group, present in the Brazilian southern region.

The activist's indigenous name is Kokoj (hummingbird), which was given to her in honor of her great-grandmother who died aged 120.

In June 1992, she participated in the United Nations Conference on Environment and Development (ECO-92/Rio-92) that took place in Rio de Janeiro.

In September 1995, she was one of the founders of the National Council of Indigenous Women (Conami).

In 2001, she joined the Fundação Nacional do Índio (FUNAI), a Brazilian agency for the protection of indigenous interests and culture. Between 2005 and 2007, she was coordinator of Community Development, from where she encouraged indigenous women to organize politically and supported projects She was one of those responsible for a mission of the National Human Rights Council (CNDH) that investigated the living conditions and violations of the rights of indigenous people in southern Brazil.

In 2009, he participated in the Articulation of the Indigenous Peoples of Brazil (Apib) foundation. She then worked on the political articulation of Arpinsul and Apib, participating in meetings, seminars, hearings and mobilizations of indigenous delegations, especially the National Indigenous Mobilization and the Acampamento Terra Livre.

Rosane died at age 54 in 2016 after having discovered a cancer three years prior. On June 3, 2022, she was honored by Google, with a Doodle on their homepage.

== Personal life ==
She was married to Álvaro Tukano, another Brazilian indigenous leadership in the 1980s.
