= Southern Jê languages =

Branch of the Jê languages

Southern Jê
- Geographic distribution: Paraná, Santa Catarina, Rio Grande do Sul, São Paulo, formerly Misiones
- Linguistic classification: Macro-Jê: Jê; Jê of Paraná; Southern Jê
- Subdivisions: Kaingang; Laklãnõ (Xokléng); Guayana †

Language codes
- Glottolog: kain1270

The Southern Jê languages are a branch of the Jê languages constituted by the Kaingang and Laklãnõ (Xokléng) languages. Together with the closely related Ingain, they form the Paraná Jê branch of the Jê family. Kaufman (1994) also includes Guayana.
