= Igreja Matriz de Nossa Senhora da Assunção, Cabo Frio =

Coordinates: 22.8787°S 42.0199°W

Church Mother of Our Lady of Assumption
- Igreja Matriz de Nossa Senhora da Assunção
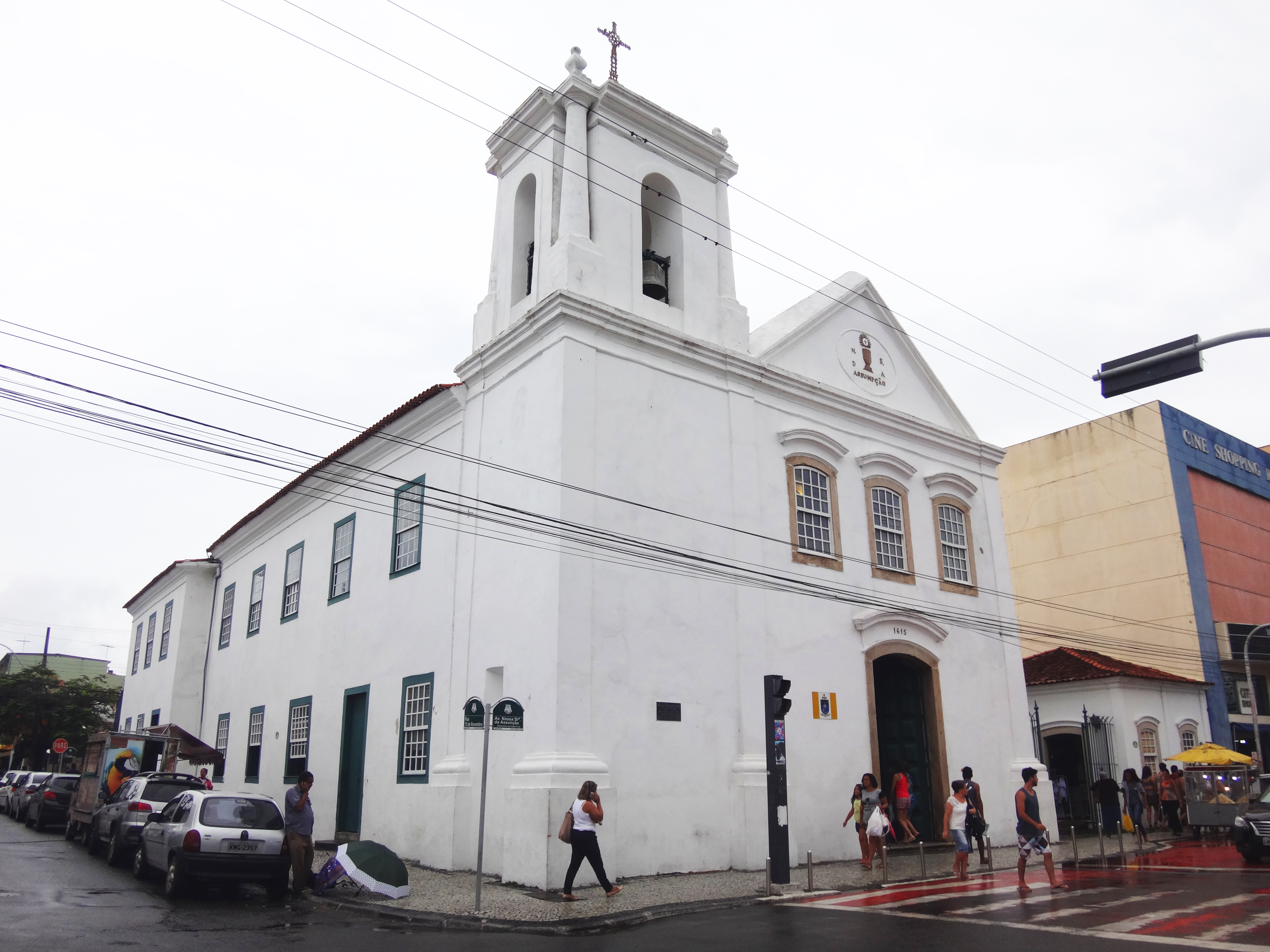
- Church Mother of Our Lady of Assumption
- Location: Cabo Frio
- Country: Brazil
- Denomination: Roman Catholic Church
- Website: www.pnsassuncao.org.br/home

Architecture
- Years built: 1663
- Completed: 1724, 1960

The Church Mother of Our Lady of Assumption (Portuguese: Igreja Matriz de Nossa Senhora da Assunção) is the name given to a religious building that is part of the Catholic Church and is located in the city of Cabo Frio in the state of Rio de Janeiro in the southern part of the South American country of Brazil.

The current church was built in 1663 and in 1724 it was extensively restored with approbation of John V of Portugal. The interior of the church was restored in 1960 under the direction of Adail Bento Costa.

== Interior ==
The interior of the church is simple: the entrance has a single portal, with three windows at the height of the choir and a triangular pediment; at left of the facade stands the bell tower. The plan has a single nave with a side corridor.

The main chapel's altarpiece is a 17th-century wooden sculpture by Portuguese artist Manoel Bessa, brought from Portugal in the early 17th century, when Cabo Frio was founded, and depicts Our Lady of the Assumption. Inside there is also a rare 17th century baptismal font, made of lioz stone.

== Gallery ==
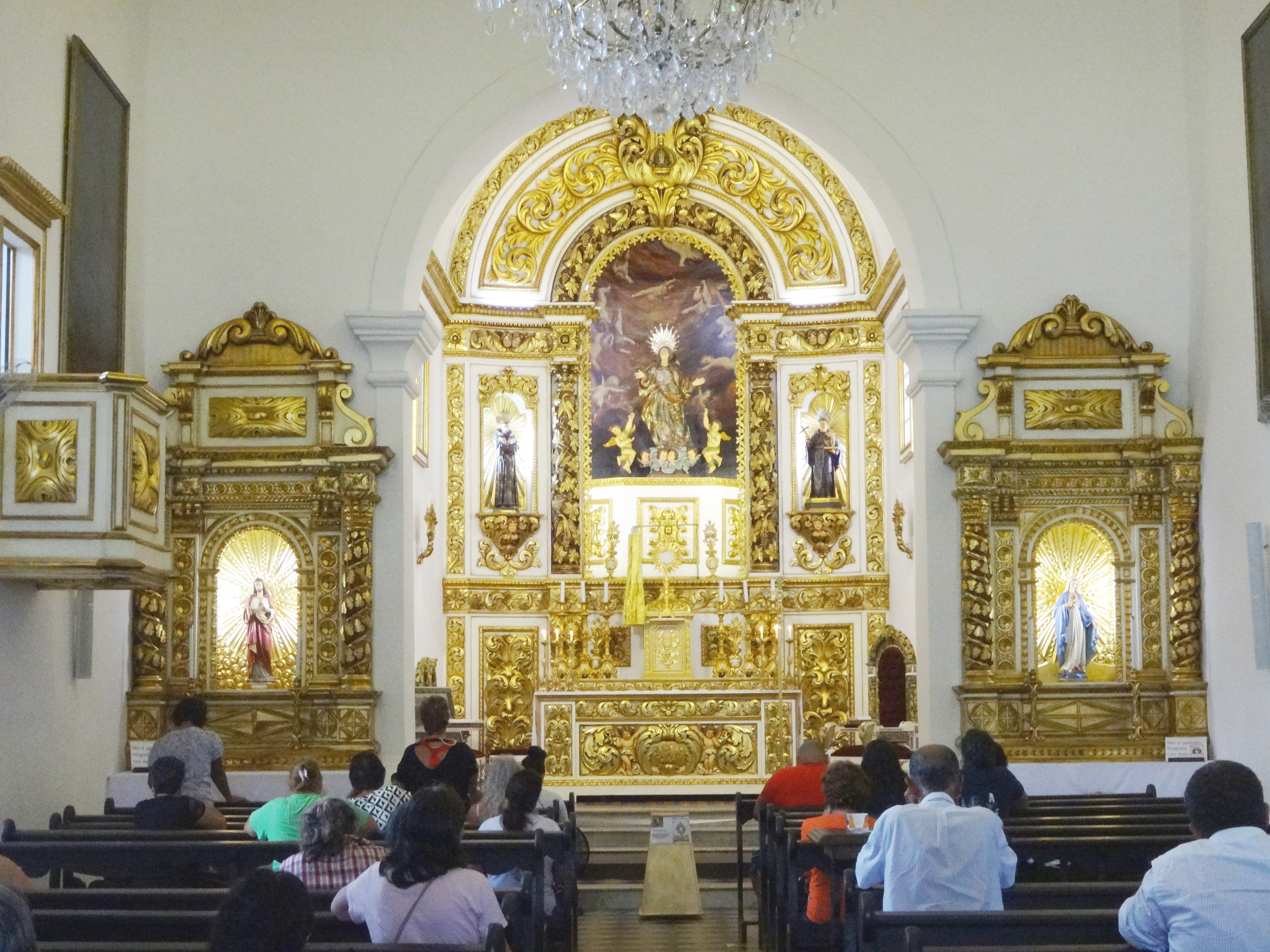
Interior of the Church, where the altarpiece of the main chapel with the 17th century image of the Assumption is visible.

== See also ==
- Roman Catholicism in Brazil
