= Visconde do Rio Branco, Minas Gerais =

Brazilian city in the state of Minas Gerais

Coordinates: 21°00′37″S 42°50′26″W

- Municipality
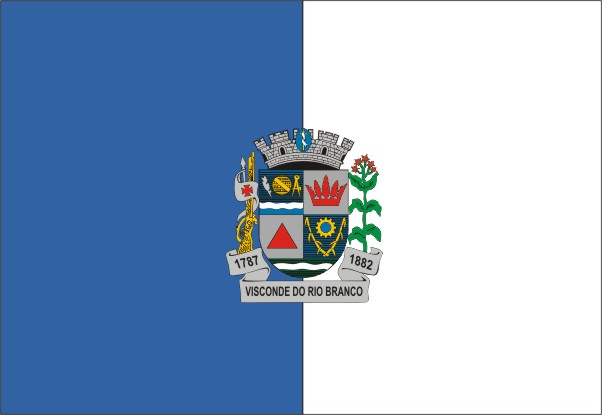
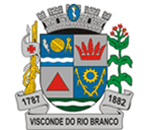
- Flag Coat of arms
- Interactive map of Visconde do Rio Branco, Minas Gerais
- Country: Brazil
- State: Minas Gerais
- Region: Southeast
- Time zone: UTC−3 (BRT)

Location of Visconde do Rio Branco within Minas Gerais

Visconde do Rio Branco is a Brazilian municipality in the state of Minas Gerais. As of 2020 its population is estimated to be 42,965.

== History ==
The Purian languages, now extinct, were formerly spoken in and around what is now Visconde do Rio Branco.

Visconde do Rio Branco was founded in 1810 and had been called by the name "São João". The little village was growing up till 1839 when it finally was recognized as a true village. At 1881 was elevated to City and subordinate to Ubá (the most industrial city of the micro-region) and it received the name Visconde do Rio Branco.

== See also ==
- José Paranhos, Viscount of Rio Branco
- List of municipalities in Minas Gerais
