= Waitaká language =

Extinct unclassified language of Brazil

Waitaká
- Goytacaz
- (unattested)
- Native to: Brazil
- Region: Rio de Janeiro
- Ethnicity: Goitacá
- Extinct: by 18th century
- Language family: Purian ?: Waitaká

Language codes
- ISO 639-3: None (mis)
- Linguist List: 4x0
- Glottolog: None
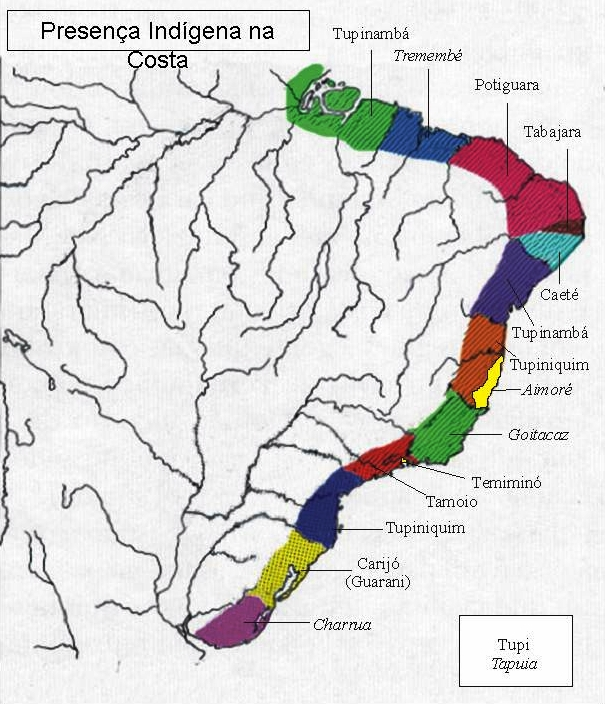
- Goytacaz

Waitaká (Guaitacá, Goyatacá, Goytacaz) is an extinct language of Brazil, on the São Mateus River and near Cabo de São Tomé in the state of Rio de Janeiro. Not a word of it is known. Tribal divisions of the Goyatacá were Mopi, Yacorito, Wasu, and Miri. It may have been one of the Purian languages, though others consider this classification "circumstantial", and Alfred Métraux (1946) described its classification as "[w]ithout any valid reason".

The Goytacaz language is traditionally associated with the origin of the toponym Macaé, which is believed to have derived from the term miquié, meaning "river of catfish" in that language.
