= Puri people =

Indigenous ethnic group of Brazil

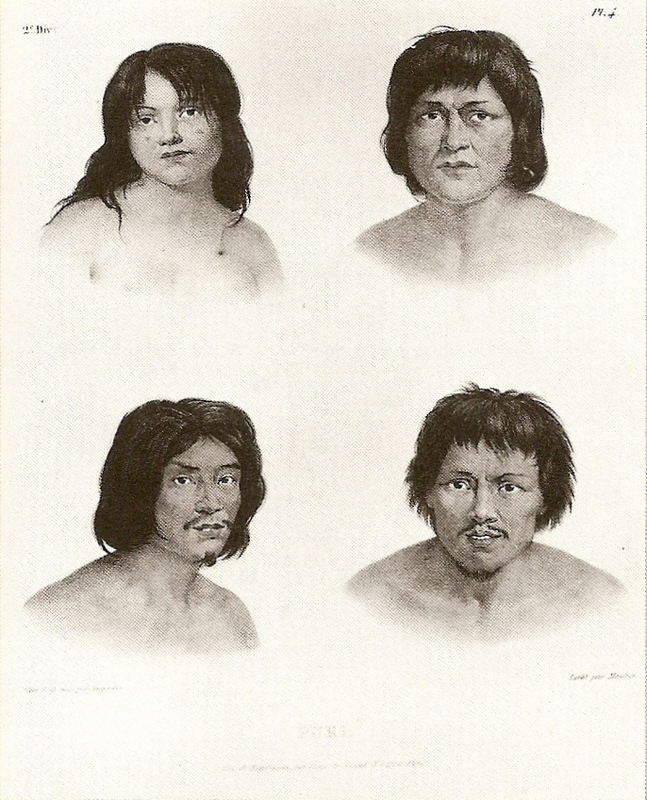
Portraits of 19th century members of Puri tribe (the 2 above), by German painter Johann Moritz Rugendas.

The Puri (also Puri-Coroado, Coroado, Telikong and Paqui) are an Indigenous people of Brazil. The now-extinct Puri languages were thought to have belonged to the Macro-Jê language family, but are now seen as isolated. 675 people identified as Puri in 2010.

In the pre-colonial period the Puri occupied territory across the hydrographic basin of the Paraíba do Sul River as well as more limited areas in the basins of the Rio Grande and Doce rivers - territory spreading across what are now four states in the South East of Brazil: Espírito Santo, Rio de Janeiro, Minas Gerais and São Paulo.

In the colonial period, the Puri were dispossessed of their traditional lands, which covered much of the economic heartland of colonial Brasil. By the 17th century, to escape Colonial oppression, most if not all of the Puri people in what is today São Paulo state had migrated north along the Paraiba do Sul River to settle in villages in the lower basin of the river, around the tributary Pomba, Negro and Muriaé rivers - in today's northern Rio de Janeiro state.

By the end of the 19th century the distinct Puri language and identity had been lost and the Puri people were considered "extinct." However, in the 20th and 21st century people of Puri descent have begun to recover their indigenous identity.

== Accounts and modern research ==
According to Brazilian journalist and UENF press secretary Fulvia D'Alessandri, the Puri were nomadic and inhabited the region of São Paulo.

In a study called "Diversidade étnica dos indígenas na bacia do baixo Paraíba do Sul. Representações construídas a partir da Etnohistória e da Arqueologia" by historian Dr. Simonne Teixeira (also from UENF), the accounts of travelers and foreign naturalists from the 19th century are cited. When such accounts occurred, the Puri were already socially fragmented, due to the influences of colonization. Italian friars commanded two important settlements in the region, with which many Puri kept work relations: "São José de Leonissa" (now São Fidélis) and "Aldeia da Pedra" (now Itaocara). Even so, accounts such as that of Wied-Neuw and Burmeist, which had both been in the region during the 19th century, there were still nomadic Puri groups at the time, that carried only the absolutely necessary to survive in their harsh, dense vegetation environment.

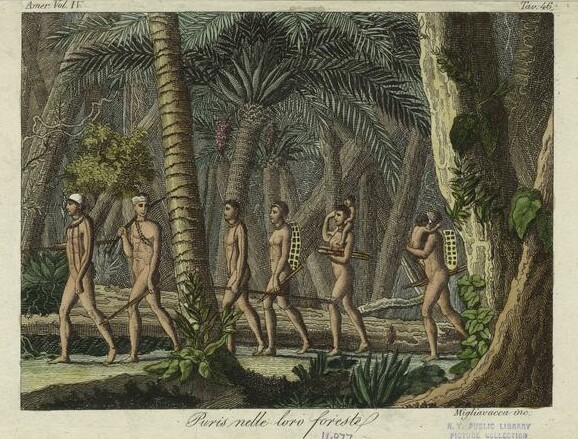
Puris nelle loro foreste ("Puris in Their Forest") by Italian Giulio Ferrario.

Both the German naturalist Maximilian von Wied-Neuwied and Burmeist describe the nomadic Puri of the 19th century. Burmeist states that their huts were very light habitations, built of palm tree leaves and "resembling bird cages", while Wied-Neuw speaks of their simplicity and lack of attachment to structures and land, valuing only few tools. With the deforestation resulting from the extensive coffee plantations of the time, the nomadic peoples of Brazil lost much of their space, and many the remaining Puri were forced to work in the farms, as domestic workers and, especially, as lumberjacks for the clearing of the forest and carrying of wood through the river, forming a cheap workforce for landowners. There are accounts of misery among the Puri for the entire 19th century, as workers were severely underpaid (sometimes even receiving salary in tobacco, aguardiente and "colorful textiles"), and by the end of the century, they were considered as "extinct", leading to the belief that they were assimilated into Brazilian society over time, rather than being victim of the genocides proposed to other tribes (such as the Goitacá people, said to have been decimated for not accepting Portuguese rule).

== Possible practice of Mummification ==
During Jean-Baptiste Debret's voyage to Brazil, he made several depictions of the Puris. One of those depicted the mummy of a deceased Cacique, with Debret writing that the "Coroados" buried their dead in urns known as Camucis next to great trees, with the chief sitting crosslegged on his heels. However, while there is evidence of the use of funerary urns in Jê cultures, nothing in the archaeological record proves the practice of mummification among the Puris or other Jê peoples, and there's evidence to believe that this might have been a romantization of the peoples based on second-hand information.

== See also ==
- Purian languages
