= Xokleng =

Indigenous people of Brazil

Laklanõ
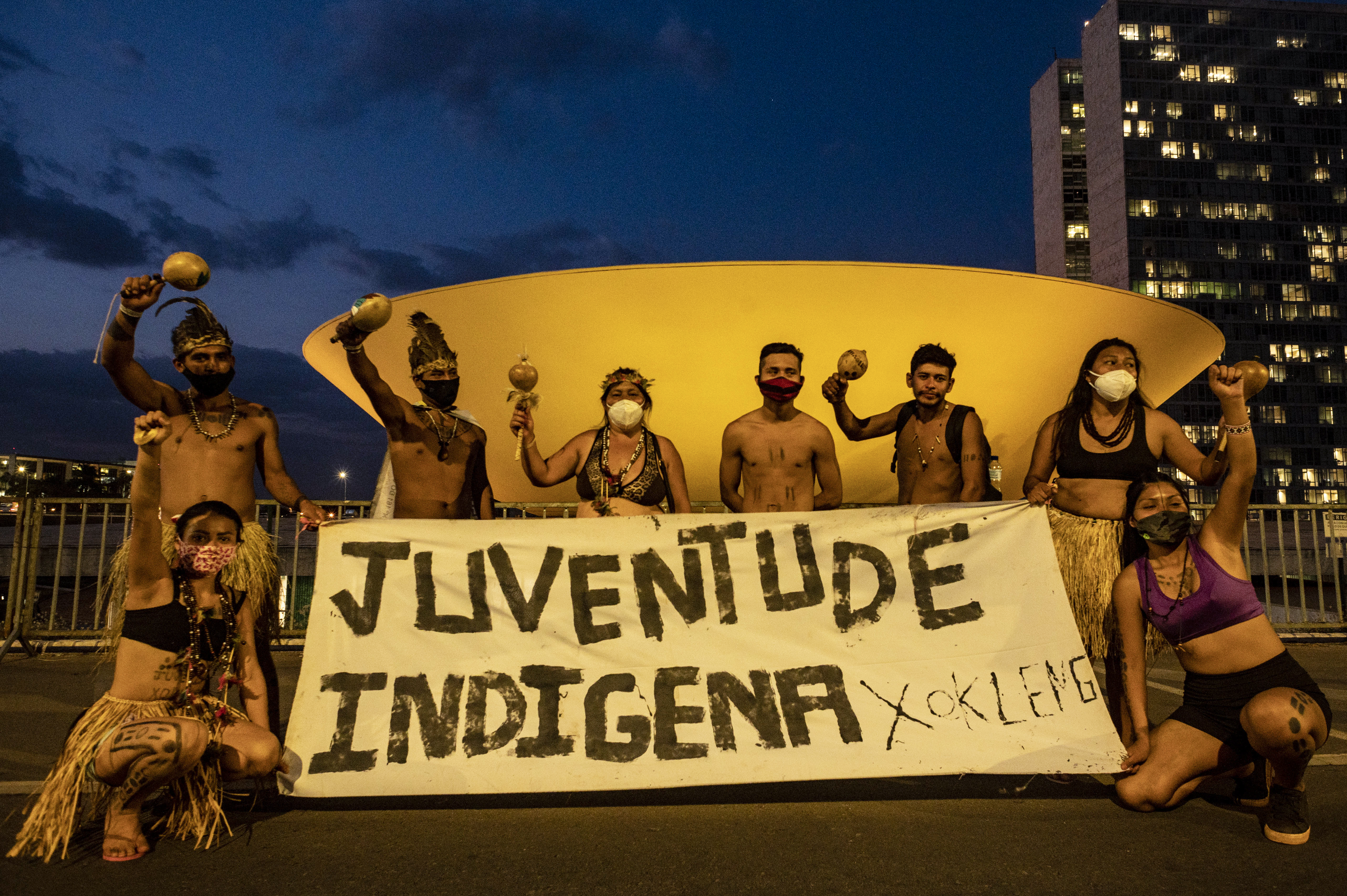
- Young Xokleng demonstrating in Brasília for the Indigenous Ibirama-La Klãnõ Lands (2021)

Total population
- 2,153 (2020)

Regions with significant populations
- Brazil - Santa Catarina

Languages
- Xokleng, Portuguese

Religion
- Shamanism

Related ethnic groups
- Kaingang

The Xokleng or Aweikoma (sometimes called botocudos) are an Indigenous tribe of Brazil; their territory is located mainly in the state of Santa Catarina. They were one of the original inhabitants of Misiones Province in Argentina. They are also found on the Ibirama, Posto Velho, and Rio dos Pardos reservations.
