= Cataguases =

Municipality in Minas Gerais, Brazil

- Municipality
- Municipality of Cataguases
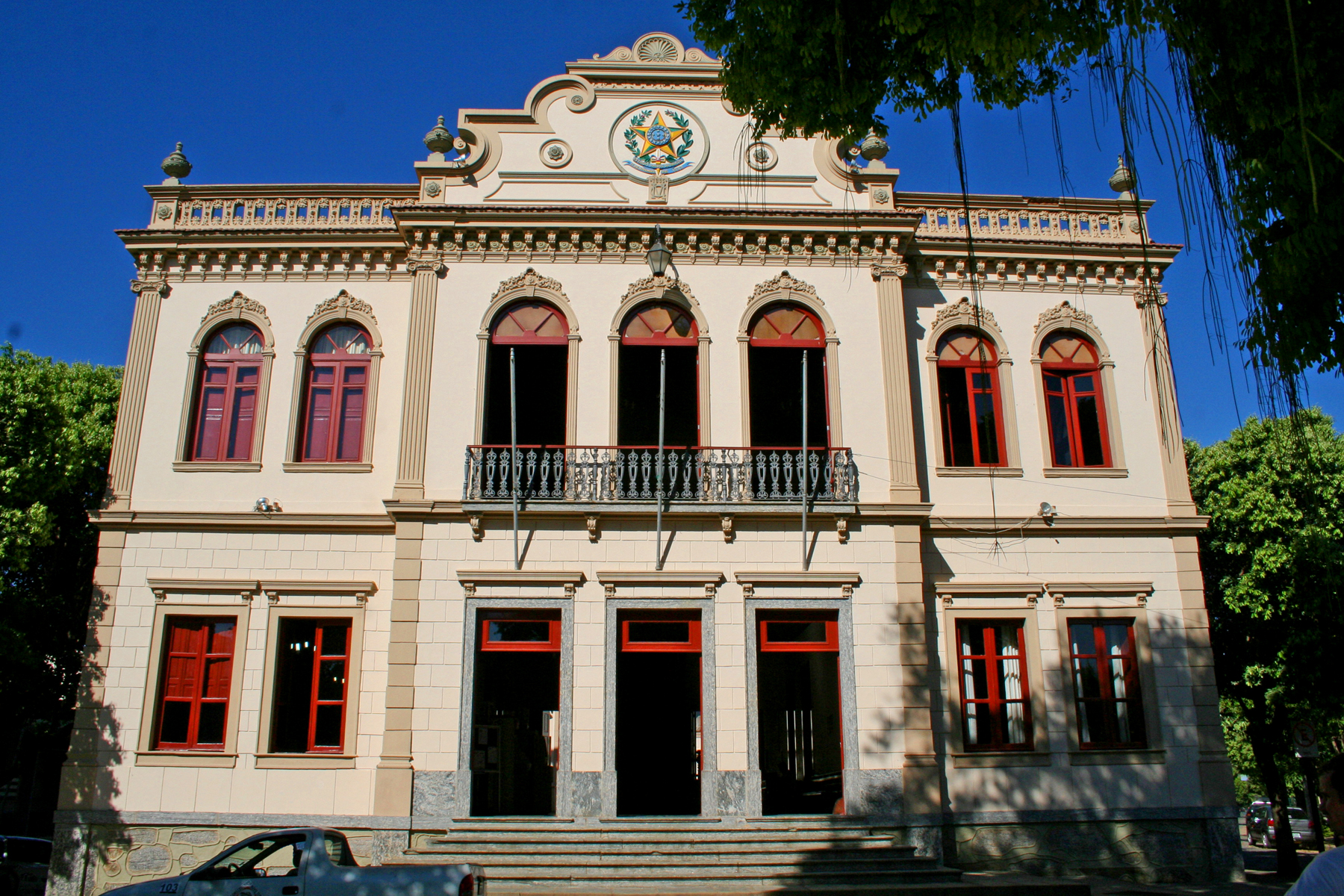
- Cataguases City Hall

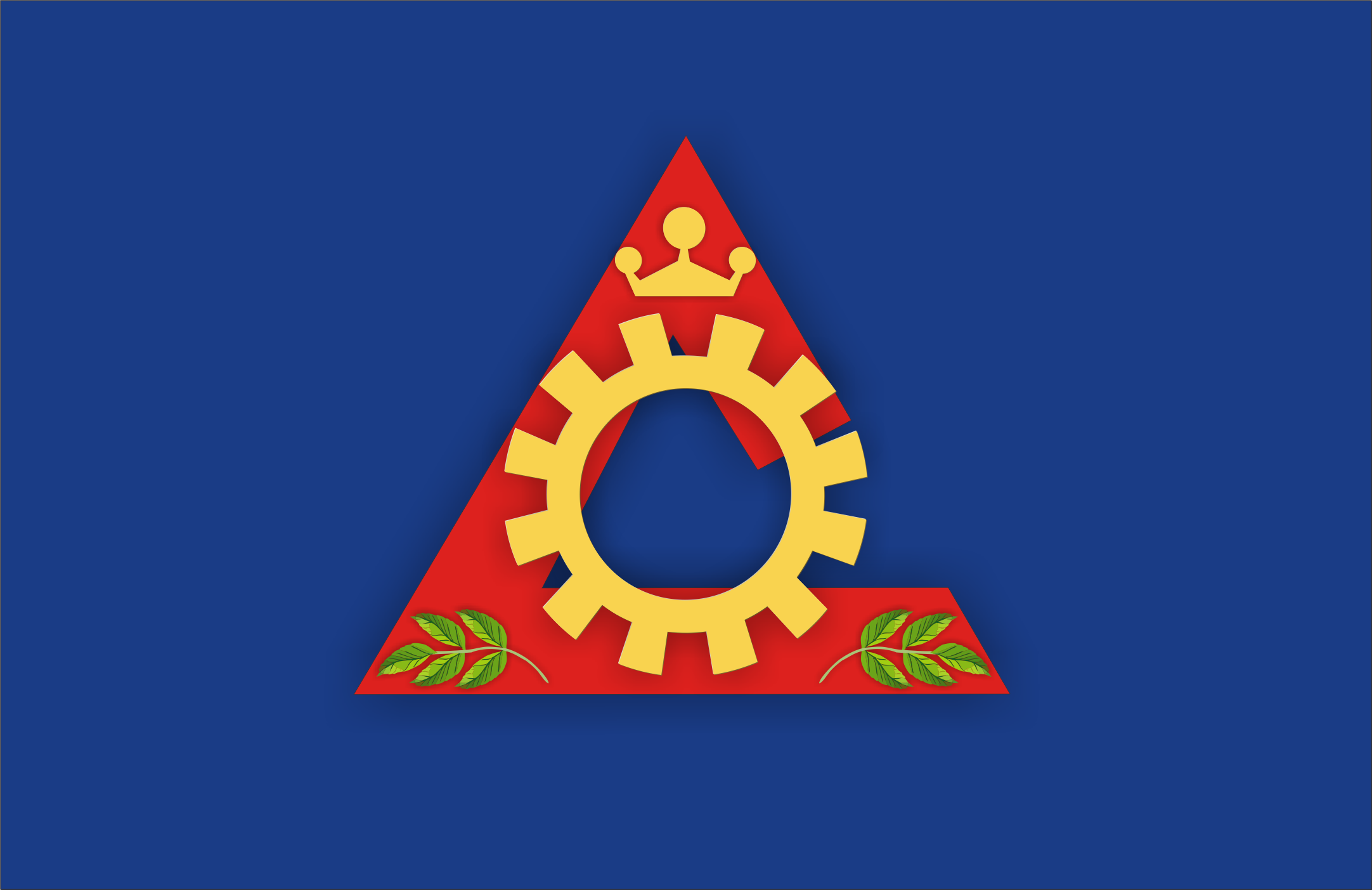
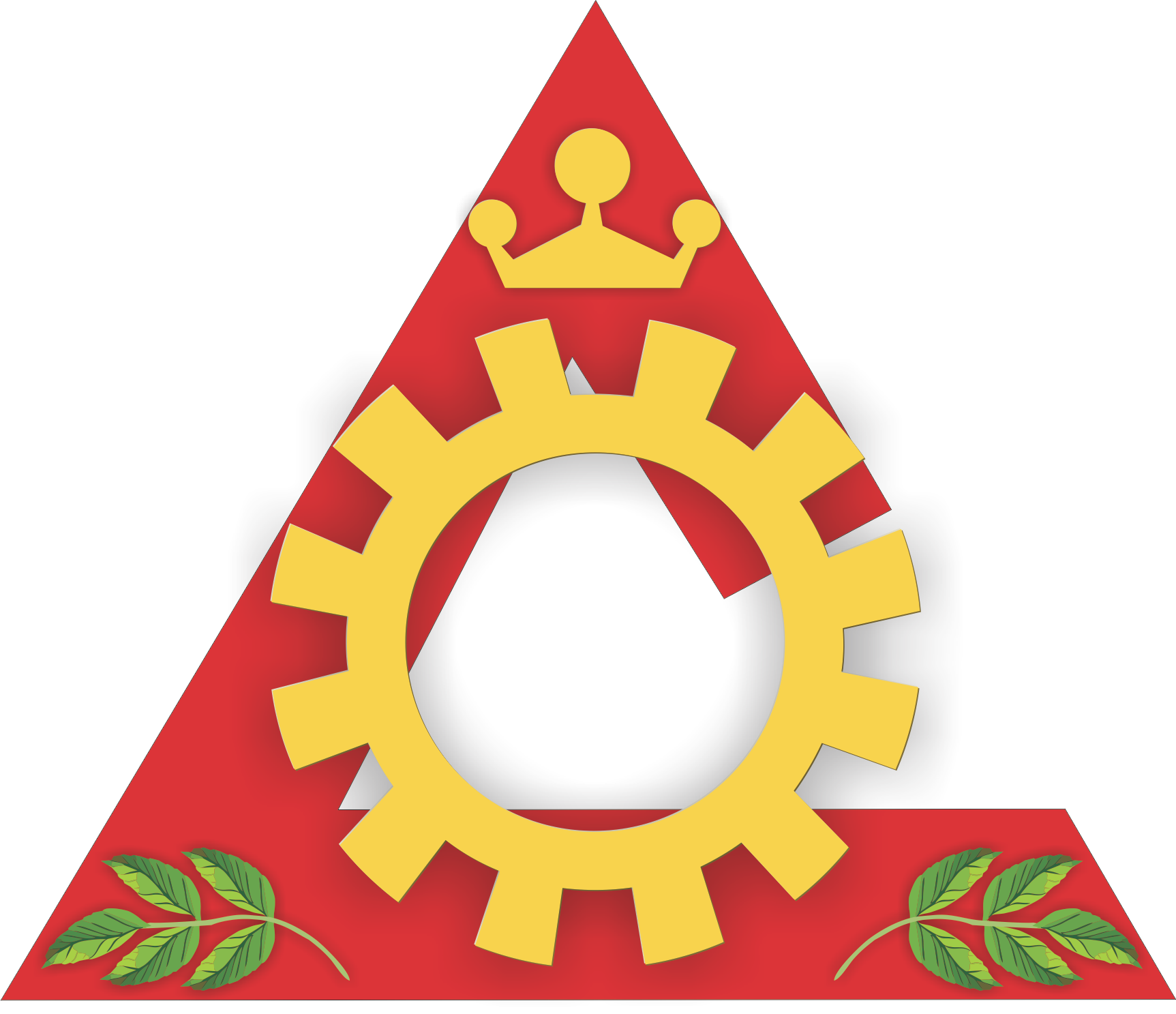
- Flag Coat of arms

- Location in Minas Gerais

- Location in Minas Gerais Location in Brazil
- Coordinates: 21°23′20″S 42°41′49″W
- Country: Brazil
- Region: Southeast
- State: Minas Gerais
- Intermediate region: Juiz de Fora
- Immediate region: Cataguases
- Founded: 26 May 1826
- Municipality installed: 8 September 1877
- City status: 13 September 1881
- Districts: Cataguases (seat), Aracati de Minas, Cataguarino, Glória de Cataguases, Sereno, and Vista Alegre

Government
  - Mayor: José Henriques (MDB)
  - Term: 2025–2028

Area
  - Total: 491.767 km^{2} (189.872 sq mi)
- Elevation: 169 m (554 ft)

Population (2022 census)
  - Total: 66,261
  - Estimate (2025): 67,732
  - Density: 134.74/km^{2} (348.98/sq mi)
- Demonym: cataguasense
- Time zone: UTC−3 (BRT)
- Area code: 32
- HDI (2010): 0.751 (high)
- GDP per capita (2023): R$32,290.72
- Website: www.cataguases.mg.gov.br

Cataguases is a municipality in the southeastern part of the state of Minas Gerais, Brazil. It had a population of 66,261 in the 2022 census, with an estimated population of 67,732 in 2025, in an area of 491.767 km^{2} (189.872 sq mi). It is mainly an industrial centre (textile, metallurgy, clothes) with a strong influence of coffee plantation in its early history (19th century).

== History ==
In the 1920s, the city was associated with the Brazilian cinema pioneer Humberto Mauro and a generation of writers for the short-lived Revista Verde. Humberto Mauro shot there some films that earned him a good reputation nationwide. He later made Braza Dormida (Sleeping Fire) and O Descobrimento do Brasil (The Finding of Brazil) and was a reputed Tupi language scholar.

Industrialisation changed the town significantly and caused some of its citizens to become very rich in the 1920s and 1930s. As a result, the city centre was remodeled accordingly to the ultimate architecture styles. The architect Oscar Niemeyer and painters Cândido Portinari, Djanira and Emeric Marcier are some of the Brazilian artists who left contributions there at that time.

After three decades of wealth, the town lost its prominence in the 1970s and 1980s. The economic crisis and the changes due to the modernisation of the industries provoked high unemployment rates and depreciation of salaries, reducing the town's wealth.

In 2003, the town was the site of an ecological accident caused by the spilling of chemical waste that affected the brook Cágado and the rivers Pomba and Paraíba do Sul, threatening the water supply of more than 20,000,000 Brazilians (including the state of Rio de Janeiro).

== Geography ==
=== Climate ===
Cataguases experiences a tropical savanna climate (Aw under Köppen climate classification). Temperatures are high (above 18 °C (64.4 °F)) all over the year, and low temperatures lasting for a whole day are rare, and generally only occur in the dry season. The wet season starts in September and goes until May, while the dry season goes from May to September. Floods are not uncommon in the town, and generally there is one per year, in December, January or February. On the other side, during the dry season Rio Pomba has considerably less water than in other periods, and some people have respiratory diseases related to low air humidity.

=== Temperatures ===
Climate data for Cataguases
Month	Jan	Feb	Mar	Apr	May	Jun	Jul	Aug	Sep	Oct	Nov	Dec	Year
Mean daily maximum °C (°F)	31.8 (89.2)	32 (90)	31.9 (89.4)	29.9 (85.8)	27.8 (82.0)	25.9 (78.6)	26.7 (80.1)	28.5 (83.3)	29 (84)	29.8 (85.6)	30.5 (86.9)	31.2 (88.2)	29.6 (85.3)
Mean daily minimum °C (°F)	21.7 (71.1)	21.9 (71.4)	21.3 (70.3)	19.2 (66.6)	16.4 (61.5)	14.4 (57.9)	14.3 (57.7)	15.1 (59.2)	17.2 (63.0)	19.4 (66.9)	21.3 (70.3)	21.1 (70.0)	18.6 (65.5)
Average precipitation mm (inches)	241.2 (9.50)	186.8 (7.35)	127.4 (5.02)	55.9 (2.20)	29.5 (1.16)	11.3 (0.44)	22.4 (0.88)	14.7 (0.58)	47.9 (1.89)	99.4 (3.91)	197.4 (7.77)	203.0 (7.99)	1,236.9 (48.70)
Source: World Climate

== See also ==
- List of municipalities in Minas Gerais
