= Dr. Serginho =

Brazilian politician (born 1981)

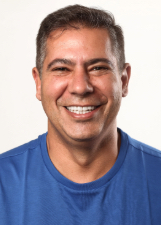
- Serginho in 2024

Mayor of Cabo Frio
- Incumbent
- Assumed office 1 January 2025
- Preceded by: Magdala Furtado

Personal details
- Born: 5 October 1981 (age 45)
- Party: Liberal Party (since 2022)

Sérgio Luiz Costa Azevedo Filho, better known as Dr. Serginho (born 5 October 1981), is a Brazilian politician serving as mayor of Cabo Frio since 2025. From 2019 to 2024, he was a member of the Legislative Assembly of Rio de Janeiro.
