= Xokleng language =

Macro-Jê language spoken in Brazil

Xokleng
- šokléng
- Native to: Brazil
- Region: Santa Catarina
- Ethnicity: Xokleng
- Native speakers: (760 cited 1998)
- Language family: Macro-Jê: Jê; Jê of Paraná; Southern Jê; Xokleng

Language codes
- ISO 639-3: xok
- Glottolog: xokl1240
- ELP: Xokleng

Xokleng or Laklãnõ is a Southern Jê language (Jê, Macro-Jê) spoken by the Xokleng people of Brazil. It is closely related to Kaingang.

== Names ==
Alternate names are Socré, Chocré, Xocren, Bugre, Botocudo, Aweicoma, Cauuba, Caahans, Caagua, Caaigua.

== Phonology ==
=== Vowels ===
| | Front | Central | Back |
|---|---|---|---|
| Close | i ĩ | ɨ ɨ̃ | u ũ |
| Close-mid | e | ə | o |
| Open-mid | ɛ ɛ̃ | ə | ɔ ɔ̃ |
| Open | | a ã | |

- Vowel off-glides may also be present in word-final position.

=== Consonants ===
| | Labial | Dental | Alveolar | Palatal | Velar | | Glottal |
| | Labial | Dental | Alveolar | Palatal | plain | lab. | Glottal |
|---|---|---|---|---|---|---|---|
| Nasal | m ~ ᵐb | | n ~ ⁿd | ɲ | ŋ ~ ᵑɡ | ŋʷ ~ ᵑɡʷ | |
| Stop | p | | t | | k | kʷ | ʔ |
| Affricate | | | | t͡ʃ | | | |
| Fricative | v ~ w | ð | | | | | h |
| Approximant | v ~ w | | | j | | | |
| Lateral | | | l | | | | |

- Nasal sounds /m, n, ŋ, ŋʷ/ are heard as prenasalized voiced-stops [ᵐb, ⁿd, ᵑɡ, ᵑɡʷ] when preceding oral vowel sounds and heard as nasal sounds [m, n, ŋ, ŋʷ] when preceding nasal vowels, or in nasal positions.
- /v/ can have an allophone of [w] in free variation, and can be heard as a nasal [ɱ] when preceding a nasal vowel or consonant sound.
- /ð/ may have an allophone of [θ] when following /k/, and as [z] in free variation in word-initial positions.
- /j/ is heard with an allophone of [d͡ʒ] when in nasal positions, or when preceding or following other palatal sounds.
- /l/ may be nasalized as [l̃] when in nasal positions.
