= Cabo Frio =

- Municipality
- Município de Cabo Frio
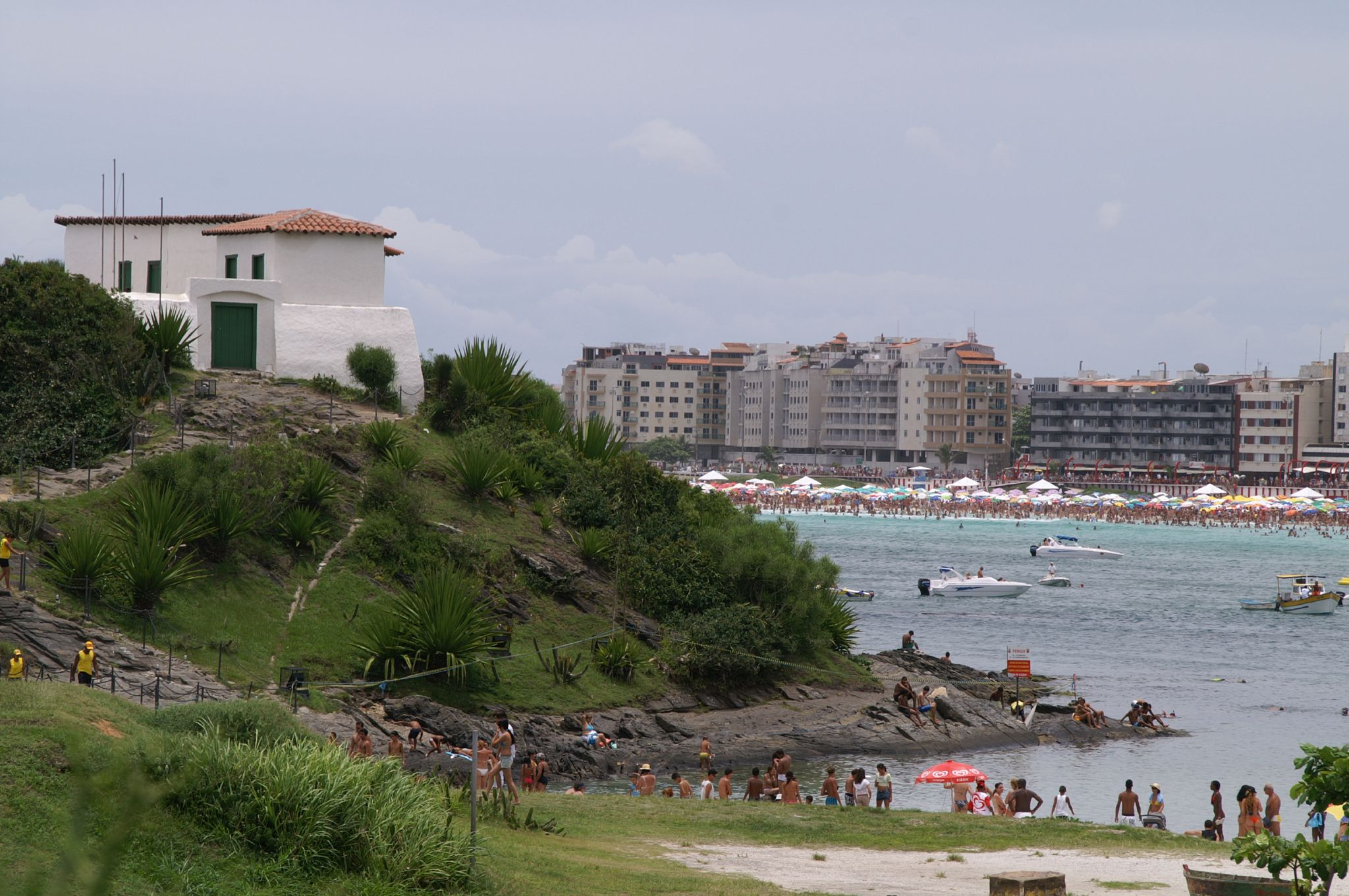
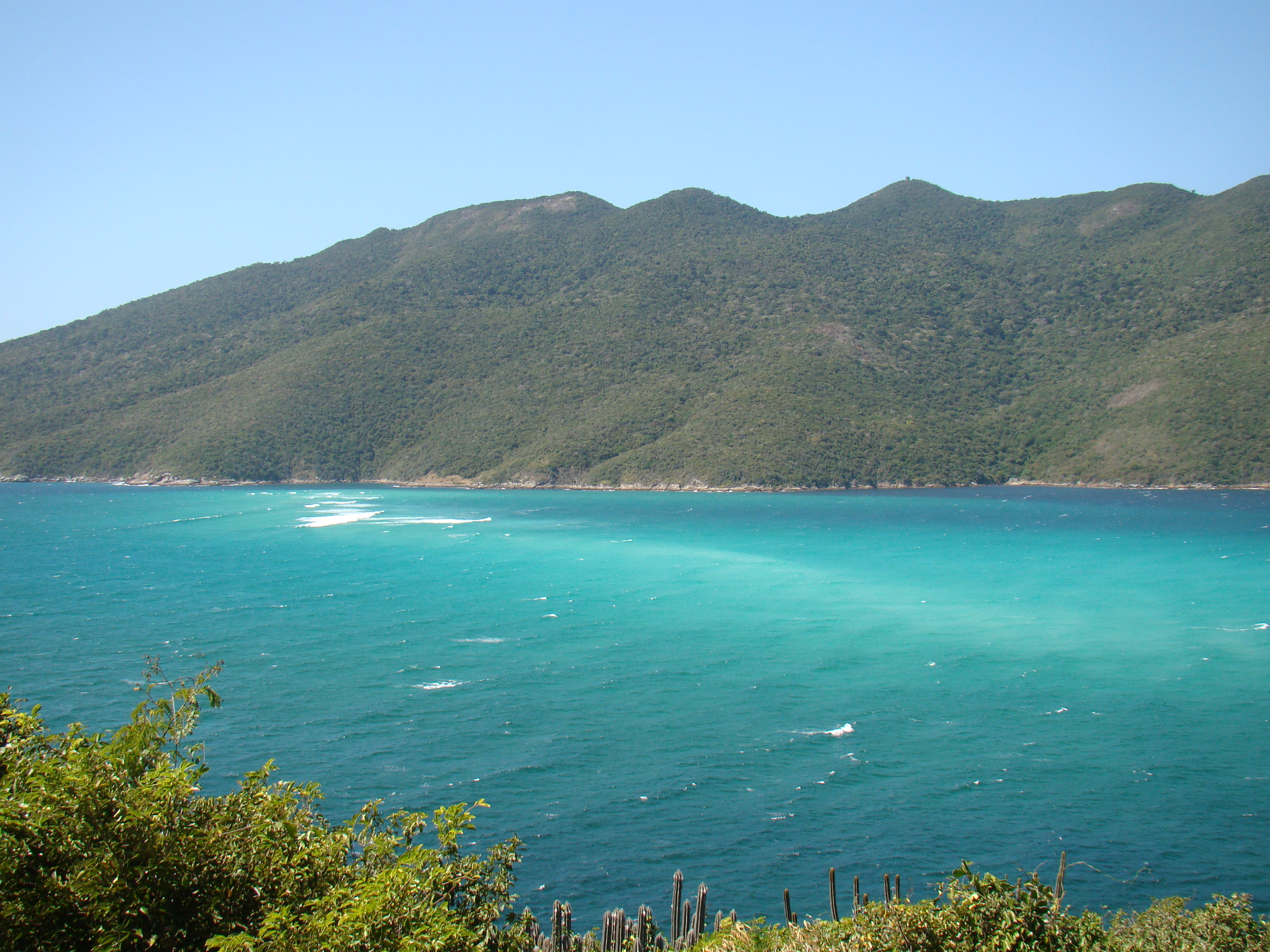
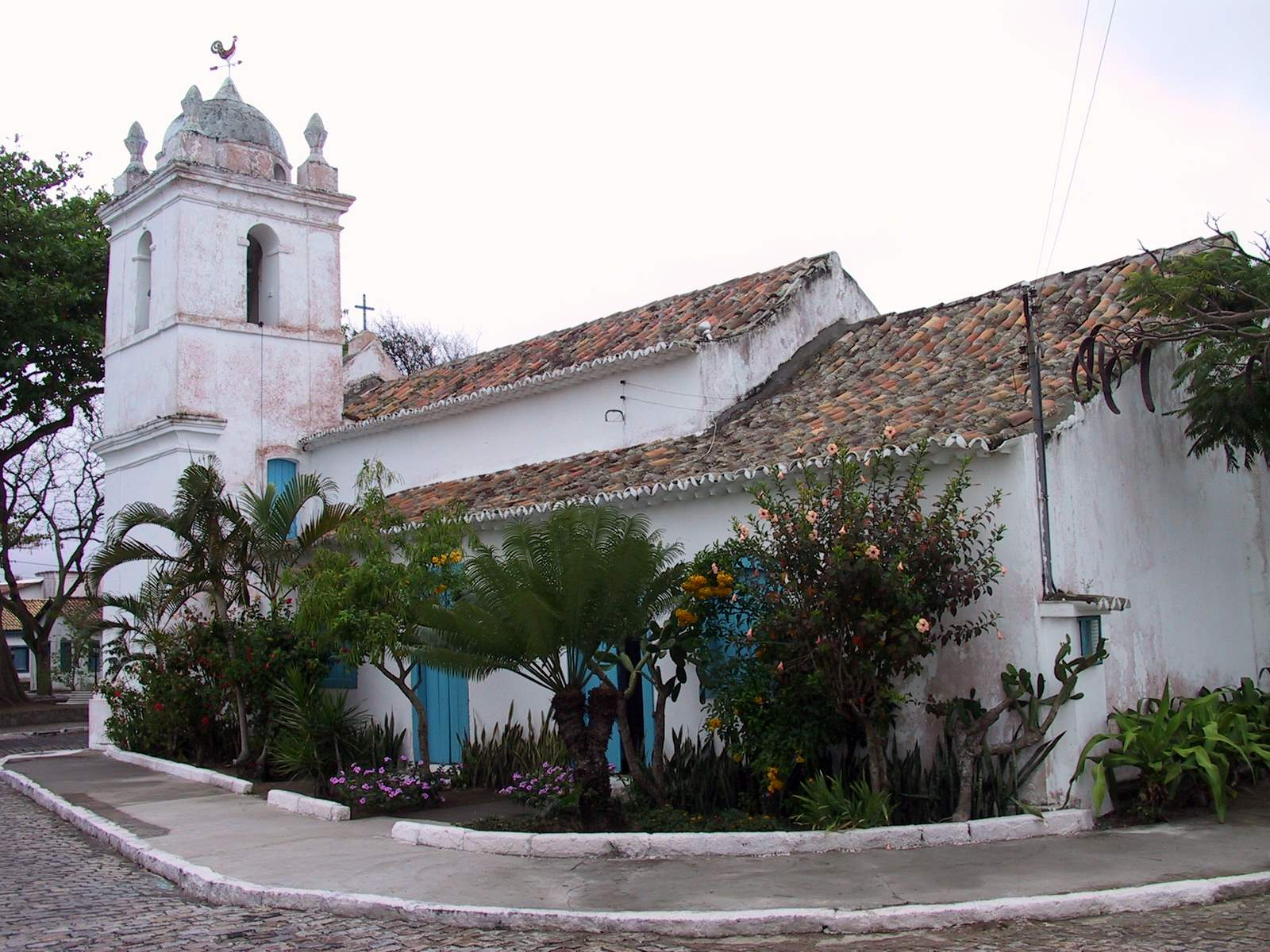
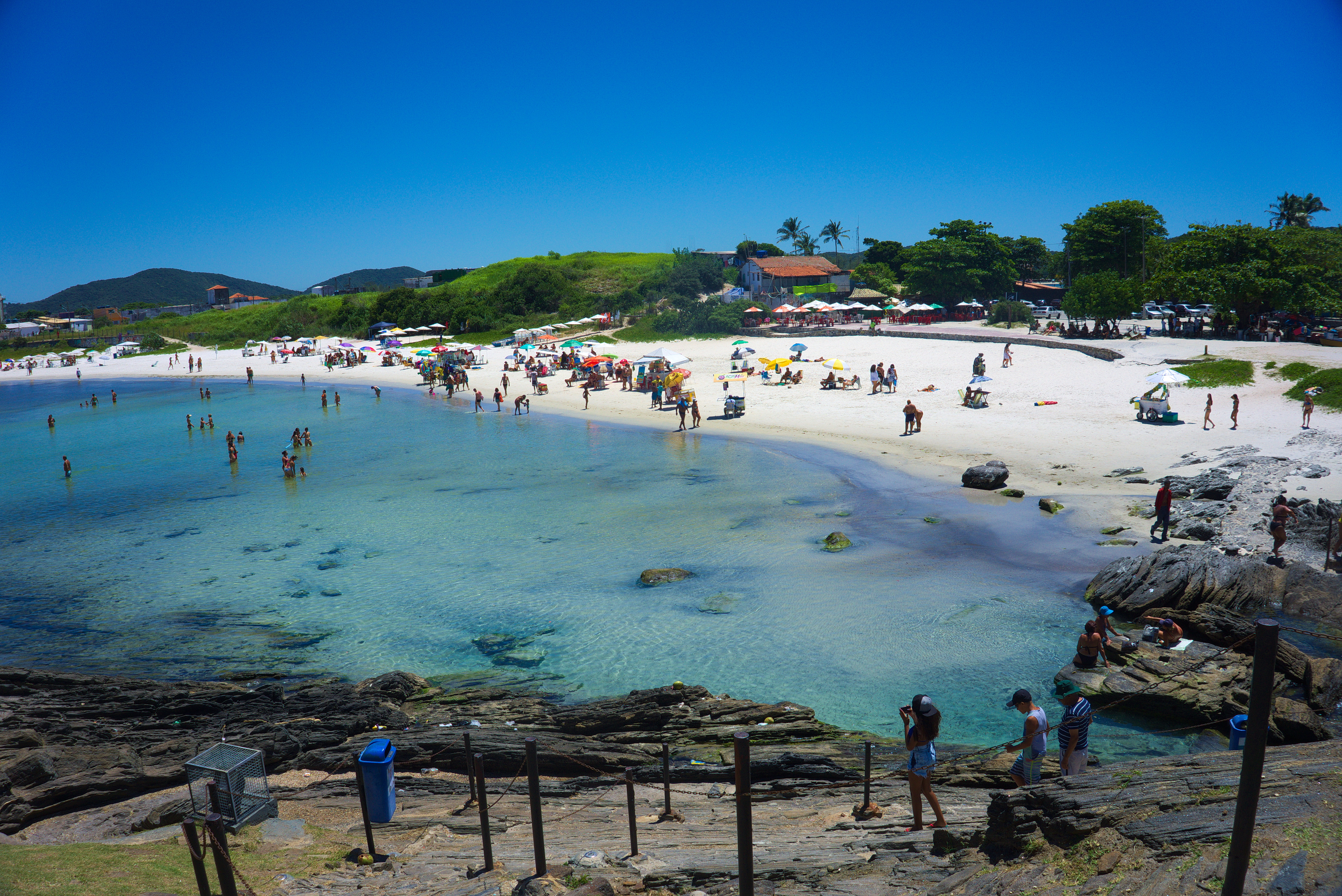
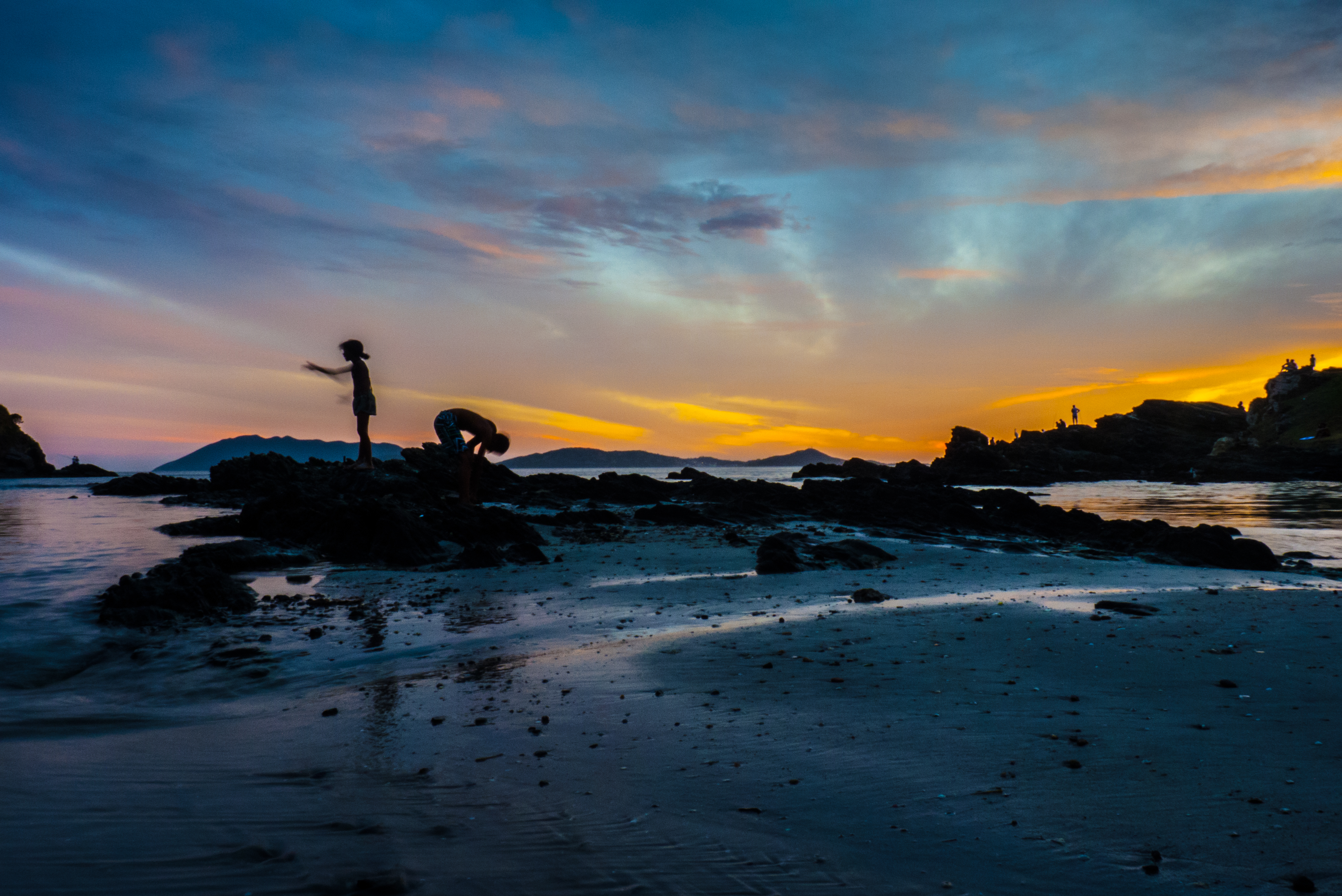
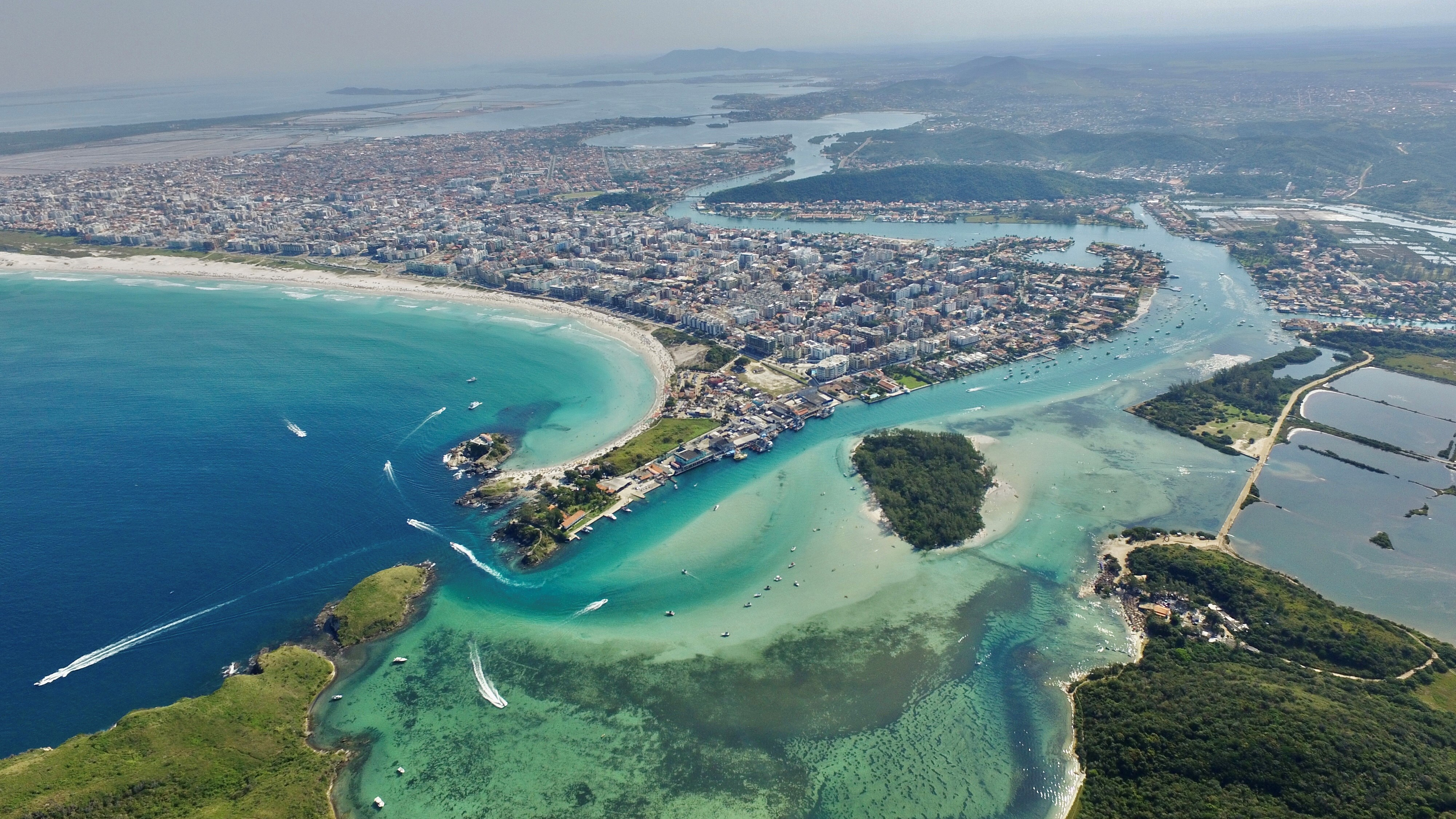
- From top to bottom and left to right: view of Praia do Forte (Fort Beach); island in the city; Church of São Benedito; beach at the foot of São Matheus Fort; sunset on the beach and aerial view of the city.

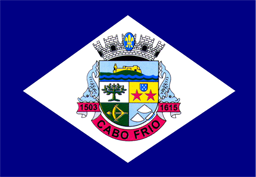
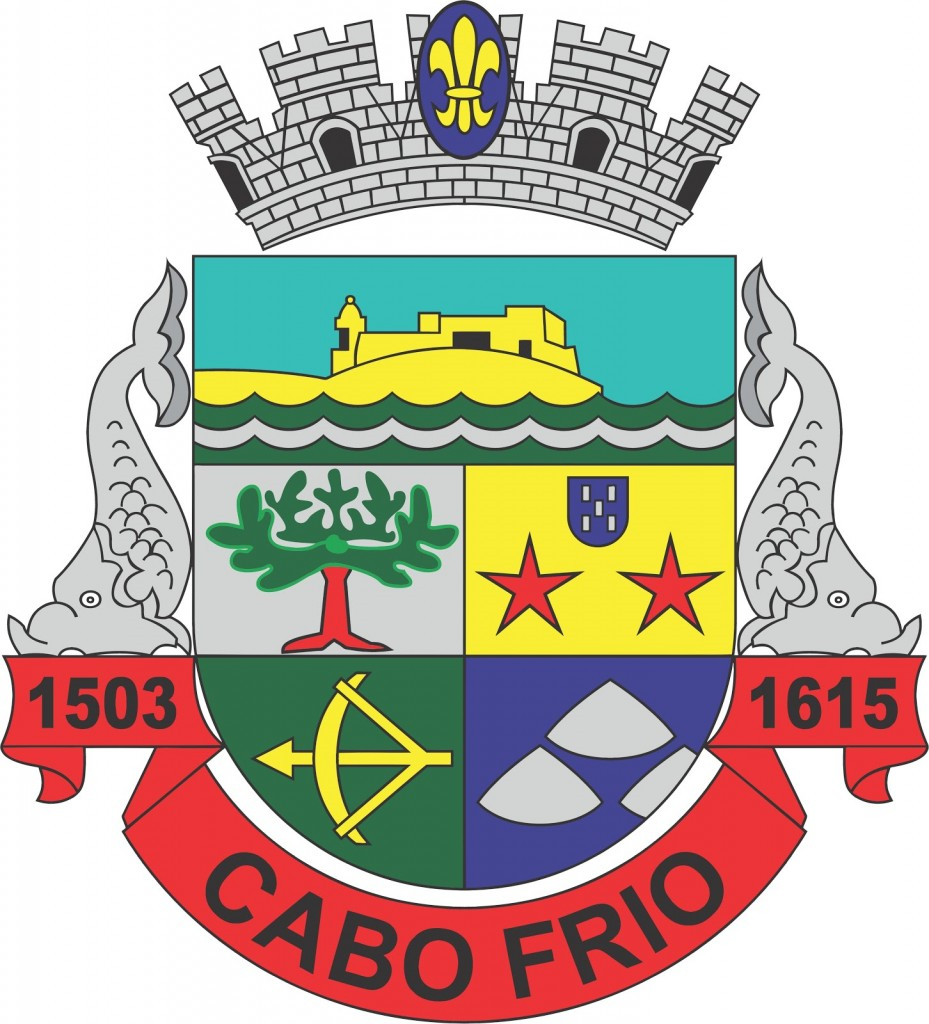
- Flag Coat of arms
- Nickname: "Atlantic Princess"
- Location of Cabo Frio in the state of Rio de Janeiro

- Location of Cabo Frio in Brazil
- Coordinates: 22°52′44″S 42°01′08″W
- Country: Brazil
- Region: Southeast
- State: Rio de Janeiro

Government
  - Mayor: Dr. Serginho (PL)

Area
  - Total: 410.418 km^{2} (158.463 sq mi)
- Elevation: 4 m (13 ft)

Population (2022 Brazilian census)
  - Total: 222,161
  - Estimate (2025): 238,438
  - Density: 541.304/km^{2} (1,401.97/sq mi)
- Time zone: UTC−3 (BRT)
- Website: cabofrio.rj.gov.br

Cabo Frio (Portuguese pronunciation: [ˈkabu ˈfɾi.u], Cold Cape) is a tourist destination located in the state of Rio de Janeiro.

Cabo Frio is unique that it offers both Ocean and Lake beaches.

The Brazilian coast runs east from Rio de Janeiro to Cabo Frio where it turns sharply north. North of Cabo Frio is Cabo de São Tomé.

It was named after the geography of its location, a cape, and because the water temperature is colder than in nearby cities (frio is Portuguese for "cold"). This city features beaches with white fine sand. Due to a lack of mica, the sand stays cool in the sun.

As of 2025, Cabo Frio's estimated population is 238,438 and its area is 410 km^{2}.

== Demography ==
According to the Brazilian Institute of Geography and Statistics, in 2010, Cabo Frio had 90,831 men (48.7%) and 95,396 women (51.3%). The municipality has demonstrated rapid demographic growth over the decades.

=== Ethnicities ===
According to the IBGE, the municipality is made up of 88,701 whites, 72,561 mixed race, 23,555 blacks, 1,109 Asians, and 301 indigenous people.

- Whites - 47.7%
- Pardos - 39%
- Blacks - 12.6%
- Asians - 0.6%
- Indigenous - 0.1%

=== Religion ===
According to the IBGE, the municipality is made up of 78,061 evangelicals, 64,006 Catholics, 32,894 non-religious people (including atheists and agnostics), 6,539 spiritualists, and 6,413 people who profess other religions, such as Judaism, Buddhism, Islam, esotericism, and neopaganism.

- Evangelicals - 41.7%
- Roman Catholics - 34.3%
- Non-religious (including atheists and agnostics) - 17.6%
- Spiritists - 3.5%
- Other religions - 3.4%

== Infrastructure ==
Cabo Frio is served by Cabo Frio International Airport.

== Historical buildings ==
- Our Lady of Assumprion Church
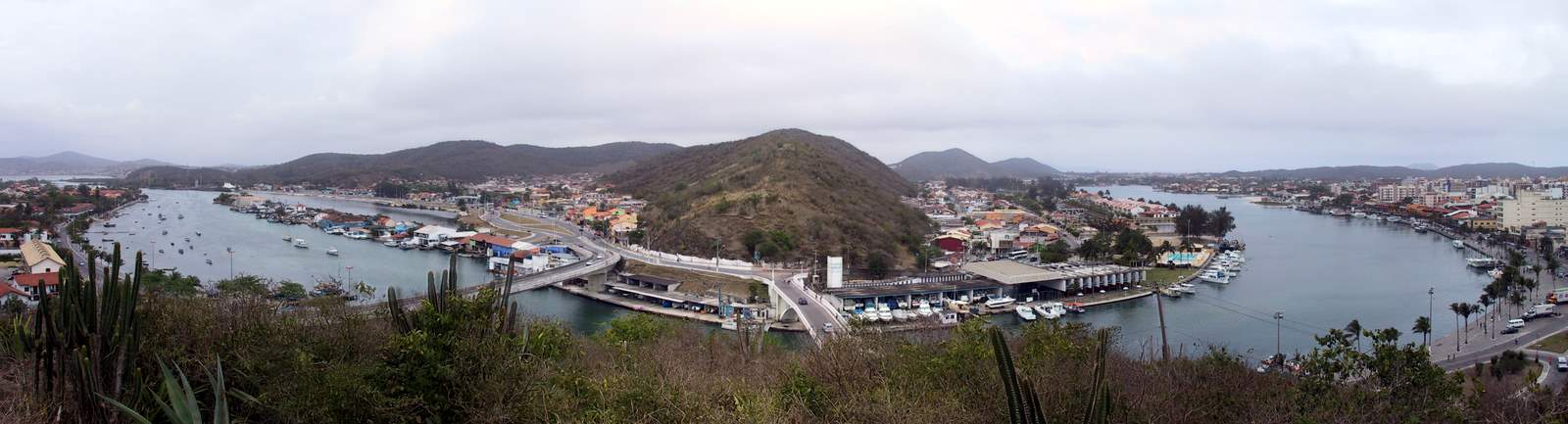
Feliciano Sodré Bridge

== Geography ==
=== Climate ===
Climate data for Cabo Frio, Rio de Janeiro, Brazil
Month	Jan	Feb	Mar	Apr	May	Jun	Jul	Aug	Sep	Oct	Nov	Dec	Year
Mean daily maximum °C (°F)	28.7 (83.7)	29.1 (84.4)	28.8 (83.8)	27.5 (81.5)	26.1 (79.0)	24.9 (76.8)	24.7 (76.5)	24.3 (75.7)	24.3 (75.7)	25.2 (77.4)	26.5 (79.7)	27.9 (82.2)	26.5 (79.7)
Mean daily minimum °C (°F)	22.3 (72.1)	22.7 (72.9)	22.7 (72.9)	21.5 (70.7)	20.0 (68.0)	18.8 (65.8)	18.6 (65.5)	18.7 (65.7)	19.0 (66.2)	19.7 (67.5)	20.7 (69.3)	21.8 (71.2)	20.5 (69.0)
Average rainfall mm (inches)	78.1 (3.07)	44.1 (1.74)	52.8 (2.08)	78.3 (3.08)	69.1 (2.72)	43.9 (1.73)	44.7 (1.76)	36.1 (1.42)	61.0 (2.40)	80.7 (3.18)	81.0 (3.19)	101.1 (3.98)	770.9 (30.35)
Average relative humidity (%)	82	82	82	80	81	81	80	81	81	82	82	82	81
Source: Climate-Charts.com
