= Paraná Jê languages =

Branch of the Jê languages

Paraná Jê
- Geographic distribution: Paraná, Santa Catarina, Rio Grande do Sul, São Paulo, formerly Misiones, Alto Paraná, Canindeyú, Itapúa
- Linguistic classification: Macro-Jê: Jê; Paraná Jê
- Subdivisions: Southern Jê; Ingain †

Language codes
- ISO 639-3: –
- Glottolog: jeme1246

The Paraná Jê languages, also known as Jê of Paraná, are a branch of the Jê languages constituted by the extinct language Ingain and by the Southern Jê languages (Kaingang and Laklãnõ (Xokléng)).
