= Pomba River =

Rio Pomba
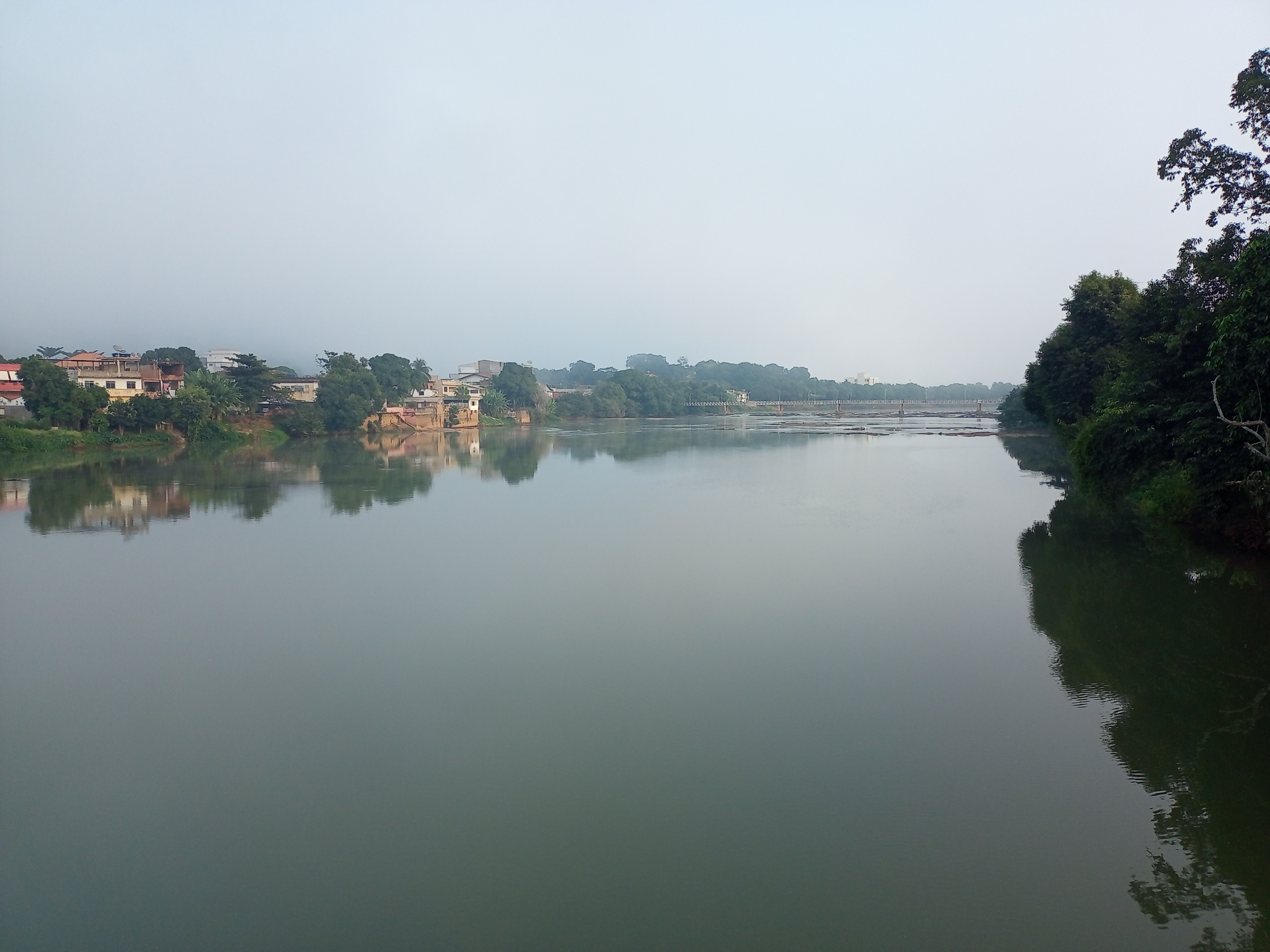
- Pomba River in Santo Antônio de Pádua

- Location within Brazil

Location
- Country: Brazil
- State: Minas Gerais, Rio de Janeiro

Physical characteristics
- Source
  - elevation: 1,100 m (3,600 ft)
- Mouth
  - location: Paraíba do Sul, MG, Brazil
  - coordinates: 21°38′18″S 42°2′59″W
- Length: 305 km (190 mi)

The Rio Pomba is a river of Minas Gerais and Rio de Janeiro states in southeastern Brazil, one of the principle tributaries of the Paraíba do Sul.

== Geography ==
The Rio Pomba begins in the city of Barbacena in Minas Gerais and flows south through the Zona da Mata to empty into the Paraíba do Sul between the towns of Cambuci and Itaocara, Rio de Janeiro. Its main tributaries are the rivers Piau, Xopotó, Pardo, and Formoso. The main cities along its banks are Cataguases in Minas Gerais and Santo Antônio de Pádua in Rio de Janeiro.

== Indigenous peoples ==
In the 18th century, Koropó speakers lived with Coroado Puri speakers along the Pomba River.

== Environmental issues ==
The lands of the Rio Pomba basin are severely deforested, a process that began throughout the Zona da Mata during the coffee era and did not spare even the headwaters of the river. It is a factor that contributes to the degradation of the river and is also affected by the release of industrial and domestic effluents. In 2003, a major spill of more than 1 billion liters of toxic chemical waste from one industry in Cataguases caused enormous environmental damage, and the effect was detected from the Paraiba do Sul River to its mouth in the Atlantic Ocean in the state of Rio de Janeiro.

== See also ==
- List of rivers of Minas Gerais
- List of rivers of Rio de Janeiro
