= Kaingang language =

Southern Je language of southern Brazil

Kaingang
- kanhgág, káiŋãŋ
- Native to: Brazil
- Region: São Paulo, Santa Catarina, Paraná, Rio Grande do Sul
- Ethnicity: Kaingang people
- Native speakers: 18,500 (2012); 27,482 (2022 census)
- Language family: Macro-Jê: Jê; Jê of Paraná; Southern Jê; Kaingang

Language codes
- ISO 639-3: kgp
- Glottolog: kain1271
- ELP: Kaingang

The Kaingang language (also spelled Kaingáng) is a Southern Jê language spoken by the Kaingang people of southern Brazil. The Kaingang nation has about 30,000 people, and about 60–65% speak the language. Most also speak Portuguese.

== Geographic distribution ==
The Kaingang territory occupies the modern states of São Paulo, Paraná, Santa Catarina and Rio Grande do Sul (and, until the beginning of the 20th century, Misiones, Argentina). Today they live in around they indigenous lands (similar to Native American reservations), especially in Rio Grande do Sul and Paraná.

== Documentation ==
In the 1960s, due to a missionary interest conducted by the Summer Institute of Linguistics (SIL), the language was studied by Ursula Wiesemann.

== Names ==
The Kaingang and Xokleng were previously considered a single ethnicity, which went by a number of names, including Amhó, Dorin, Gualachi, Chiqui, Ingain, Botocudo, Ivitorocái (= Amho), Kamé, Kayurukré, Tain (= Ingain), Taven. Some of these may have been tribal names; others were exonyms. Those living along the coast at the time of the Conquest were called Guayaná, and are considered to be the ancestors of the Kaingang. It is unknown to what extent the names might have corresponded to dialectal differences.

== Phonology ==
=== Consonants ===
A large number of allophones map to a set of fourteen phonemes:

		Bilabial	Dental / Alveolar	Palatal	Velar	Glottal
Stop / Nasal	voiceless	p	t		k	ʔ
Stop / Nasal	voiced	m~b	n~d	ɲ~ɟ	ŋ~g	
Fricative / Approximant		ɸ	ɹ	ç~c͡ç	w	h

All consonants have varying allophones depending on their position in the word and on the adjacency of nasal vowels:

- The oral stops have prenasalized allophones [ᵐp, ⁿt, ᵑk] when following a nasal vowel. In unstressed syllables, /k/ is furthermore voiced to become [ᵑɡ].
- The glottal stop /ʔ/ and the non-stop consonants are realized as nasalized [ʔ̃, ɸ̃, ç̃, h̃, w̃, ɹ̃, j̃] preceding nasal vowels.
- The phonemes /b, d, ɟ, ɡ/ are only realized as voiced oral stops between two oral vowels. They are realized as voiced prenasalized stops [ᵐb, ⁿd, ᶮɟ, ᵑɡ] when between a nasal and an oral vowel, as well as word-initially before oral vowels. Between an oral and a nasal vowel they are conversely realized as prestopped [ᵇm, ᵈn, ᶡɲ, ᶢŋ]. Between two nasal vowels, or word-initially before nasal vowels, they are realized as full nasal stops: [m, n, ɲ, ŋ]. The first two types of realization also apply when occurring in the syllable coda and followed by a non-nasal segment; these voiced/prenasalized will however be additionally unreleased: [⁽ᵐ⁾b̚, ⁽ⁿ⁾d̚, ⁽ᶮ⁾ɟ̚, ⁽ᵑ⁾ɡ̚]. However, by convention these stop-phonemes are always written as ⟨m, n, nh, g⟩ in the orthography.
- When preceded by an oral vowel, the sequences /nt, ɲt, ŋk/ can be realized as geminate stops: [tː, cː, kː].
- /ŋ/ is optionally labialized: [ɡʷ, ŋʷ], etc.
- The non-glottal fricatives can word-initially be optionally realized as affricates [p͡ɸ, c͡ç] (including their nasal allophones: [p͡ɸ̃, c͡ç̃].)
- /w/ can optionally be realized as a voiced bilabial fricative [β], and /j/ as a voiced palatal stop [ɟ]. When nasalized, /j/ varies between [j̃] and [ɲ].
- Word-initially, /ɹ/ is preceded by an epenthetic [ə]; it is [ɾ] in tonic syllables and [l] in atonic syllables, and when nasalized, it varies between [ɾ̃] and [ɹ̃]. As a syllable coda it is a flap when oral and approximant when nasal, and may optionally be palatalized: [ɾʲ], [ɹ̃ᶮ].
- Word-initially in a stressed syllable, /t/ may vary in realization between dental [t̪] and alveolar [t]. Following palatal consonants or preceding a close vowel, it can also realized as a palatal stop, [c].
- Word initially /ç/ is realized as [c͡ç]

=== Vowels ===
Vowel phonemes of Kaingang
		Front	Back	
		unrounded	unrounded	rounded
Close	oral	i		u
Close	nasal	ĩ		ũ
Close-mid	oral	e	ɤ	o
Open-mid	oral	ɛ	ʌ	ɔ
Open-mid	nasal	ɛ̃	ʌ̃	ɔ̃
Open	oral		ɑ	

- Atonic /i/ and /e/ as well as /u/ and /o/ are merged; the former pair to [ɪ], the latter pair to [ʊ].
- The backness of the unrounded back vowels /ɤ, ʌ, ɑ/ varies between back [ɤ, ʌ, ɑ] and central [ɘ, ɜ, ɐ].
- All of the oral vowels /i, u, e, ɤ, o, ɛ, ʌ, ɔ, ɑ/ can be realized as voiceless [i̥, u̥, e̥, ɤ̥ ~ ɘ̥, o̥, ɛ̥, ʌ̥ ~ ɜ̥, ɔ̥, ɑ̥ ~ ɐ̥].
- Nasal vowels have the same quality as oral vowels. However, Jolkesky (2009) does not list a central variant of /ʌ̃/ on his phone chart.

== Orthography ==
Wiesemann proposed an alphabet for the language, which is still in use despite some problems. It is based on the Latin script, and consists of fourteen consonants and fourteen vowels, matching the fourteen consonants and fourteen vowels of the Kaingang language.

Vowels		Consonants	
Letter	Sound	Letter	Sound
a	ɑ	f	ɸ
á	ʌ	g	ŋ~ɡ
ã	ɔ̃	h	h
e	e	j	j
é	ɛ	k	k
ẽ	ɛ̃	m	m~b
i	i	n	n~d
ĩ	ĩ	nh	ɲ~ɟ
o	o	p	p
ó	ɔ	r	ɹ
u	u	s	ç
ũ	ũ	t	t
y	ɤ	v	w
ỹ	ʌ̃	ꞌ	ʔ

There are dictionaries and grammars available for Kaingang. A school was set up in 1969 to teach the Kaingang people to read and write their language. However, the school produced many Kaingang speakers who went back to their reservations to teach others and spread the writing innovations they learned. Only one of the dialects is used as the standard written form, though having the writing system provided a source of pride in the language for the Kaingang people. A Kaingang bible has been published, as well as a dictionary and other publications.

== Grammar ==
=== Postpositions ===
Kaingang makes use of postpositions.

- goj: water
- goj ki: in the water

Postpositions are also used to mark subject.

- Mĩg vỹ venhvó tĩ. The jaguar runs.
- Kofá tóg pỹn tãnh. The old man killed the snake.

=== Verbs ===
Kaingang verbs do not inflect.

- rãgró: to plant
- Ti tóg rãgró krãn huri. He planted beans.
- Ẽg tóg rãgró krãn huri. We planted beans.

== Bibliography ==
- D'Angelis, Wilmar R. (1998), Traços de modo e modos de traçar geometrias: línguas Macro-Jê & teoria fonológica, Tese de Doutorado, 2 vols. (in Portuguese), Campinas, Brazil: IEL-Unicamp
- Jolkesky, Marcelo Pinho de Valhery (2009), "Fonologia e prosódia do Kaingáng falado em Cacique Doble", Anais do SETA, 3, Campinas: Editora do IEL-UNICAMP: 675–685
