= Goitacá =

Extinct indigenous people of Brazil

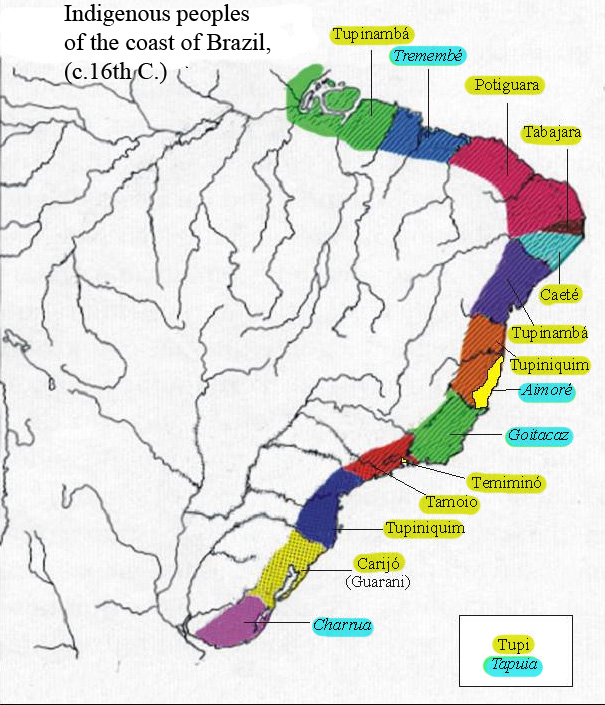
- A map of indigenous peoples of Brazil, c. 1500.

Total population
- extinct as tribe assimilated into various local tribes
- 16th century: 12,000

Regions with significant populations
- Brazil (Espírito Santo, Rio de Janeiro)

Languages
- formerly Waitaká

Religion
- Animism

The Goitacá (or Goytacazes, among other variant spellings "Waytaquazes" "Ouetacá", "Waitaká") were an Indigenous people of Brazil. They are now extinct.

The Goitacá were a "Tapuia" (i.e. non-Tupi) people, one of the few that still remained on the Tupi-dominated coast. They inhabit the coast region between the São Mateus river, in the current state of Espírito Santo, and the Paraíba do Sul river, in the current state of Rio de Janeiro, from the half XVII century to the lat XVIII century, when they got exterminated by the Portuguese colonizers through a smallpox epidemic deliberate spread among them. They were said to be taller and lighter-skinned than the Tupi. Their name may stem from guatá, the Tupi word for "wayfarer" or "runner".

== History ==
In the 16th century, the Goitacá inhabited a large stretch of the eastern Brazilian coast, from the São Mateus River to the Paraíba do Sul River, encompassing what is now the state of Espírito Santo and part of Rio de Janeiro state. They are estimated to have numbered 12,000.

Unlike their Tupi neighbors, the Goitacá were hunter-gatherer people. Their diet consisted primarily of fruits, roots, honey and engaged in a substantial amount of hunting (they were said to be masters of the bow and arrow). They were also one of the few coastal indigenous populations to also engage in fishing as a major activity, and were renowned for their skill in capturing sharks in shallows. While colonizers wrongly presumed the Goitacá were "superstitious" about water sources, their practice of drinking water only from freshly-dug wells, and never from streams or rivers, was based on their knowledge of how to avoid water-borne illness.

The Goitacá painted themselves with dyes from the genipapo fruit and adorned themselves and their objects with bird feathers, but otherwise went around naked. They did not cut their hair, but let it grow into long manes, shaving only a small circle in the front. They had a degree of craftsmanship in clay and bamboo, and made bows and arrows, stone axes, rafts and fishing nets made of fiber and coir.

The Goitacá were divided into three general rival hordes, the Goitacá-guassu, the Goitacá-moppi and the Goitacá-jacoritô. They are said to have fought each other incessantly, and that the "guassu" (meaning "great") were the more numerous and dominant of the three.

The Goitacá had a fearsome reputation as fierce and cruel warriors, characterized by English adventurer Anthony Knivet (c. 1597) as "the most odious people of the Universe". The Europeans also alleged that they engaged in cannibalism. But contemporary European commentators claimed that while the Tupi ate purely out of ritual, the Goitacá, as alleged by Simão de Vasconcellos, ate for pleasure, having acquired a taste for human flesh.

There is little or no information about the elusive Goitacá beyond these early accounts and allegations, mostly derived by hearsay from their neighbors or fearful colonists, rather than direct familiarity. As Fr. Vicente do Salvador wrote in his 1627 account, "These and other incredible things that are told about these people, believe as you will, because no man who was once in their power, has yet returned with his life to tell about it." The negative descriptions of the Goitacá, as found in the early writings, are maybe quite unjust.

A shy people, the Goitacá avoided all interaction or contact with European colonists. They did, however, engage in barter trade with them, principally by leaving their trade goods in a clearing, and then falling back and watching from a distance as the colonists picked up the goods and dropped off theirs. Their principal trade items were honey, wax, fish, game and fruits, which they bartered for iron goods like sickles, brandy and beads.

With the 1534 partition of colonial Brazil into separate hereditary captaincies, the large Goitacá territory came under three captaincies: Espírito Santo, São Tomé and São Vicente. Nothing was attempted in the latter, but colonial settlements were erected in the first two in 1535–36. The natives ignored the Portuguese at first, but after a couple of thoughtless slave raids by the colonists, the Goitacá overran and destroyed the colonies in the 1540s. After repeated assaults, the São Tomé captain Pêro de Góis finally gave up the enterprise and abandoned Brazil. Vasco Fernandes Coutinho, captain of Espírito Santo, held on only by transferring his colony to the defensible island of Vitória.

By their belligerence, the Goitacá managed to keep their lands free of European colonies for some time, and it is said their dominions were sanctuaries for European criminals and fugitives, who knew the colonial authorities would not chase after them there. But colonial pressure would not stay its hand for long - particularly as the Goitacá dominions blocked the path between the growing southern colonies like Rio de Janeiro and eastern colonies like Salvador da Bahia. Seeing no way to encroach on their land peacefully, a campaign of extermination against the Goitacá was launched. Initially these were manhunts by the Portuguese colonists (one of which Knivet participated and described), but soon became more systematic, e.g. by leaving poisoned brandy and smallpox-diseased blankets to be picked up by the Goitacá. As the campaigns advanced, the Goicatá retreated away from the coast and deeper into the interior. By the late 18th century, the bulk were practically exterminated, and remaining survivors gradually merged into other tribes.

== Legacy ==
The Campos dos Goytacazes municipality in the state of Rio de Janeiro is named after them.
