= Kimdá language =

Jê language

Guayana
- Wayaná, Gualachí
- Native to: Brazil
- Region: Santa Catarina
- Ethnicity: Guayana
- Extinct: (date missing)
- Language family: Macro-Ge: Ge; Southern (Kaingáng); Guayana

Language codes
- ISO 639-3: None (mis)
- Glottolog: kimd1235

Kimdá, Guayana (Wayaná), or Gualachi, is an extinct Jê language of Brazil.
