= Cabo de São Tomé =

Peninsula in Brazil

Coordinates: 21.9917°S 40.9283°W

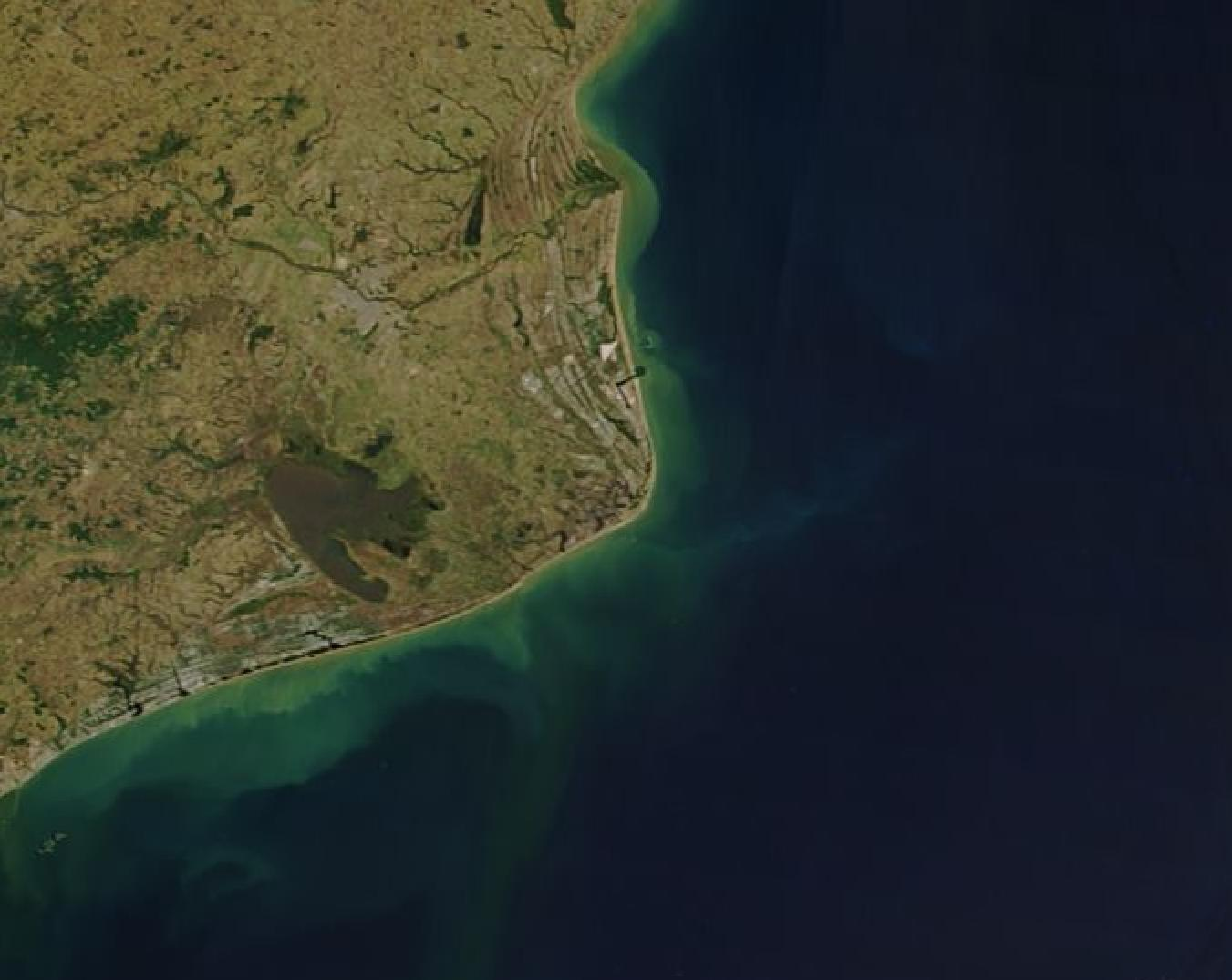
A Satellite picture of Cabo de São Tomé.

The Cabo de São Tomé is a peninsula in the state of Rio de Janeiro, on the coast of southeastern Brazil. It is 40 km southeast of the city of Campos dos Goytacazes. Further southeast is Cabo Frio where the coast turns east toward Rio de Janeiro. The cape was formed by sediment deposited by the Rio Paraiba do Sul. It was first sighted by Europeans in 1501.
