= Kaingang =

Indigenous people of Brazil

kanhgág
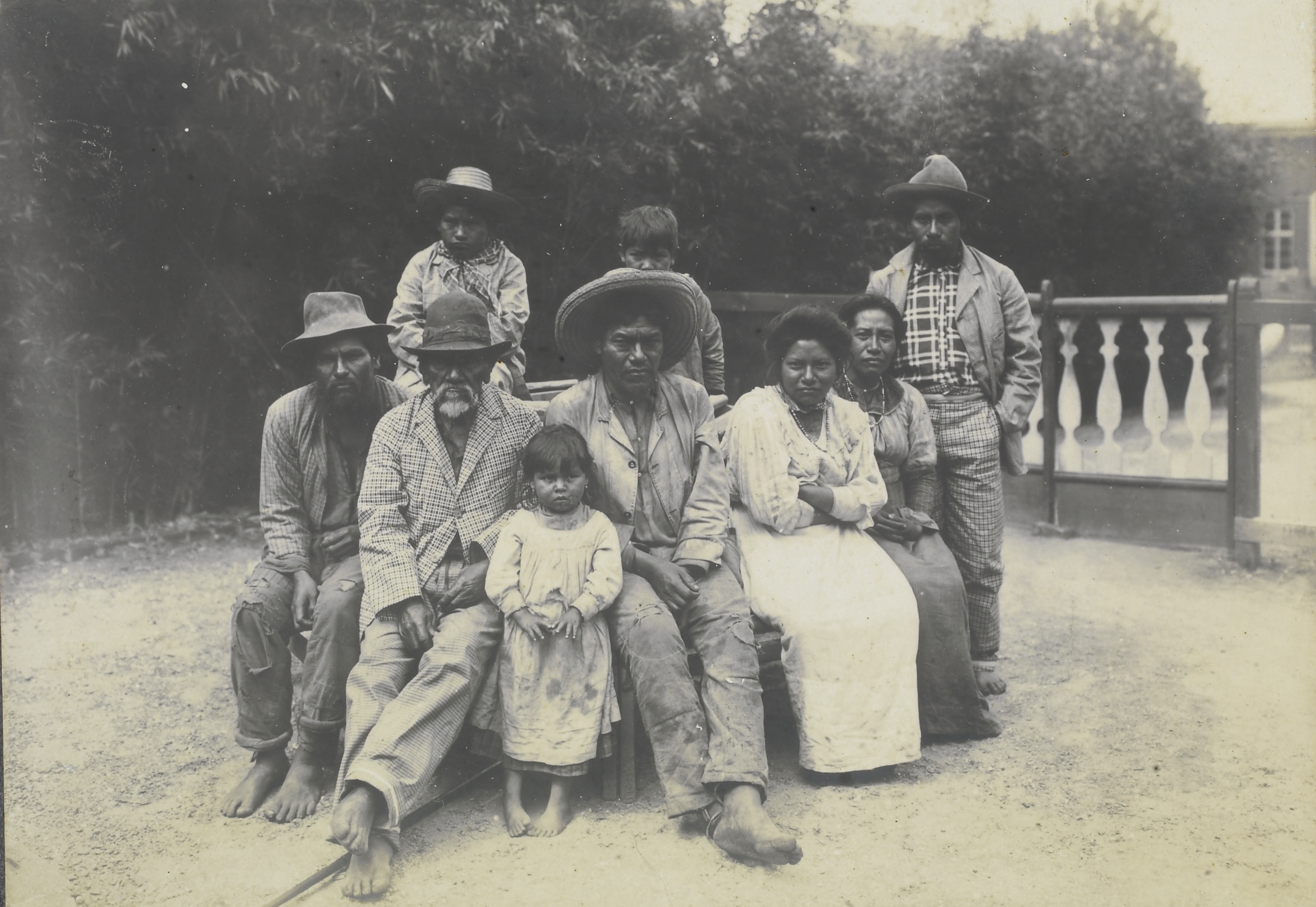
- Caingangue Indians (1910).

Total population
- 51,000 (2022)

Regions with significant populations
- Paraná, Santa Catarina, Rio Grande do Sul, São Paulo (Brazil)

Languages
- Kaingang language

The Kaingang people are an Indigenous Brazilian ethnic group spread out over the three southern Brazilian states of Paraná, Santa Catarina and Rio Grande do Sul and the southeastern state of São Paulo. Their population was around 51,000 in 2022.

== Names ==
Kaingang is spelled caingangue in Portuguese, and kanhgág in the Kaingang language. It is also sometimes rendered as Aaingang or Caingang.

The Kaingang have sometimes been grouped with the Aweikoma (Xokleng), although they are now considered separate groups.

== Culture and language ==
The Kaingang people were the original first inhabitants of the province of Misiones in Argentina. Their language and culture is quite distinct from the neighboring Guaraní.

The Kaingang society is divided in two exogamic groups, kamé and kanhru (or kairu), understood in Kaingang worldview as the two originating halves of the world, nature and humanity. Kamé is associated with téi (lines), and people of kamé marking paint their face and bodies with parallel straight lines and zigzags. Kanhru marking is associated with rór (dots), and they paint dots and concentric circles. Kamé people of mixed ancestry of other indigenous ethnicities are called wónhetky, and kanhru mixed is called votor. The markings are patrilineal: if a father is kamé, his children are kamé too, for instance. If the father of a Kaingang child is not Kaingang himself, the child gets their marking from the maternal grandfather.

It has been stated that the Kaingang rarely live long in one place causing them to move a lot, but some sources, such as Juracilda Veiga and ethnographic registers (José Francisco Tomás do Nascimento 1886, Telêmaco Borba 1908 etc.), indicate that Kaingang groups have a crucial relation with the land where they were born and their ancestors were buried.

The Kaingang language is a member of the Jê family.

== Copel agreement ==
In November 2006 Brazil's state-owned power company, Copel, agreed to compensate the group 6.5 million dollars for operating a small hydro plant in the Apucaraninha Reservation. The company finally gave in to a settlement after the natives carried two barrels full of fuel into the plant's machine room and threatened to destroy the plant.

This is part of a larger trend of indigenous groups challenging energy projects according to Platts.

== See also ==
- Indigenous people of Brazil

== Footnotes ==
Murdock, 1949.
