= Coroado Puri dialect =

Extinct dialect of Puri

Coroado Puri
- Native to: Brazil
- Ethnicity: Coroado Purí people
- Extinct: late 19th century?
- Language family: Purian: Coroado Puri

Language codes
- ISO 639-3: –
- Glottolog: coro1249

Coroado Purí is an extinct dialect of eastern Brazil. It was mutually intelligible with, and thus a dialect of, Puri.

== Vocabulary ==
=== Numerals ===
Numeral	Coroado
1	tschambiüan
2	tschíri
3	pa-tapacun
4	pa-pamdé
10	tschabrandáitsche
