= Genocide of Indigenous peoples in Brazil =

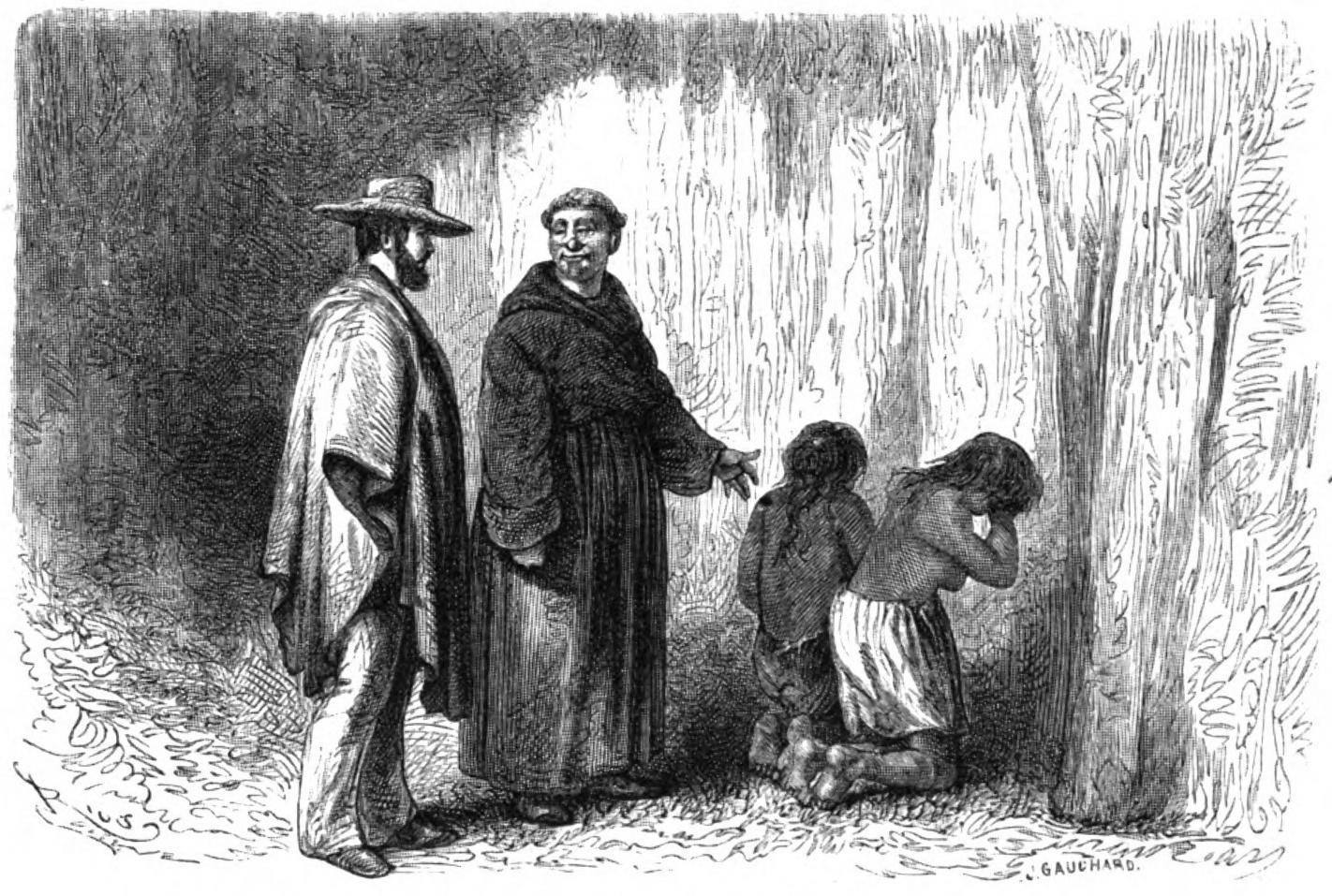
Sketch of penance being imposed on two Ticuna girls by a European priest in Brazil

The genocide of Indigenous peoples in Brazil began with the Portuguese colonization of the Americas, when Pedro Álvares Cabral made landfall in what is now the country of Brazil in 1500. This started the process that led to the depopulation of the Indigenous peoples, because of disease and violent treatment by Portuguese settlers, and their gradual replacement with colonists from Europe and enslaved peoples from Africa. This process has been described as a genocide, and continues into the modern era with the ongoing destruction of Indigenous peoples of the Amazonian region.

Several non-governmental organizations (NGOs) have been formed due to the ongoing persecution of the Indigenous peoples in Brazil, and international pressure has been brought to bear on the state after the release of the Figueiredo Report which documented massive human rights violations.

The abuses have been described as genocide, ethnocide and cultural genocide.

== Affected tribes ==
Over eighty indigenous tribes were destroyed between 1900 and 1957, and the overall indigenous population declined by over eighty percent, from over one million to around two hundred thousand. The 1988 Brazilian Constitution recognises indigenous peoples' right to pursue their traditional ways of life and to the permanent and exclusive possession of their "traditional lands", which are demarcated as Indigenous Territories. In practice, however, Brazil's indigenous people still face a number of external threats and challenges to their continued existence and cultural heritage. The process of demarcation is slow—often involving protracted legal battles—and FUNAI do not have sufficient resources to enforce the legal protection on indigenous land.

In the 1940s, the state and the Indian Protection Service (Serviço de Proteção aos Índios, SPI) forcibly relocated the Aikanã, Kanôc, Kwazá and Salamái tribes to work on rubber plantations. During the journey many of the indigenous peoples starved to death; those who survived the journey were placed in an IPS settlement called Posto Ricardo Franco. These actions resulted in the near extinction of the Kanôc tribe.

Since the 1980s there has been an increase in the exploitation of the Amazon Rainforest for mining, logging and cattle ranching, posing a severe threat to the region's indigenous population. Settlers illegally encroaching on indigenous land continue to destroy the environment necessary for indigenous peoples' traditional ways of life, provoke violent confrontations and spread disease. Peoples such as the Akuntsu and Kanoê have been brought to the brink of extinction within the last three decades.

The ethnocide of the Yanomami has been well documented; there are an estimated nine thousand currently living in Brazil in the Upper Orinoco drainage and a further fifteen thousand in Venezuela. The NGO Survival International has reported that throughout the 1980s up to 6,000 gold prospectors entered Yanomami territory bringing diseases the Yanomami had no immunity to, the prospectors shot them and destroyed entire villages, and Survival International estimates that up to twenty per cent of the people were dead within seven years. During this period massacres such as the Haximu massacre were also perpetrated by prospectors and miners. During the presidency of Jair Bolsonaro a humanitarian crisis occurred where a series of mass deaths, famine, forced displacements and other major human rights violations took place in the Yanomami Indigenous Territory.

In March 1988 the Ticuna people were subjected to a massacre. Since 1994 it has been treated by the Brazilian courts as a genocide, and in 2001, thirteen men were convicted for perpetrating the genocide.

The Uru-Eu-Wau-Wau, whose territory has been protected by law since 1991, saw an influx of an estimated 800 people in 2007. The tribal leaders met with the civil authorities and demanded the trespassers be evicted. This tribe, initially contacted in 1981, saw a severe decline in population after disease was introduced by settlers and miners. Their numbers are now estimated at a few hundred.

In July 2022, the Man of the Hole, who was totally isolated for 26 years and was his uncontacted tribe's last survivor of genocide, died. He lived in Tanaru Indigenous Territory in Rondônia state. The Observatory for the Human Rights of Uncontacted and recently-contacted Peoples called for the territory to be permanently protected as a memorial to Indigenous Genocide.

== Portuguese colonization ==
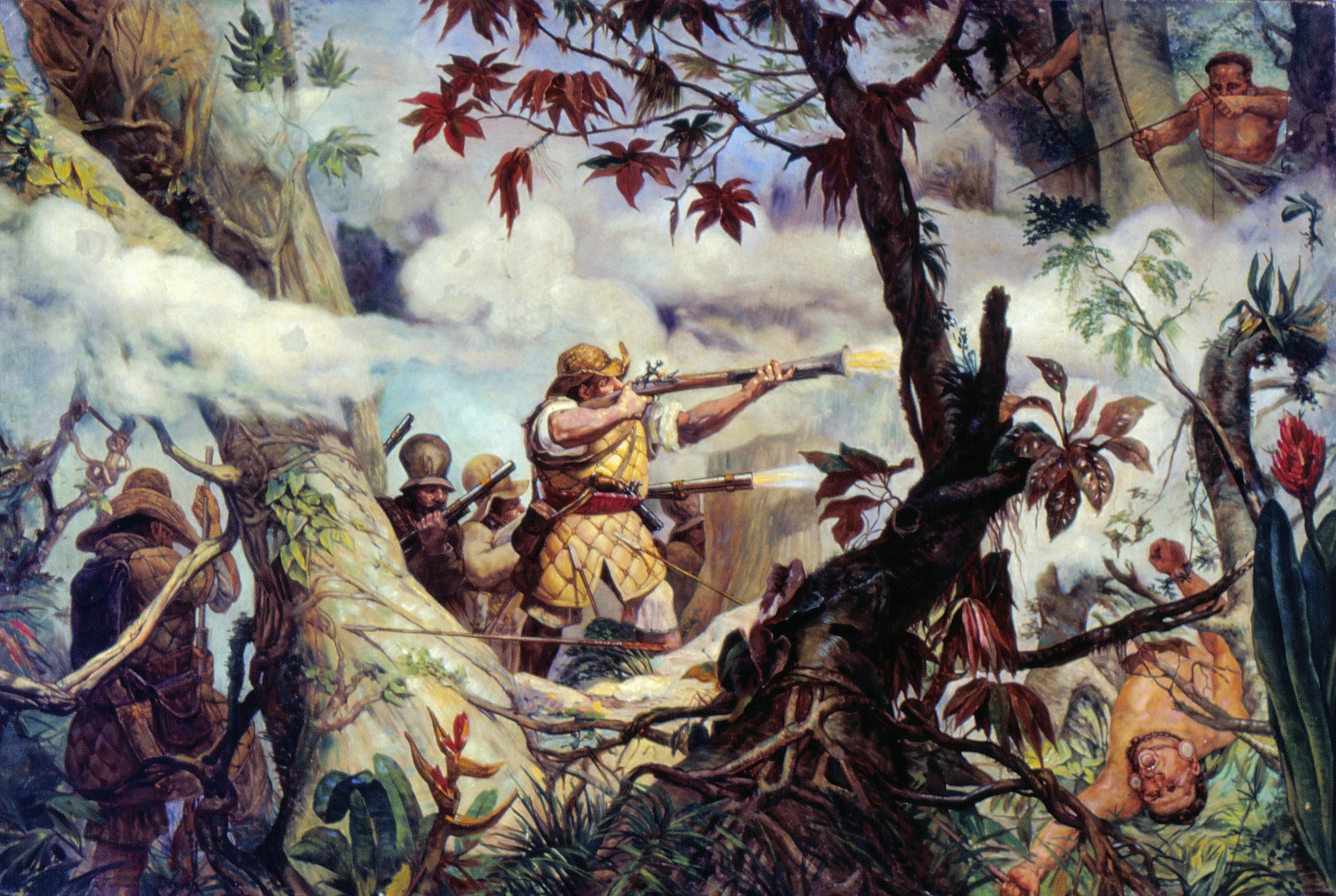
Battle of the militia of Mogi das Cruzes and the Botocudos

During the Portuguese colonization of the Americas, Cabral made landfall off the Atlantic coast. Over the following decade the indigenous Tupí, Tapuya, Caeté, Goitacá and other tribes which lived along the coast suffered large depopulation due to disease and violence. A process of miscegenation between Portuguese settlers and indigenous women also occurred. It is estimated that of the 2.5 million indigenous peoples who had lived in the region which now comprises Brazil, less than 10 percent survived to the 1600s. A primary reason for depopulation was diseases such as smallpox that advanced far beyond movement of European settlers, anthropologist and historian Darcy Ribeiro highlights how the majority of these deaths occurred initially due to European diseases spreading from the Portuguese colonisers to indigenous peoples, but that this was just a precursor to later, more horrendous, ethnocide and genocide.

== 20th and 21st century ==
Number of cases of violence against indigenous people in Brazil during the Bolsonaro administration, from 2019 to 2022

Anti-indigenous sentiment and violence has persisted into the 21st century. From 2007 to 2017, 833 indigenous people were murdered according to the Special Secretariat for Indigenous Health.

Genocide scholars have identified actions by Brazil in the 20th century as actions of genocide.

The deforestation of the Amazon rainforest has been highlighted as a driving factor in the destruction of indigenous peoples in Brazil and the wider Amazon region.

Genocide scholar Adam Jones and historian Wendy Lower characterize the killing of men and the sexual abuse and enslavement of women from indigenous groups as not just genocide but as an example of gendercide perpetrated by the Brazilian state.

On 13 November 2012, the Articulation of Indigenous Peoples of Brazil (APIB) submitted to the United Nations a human rights document with complaints about new proposed laws in Brazil that would further undermine their rights if approved.

During Jair Bolsonaro's administration the damage to the Amazon caused by government policies and the targeting of indigenous peoples has widely been described by indigenous groups, human rights groups, politicians, academics and journalists as an ecocide and a genocide. Indigenous chiefs and human rights organizations have submitted an Article 15 communication to the International Criminal Court for crimes against humanity and genocide for harm to Indigenous people and destruction of the Amazon. While another has been submitted for ecocide by indigenous chiefs. From 2019 to 2022, during the Bolsonaro administration, an average of one indigenous person suffered violence every day. With around 373.8 cases of violence against this population per year, the figure represents a significant increase compared to the previous four-year period (54%), under the governments of Michel Temer and Dilma Rousseff, when the average was 242.5 cases per year, according to a report by the Indigenous Missionary Council (Cimi).

== State reaction ==
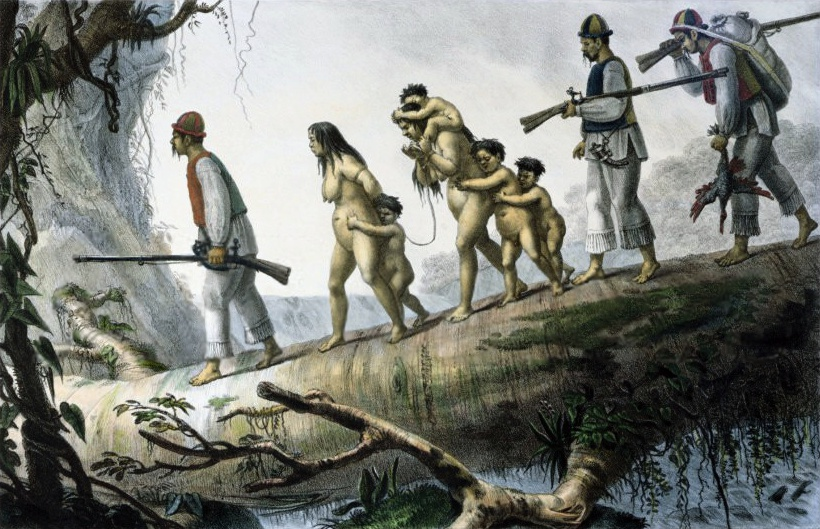
Painting by Jean-Baptiste Debret depicting bandeiras enslaving Guaraní people in the Brazilian interior

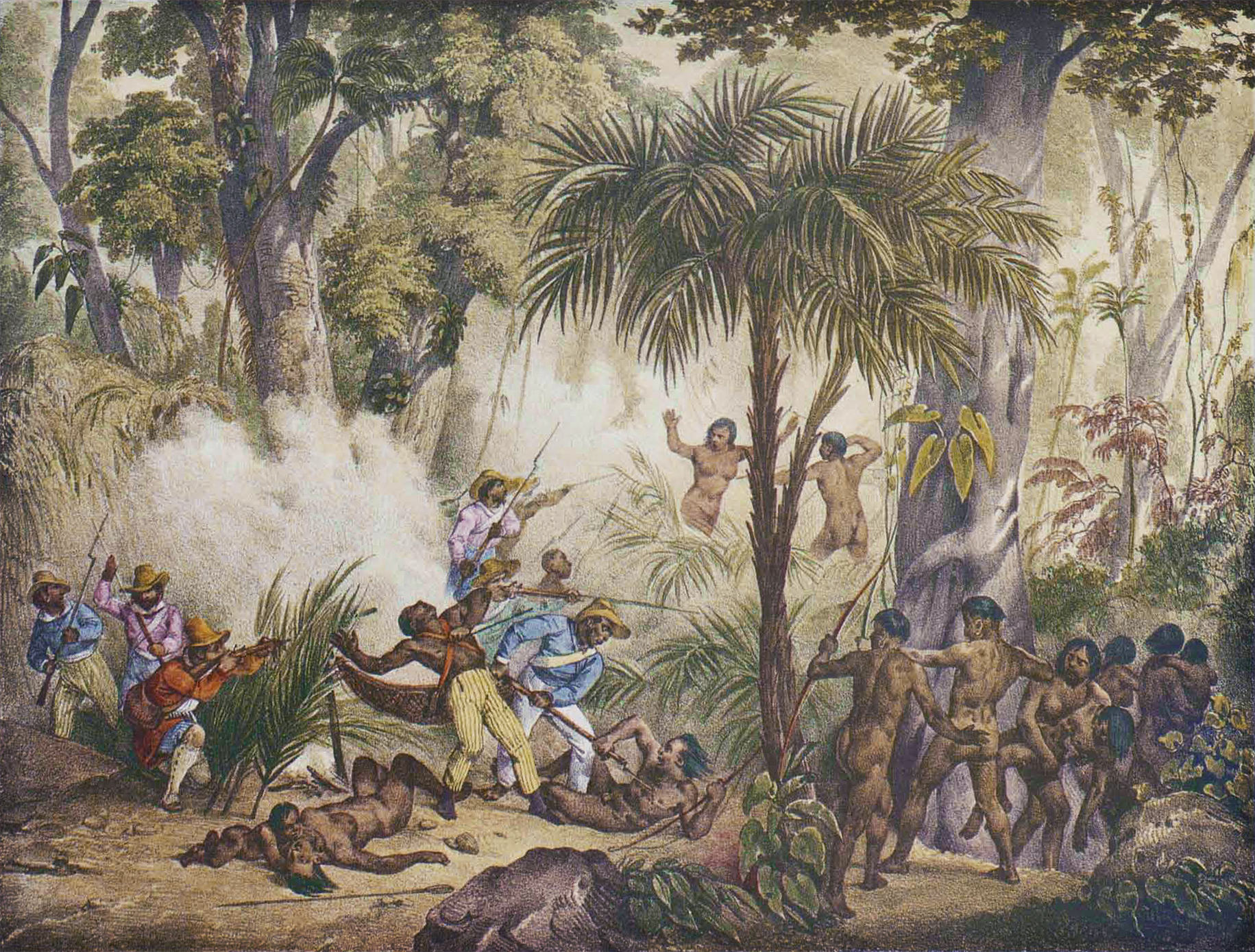
Painting showing Brazilians fighting indigenous people, by Johann Moritz Rugendas, 1835

In 1952, Brazil ratified the genocide convention and incorporated into their penal laws article II of the convention. While the statute was being drafted, Brazil argued against the inclusion of cultural genocide, claiming that some minority groups may use it to oppose the "normal assimilation" which occurs in a new country. According to professor of law at Vanderbilt University Larry May, the argument put forward by Brazil was significant, but cultural genocide should not be cast aside, and this type of genocide should be included within the definition of genocide.

In 1967, public prosecutor, Jader de Figueiredo Correia, submitted the Figueiredo Report to the dictatorship which was then ruling the country. The report, which ran to seven thousand pages, remained hidden for over forty years. Its release caused an international furor. The rediscovered documents were examined by the National Truth Commission, which was tasked with the investigations of human rights violations which occurred in the periods 1947 through to 1988. The report reveals that the SPI had enslaved indigenous people, tortured children and stolen land. The Truth Commission was of the opinion that entire tribes in Maranhão were completely eradicated and in Mato Grosso, where in the Massacre at the 11th Parallel thirty Cinturão Largo were attacked, leaving only two survivors. The report also states that landowners and members of the SPI had entered isolated villages and deliberately introduced smallpox. Of the one hundred and thirty four people accused in the report the state has as yet not tried a single one. The report also detailed instances of mass killings, rapes, and torture. Figueiredo stated that the actions of the SPI had left the indigenous peoples near extinction. The state abolished the SPI following the release of the report. The Red Cross launched an investigation after further allegations of ethnic cleansing were made after the SPI had been replaced. According to Alonso Gurmendi, the investigation report concluded that the indigenous peoples experience acculturation, while hiding genocide: "...the ICRC helped Brazil hide its own neocolonial genocide of indigenous people as not genocide despite the findings of the Figueiredo Report."

In 1969, Brazil's permanent representative to the UN argued that Brazil could not be charged with genocide against the indigenous peoples of the Amazon as "since the criminal parties involved never eliminated the Indians as an ethnic or cultural group […] there was lacking the special malice or motivation necessary to characterize the occurrence of genocide.".

In 1992, a group who had been prospecting for gold were tried for the attempted genocide of the Yanomami tribe. A report from an anthropologist, which was submitted as evidence during the trial, stated that the prospectors' entry into Yanomami territory had an adverse effect on their lives, as the prospectors carried diseases. They had also contaminated the rivers which the Yanomami used as a source of food. The UN reported that thousands of the Yanomami have been killed as the Brazilian government failed to enforce the law and that, even after the Yanomami peoples' territory had been demarcated, the state had not provided the necessary resources to stop the illegal incursion of gold prospectors. These prospectors have caused massive forest fires which have led to the destruction of extensive areas of both croplands and rainforest.

In 2014, Volume II, Chapter 5 of the official report of the National Truth Commission acknowledged the deaths of at least 8,000 indigenous people during the period under investigation and made 13 recommendations to redress the situation, beginning with a public apology from the Brazilian State to the indigenous peoples, and including "creation of a specific truth commission for indigenous issues; a commemorative date for the events that occurred; the creation of museums; production of didactic and audiovisual material to be shared in schools, on television, and on the internet; the implementation of actions to preserve the culture of indigenous peoples; delivery of all kinds of documents from the dictatorship to these peoples; and the return of territories taken from them". Few, if any, of these recommendations have been implemented.

== International reaction ==
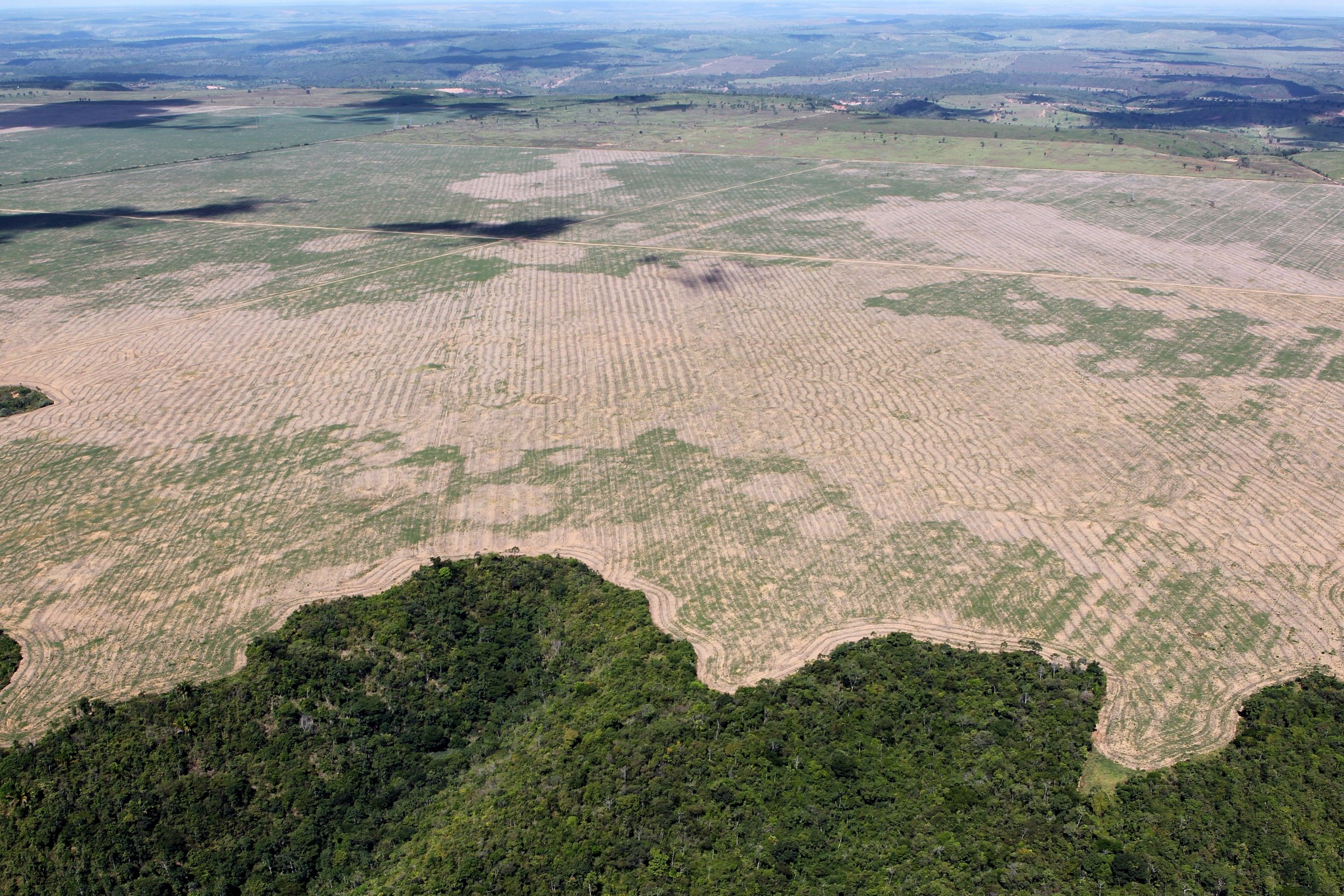
Deforestation of the Amazon rainforest in the state of Maranhão

At the 1992 Earth Summit in Brazil, the Kari-Oka Declaration and the Indigenous Peoples Earth Charter were presented by the representatives of indigenous peoples from around the world. The Kari-Oka Declaration states "We continue to maintain our rights as peoples despite centuries of deprivation, assimilation and genocide". The declaration also asserted that the genocide convention must be amended so as to include the genocide of indigenous peoples. The International Work Group for Indigenous Affairs (IWGIA) was founded in 1968 in response to the genocide of indigenous peoples in Brazil and Paraguay, and in 1969 Survival International was founded in London as a response to the atrocities, theft of land and genocide occurring in the Brazilian Amazon. In 1972 anthropologists from Harvard University founded Cultural Survival.

The World Bank has been subject to criticism over loans which have been used to help fund the dislocation of indigenous peoples and environmental destruction. The Polonoreste project caused wholesale deforestation, ecological damage on a wide scale, as well as the forced relocation of indigenous communities. The project led to an international campaign that resulted in the World Bank suspending loans.

== See also ==
- List of extinct Indigenous peoples of Brazil
- Genocide of Indigenous peoples in Paraguay
- Genocide of indigenous peoples in Venezuela
- Taíno genocide
- Putumayo genocide
