= Figueiredo Report =

1967 Brazilian government report

Report

The Figueiredo Report is an investigative report by public prosecutor Jader de Figueiredo Correia, published in 1967, detailing the crimes committed by the Indian Protection Service (Serviço de Proteção ao Índio) against the native peoples of Brazil. The report had been commissioned by Minister of the Interior Albuquerque Lima, but had minimal repercussions for those involved. The report uncovered numerous incidents of genocide, torture, abduction, enslavement, biological and chemical warfare, sexual abuse, and land theft committed upon the Indigenous peoples in Brazil, thereby documenting in part the genocide of Indigenous peoples in Brazil.

The Figueiredo commission investigated many of the massacres committed against Indigenous groups, such as the Massacre at 11th Parallel against the Cinta Larga people and the mass poisoning with sugar laced with arsenic of the Tapayuna people. International human rights organization Survival International was founded in 1969, after Norman Lewis published excerpts of the reports in the Sunday Times.

The then Brazilian minister of the Interior, Albuquerque Lima sacked more than 50 government officials after the report was published. A new Indian protection agency, Fundação Nacional do Índio was formed to replace the Serviço de Proteção ao Índio.

The report, which was considered to have been lost in a fire in 1967, was rediscovered in December 2012 in the Museum of the Indian (Museu do Índio), as part of the archival investigations of the Brazilian National Truth Commission. It consists of more than 7,000 pages, divided into 30 chapters (one of the chapters is lost), and was not publicly available until more than four decades after its publication.

== See also ==
- Cinta Larga people
- Indigenous peoples of Brazil
- Genocide of Indigenous peoples in Brazil
- Norman Lewis
- Survival International
