= Genocide of Indigenous peoples in Venezuela =

Indigenous genocides in Venezuela

Since 2003, the Venezuelan State considers the treatment of Latin American Indigenous peoples during the Spanish colonization as "genocide".

In 2006 the Brazilian justice called the Haximu massacre against 16 inhabitants Yanomami on the Brazil-Venezuela border a "genocide", the only legal case in both countries whose verdict has been named with that term.

== Massacres ==
=== Murder of Makiritares ===
Colonel Tomás Funes, known as the Devil of Río Negro, enslaved Indigenous inhabitants of the area. There are records that record the death of some 2,000 makiritare Indigenous inhabitants due to their repressive actions between 1913 and 1921.

=== Haximu Massacre ===
The Haximu massacre, also known as the Yanomami massacre, was an armed conflict in Brazil in 1993. The conflict occurred just outside Haximu, Brazil, near the Venezuelan border, beginning in mid-June or July of 1993. Sixteen Yanomami people were killed by a group of garimpeiros, or gold miners who mine the land illegally.

In the first attack, the garimpeiros killed four or five young men of the Yanomami Haximu-teri. In response, the natives made two raids against the miners, killing at least two of them and wounding two more. Following this raid, the garimpeiros attacked again, killing about 12 Yanomami (almost all of them elderly, youths or infants) and burned down the Haximu village.

== Cultural genocide ==
=== Forced assimilation ===
The term "spiritual conquest" exists and has been used to refer to the religious indoctrination exercised by secular religious orders in Venezuela towards the Indigenous inhabitants.

=== Forced displacements ===
During the dictatorship of Juan Vicente Gómez the Indigenous communities were stripped of their lands, according to Eduardo Galeano.

== Current situation ==
According to the United Nations Commission on Human Rights, "comparable pressures from Venezuela have also driven indigenous people from their traditional lands" to places where they simply "disappear".

Luisa Ortega Díaz, who was attorney general of the nation during the third presidency of Hugo Chávez and the first of Nicolás Maduro, denounced in 2018 that in Venezuela "there is a genocide, a deliberate plan by Maduro, Chávez's heir, to exterminate the population and those who do not submit, do not subordinate themselves; they persecute, they annihilate or force them to leave the country".

== Indigenous resistance to genocide ==
Antonio Flores, mayor of the islands and coast of Tierra Firme, ordered the hanging of cacique Melchor, of the Gulf of Cariaco and current Guayana, as well as the murder of Coriana, an indigenous woman. The Carib, Tagar, and Aruaca Indigenous peoples confronted the Spanish Empire in a rebellion in Cumaná in 1520, which lasted six days, burning the missions of the Franciscan and Dominican orders, and murdering in revenge 14 Spanish crew members and several captains, with their fleets, which numbered more than 50 men, in addition of two Dominican friars. The Spanish inhabitants of Cubagua and Margarita fled to island of Hispaniola.

== Memory and legacy ==
In Venezuela, the dictatorship of Juan Vicente Gómez, with a positivist tendency, declared October 12 as Día de la Raza in 1921, also celebrating the so-called discovery of America until 2002. Over the years this name became perceived racist. In 2002 the National Assembly changed its name to the current Day of Indigenous Resistance, taking into consideration the multiethnic character of the nation and the decolonization. In Spain, in contrast, October 12 is celebrated as the National Day of Spain since 1892, with military parades.

In 2003, President Hugo Chávez declared: “Christopher Columbus was the leader of an invasion that produced not a massacre but a genocide. Ninety million aborigines lived on this land, 200 years later three million remained. What was that? A genocide".

In 2021, President Nicolás Maduro declared: "We ask King Philip to change his position against historical cases and apologize for the 300-year genocide against indigenous peoples on the American continent", similar to president Andrés Manuel López Obrador's request for Mexico in 2019.

In 2022, the Maduro government installed a "commission for the clarification of the historical truth, justice and reparation regarding colonial rule and its consequences" and to "demand justice and reparation from Spain, Portugal and all of Europe for Latin America".

== See also ==
- Taíno genocide
- Genocide of Indigenous peoples in Brazil
- Genocide of Indigenous peoples in Paraguay
