= Camarão Indians' letters =

Letters sent in Brazil in 1645

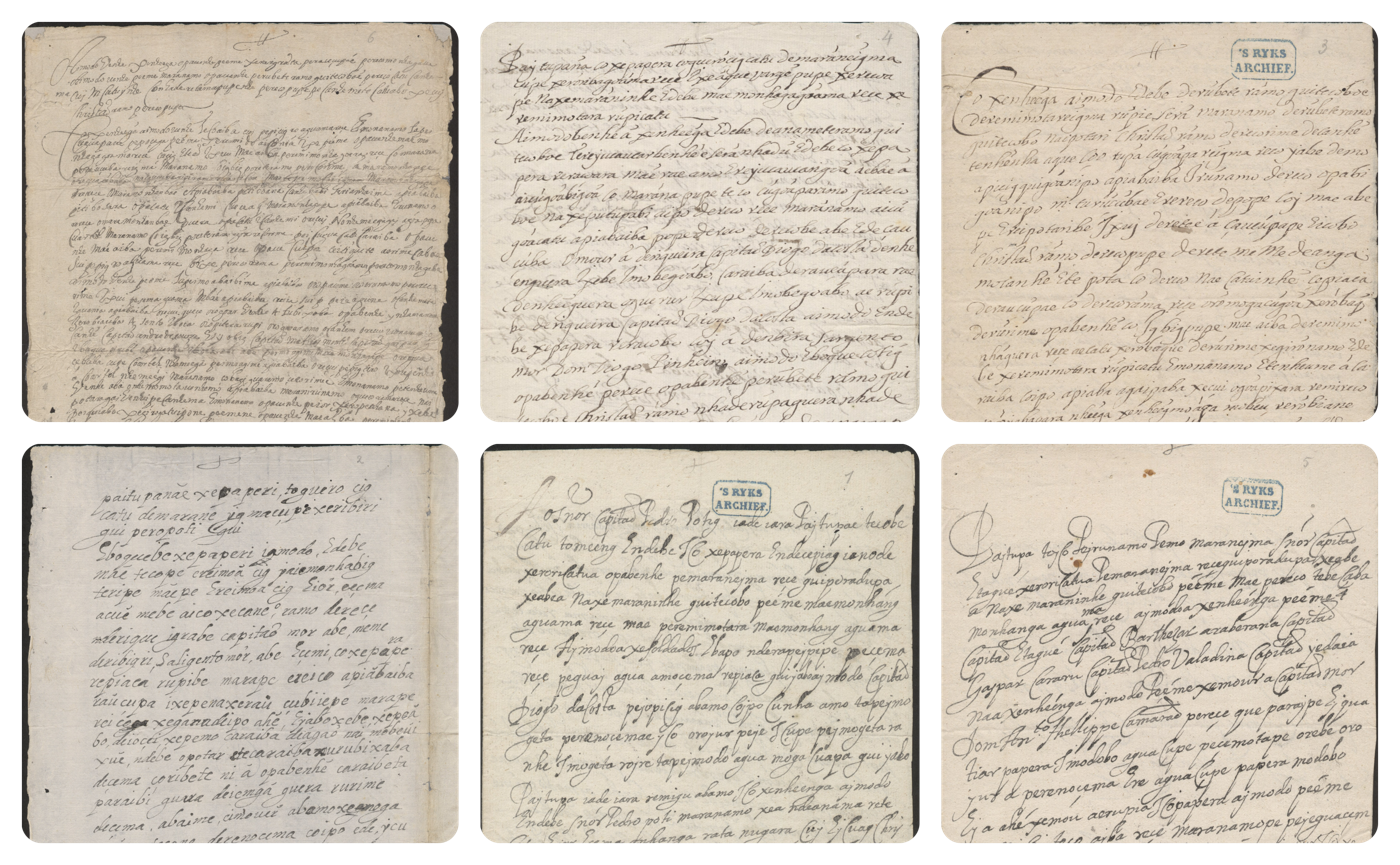
The six Camarão Indians' letters

Camarão Indians' letters (Portuguese: cartas dos índios Camarões), also known as Tupi letters from Camarão Indians (Portuguese: cartas tupis dos Camarões), are a series of six letters exchanged between Potiguara Indians during 1645, in the first half of the 17th century, in the context of the Dutch invasions of Brazil. They are the only known texts written by Brazilian Indians until the Independence of Brazil. The Camarão Indians' letters are also the only record of Old Tupi writing in Colonial Brazil. Today, the correspondence is stored in the archives of the Royal Library of the Netherlands, and has been preserved there for almost 400 years.

Although the correspondence had been known since 1885 and there have been previous attempts at translation, the complete decipherment of its contents was only published for the first time in October 2022 by philologist Eduardo de Almeida Navarro, who also transcribed and commented on it.

A seventh letter was later found in the National Archive, in the city of Rio de Janeiro.

== Context ==
Section of the northeastern coast dominated by the Dutch between 1630 and 1654

In 1624, through the West India Company, the Dutch organized an invasion of the Brazilian Northeast, which was unsuccessful. They returned to Europe together with some natives, among whom were Antônio Paraupaba and Pedro Poti, (Note: Also included are Gaspar Paraupaba (father of Antônio Paraupaba), André Francisco, Antônio Guiravassauai, Antônio Francisco, and Luís Gaspar.) who later converted to Calvinism in Europe, where they lived for five years. Both were educated in Dutch.

Five years later, in 1630, the Dutch again invaded Pernambuco in order to establish a colony in Brazil. Coming with more than seven thousand men and a squadron of 67 ships, they succeeded, and by 1640 they already dominated a considerable portion of the northeastern coast. — Maranhão, Paraíba, Pernambuco, Rio Grande do Norte and Sergipe. However, in 1644 the Dutch governor Jean Maurice (Johan Maurits) of Nassau returned to the Netherlands. He had managed to balance the complicated relations between the West India Company and the indebted sugar plantation owners, and to enforce religious freedom.

Thus, as a result of the constant collection of debts, the sugarcane farmers began to aim to expel the Dutch. Also after the departure of Maurice of Nassau, religious conflicts ensued: In July 1645, Catholic faithful were massacred by the Dutch in Cunhaú, in the town of Canguaretama, and, in October, another slaughter was recorded, this time in Uruaçu. That same year, the Pernambuco Insurrection began, a movement opposed to Dutch rule and commanded by André Vidal de Negreiros, Henrique Dias, and Antônio Filipe Camarão.

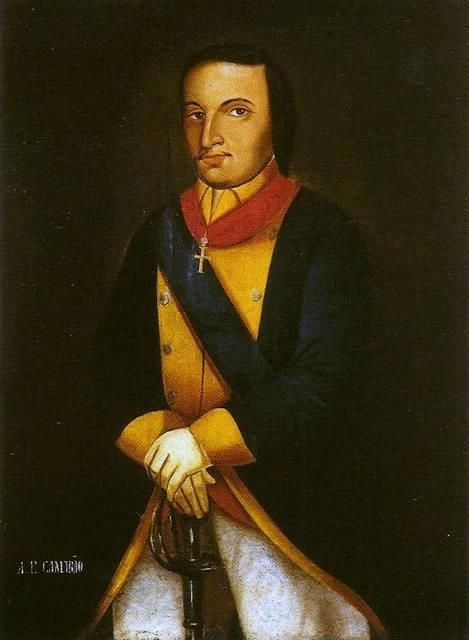
Antônio Filipe Camarão, considered one of the heroes of the Battle of Guararapes

A Tupi-speaking Potiguara, Filipe Camarão was responsible for leading the Christian Indians (like his uncle Jaguarari Simão Soares (Note: The versions "Jaguarary", "Jaguari" and "Jaguary" are also found. Among the Portuguese, he was known only as "Simão Soares".) and his cousin Diogo Pinheiro Camarão) against the Dutch. However, some Indians supported the Dutch side, among them the caciques Pedro Poti, also a cousin of Filipe Camarão, and Antônio Paraupaba.

It is in this context that letters were exchanged among the Potiguara. Those who were on the side of the Portuguese sent letters to the allies of the Dutch in an attempt to persuade them to switch to the Lusitanian side. The messages were written in Old Tupi because their recipients, Pedro Poti and Antônio Paraupaba, (Note: The versions "Paraopaba" and "Paraopeba" are also found.) had been literate in Dutch, unlike their senders who were literate in Portuguese. The Old Tupi language was therefore a means of communication between the two sides of the conflict.

== Translation ==
=== History ===
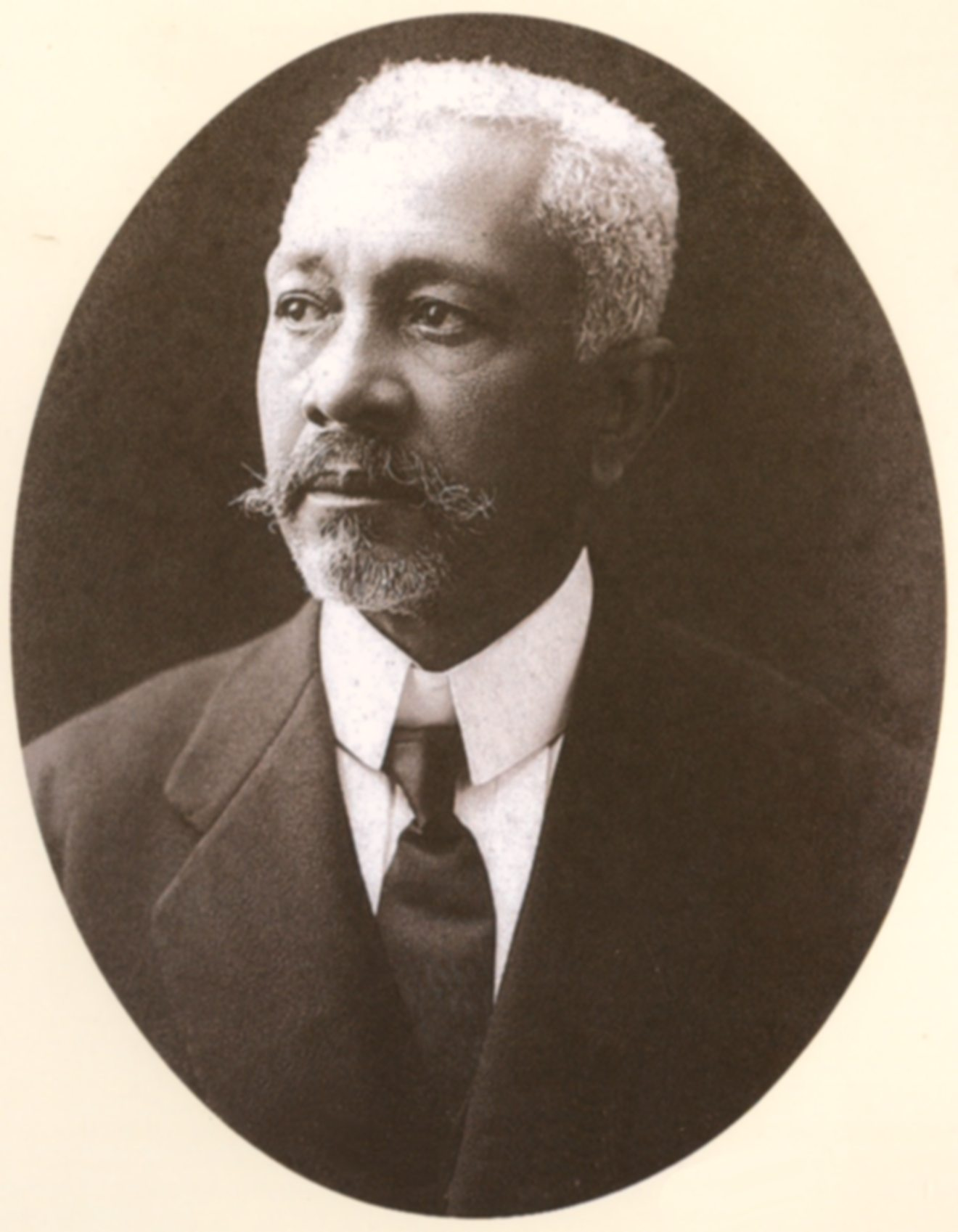
Teodoro Fernandes Sampaio, the first Tupinologist to attempt to translate the letters of the Camarão Indians

In 1906, the engineer Teodoro Fernandes Sampaio attempted to translate the letters in his article Cartas tupis dos Camarões (Camarão Indians' Tupi letters). He received them from historian José Higino Duarte Pereira, who had discovered them in 1885. Sampaio confessed that only with great difficulty could he understand them, and he could not translate them in their entirety. He therefore limited himself to only two letters.

I confess that it was only with great difficulty that I could understand the Tupi in which the first two letters were written, the only ones in which I managed to do something in the restoration and translation of the text. The rest are still indecipherable to me; they are real enigmas. (Note: Original: "Confesso que só com grande difficuldade consegui entender o tupi em que foram escriptas as duas primeiras cartas, as unicas em que logrei fazer alguma cousa na restauração e traducção do texto. As restantes estão ainda para mim indecifraveis; são verdadeiros enigmas.")

— Teodoro Sampaio

There were no further attempts to translate the letters until the 1990s, when linguist Aryon Rodrigues, a professor at Unicamp, went to the Netherlands to look for them. However, he could not translate them either. Meanwhile, the philologist Eduardo de Almeida Navarro had his first contact with the letters and related their indecipherability to the nonexistence of Tupi dictionaries. In 2013, Eduardo Navarro published the "Dicionário de tupi antigo: a língua indígena clássica do Brasil" (Dictionary of Old Tupi: the Classical Indigenous Language of Brazil) and began to devote himself, albeit intermittently, to the letters, provided on microfilm by the Hague Library.

In 2021, after eight years, Eduardo Navarro announced that he had finally translated the six letters, a fact that was widely covered by the Brazilian press. The transcription and annotated full translation of the Camarão Indians' letters were published in the periodical Boletim do Museu Paraense Emílio Goeldi in October 2022.

=== Challenges ===
According to Eduardo Navarro, the letters' contents were mysterious because knowledge about the Tupi language was long precarious. Few systematic studies about the language, such as dictionaries, had been created.

Agreeing with Teodoro Sampaio, he goes further and also cites the letters' unstable spelling, since Tupi was mostly used orally, not in written form. Thus, words that should be written together were written separately, and vice versa, and the same words were often spelled differently. The mannerisms of the time, such as abbreviations and punctuation, also offer difficulties. Furthermore, the authors of the letters - Diogo da Costa, Diogo Pinheiro Camarão, Filipe Camarão and Simão Soares - were probably literate in Portuguese, not Tupi, and, because of this, when writing, they registered their native language "by ear" (like a Lusophone writing "taquesse" instead of "táxi", for example), failing to register some phonemes and making little use of punctuation marks and accentuation. The letters also present a Tupi that was spoken in a colloquial way, which diverges from the formal writings of the Jesuits.

== Content ==
=== Letters ===
In 1630, Henry Cornelius Lonck conquered Pernambuco in a war that divided the Potiguaras

Roughly speaking, the pro-Portuguese natives asked those who were allied with the Dutch to return to the Lusitanian side, calling the Protestants heretics. This is the argument used by Filipe Camarão in his first letter to Pedro Poti, dated August 19, 1645. He also states that the Dutch are in "the Devil's fire".

Pedro Poti ordered that the messenger of such a letter be killed, and its answer is known only through Dutch summaries by Pastor Johannes Edwards, because the Portuguese did not preserve the letters of the indigenous people. The cacique Pedro Poti is said to have criticized the Portuguese forcefully, saying that he could not switch to the Portuguese side, because they had only harmed his people by enslaving and killing them.

No, Philippe, you allow yourselves to be deceived; it is evident that the plan of the Portuguese thugs is none other than to take over this country, and then murder or enslave both you and all of us. (Note: Original: "Não, Philippe, vós vos deixais illudir; é evidente que o plano dos scelerados Portuguesez não é outro sinão o de se apossarem deste paiz, e então assassinarem ou escravizarem tanto a vós como a nós todos.")

— Pedro Poti

In general, the letters reveal dissatisfaction over the Indians' contemporary situation, since they wished their relatives to unite, to stop fighting each other, and to go back to living according to their old traditions. They are desperate efforts in an attempt to save their people from destruction. The disruption of their traditional world is noticeable in all six missives.

In his letters, Filipe Camarão tried to appeal to the sense of identity among the Potiguaras. Furthermore, he assured Pedro Poti and Antônio Paraupaba that the natives would be forgiven if they went over to the Portuguese side, but said that if they resisted, they would be killed, since the honors bestowed by the Dutch on the natives were not valid for the Portuguese (Note: Pedro Poti, when captured by the Portuguese, was tortured and, as predicted by Filipe Camarão, died. The exact location of his death is uncertain, so some say he died in a Portuguese prison, and others say he died in a ship bound for Portugal, where he would be judged.) — when Europeans were captured, they were not killed, but turned into prisoners and used as bargaining chips.

=== Text excerpt ===
The following excerpt was taken from Diogo Pinheiro Camarão's letter of October 21 to Pedro Poti. The modernization of its spelling and the translation of its content was done by Eduardo Navarro in the 1998 first edition of his book Método moderno de tupi antigo: a língua do Brasil dos primeiros séculos, i.e. Modern Method of Old Tupi: The Language of Brazil from the First Centuries.

Standardized Spelling	Literal Portuguese language translation	Portuguese–English language translation
Ikó xe papera endé sepîaky îanondé,	Antes de veres esta minha carta,	Before you see this letter of mine,
xe rorykatu ã,	eis que eu estou muito feliz,	and here I am very happy,
opabenhẽ pe marane'yma resé gûiporandupa,	perguntando pela saúde de todos vós,	asking for the health of all of you,
xe abé ã na xe marani nhẽ gûitekóbo.	eu também não estando mal.	me not being bad either.
(…)
Eîor esema Anhanga ratá nungara suí.	Vem para sair do que é parecido ao fogo do Diabo.	Come to escape from what is akin to the Devil's fire.
Eîkuab cristãoramo nde rekó!	Saibas que és cristão!	Know that you are a Christian!
(…)
Karaíba na okanhemba'e ruã.	O cristão não é o que se perde.	The Christian is not the one who is lost.

=== Chronology ===
The following table seeks to synthesize the information about the letters of the Camarão Indians. It includes their dates, senders, allegiance, and published translations.

The six Camarão Indians' letters
Date(s)	(Portugal) Sender(s)	(Netherlands) Recipient(s)	Published translation(s)
19 August 1645^{[see]} August 1645 (postscript)	Antônio Filipe Camarão; Jaguarari Simão Soares (postscript)	Pedro Poti	Navarro (2022)
4 October 1645^{[see]}	Antônio Filipe Camarão	Pedro Poti	Navarro (2022)
4 October 1645^{[see]}	Antônio Filipe Camarão	Antônio Paraupaba	Navarro (2022)
17 October 1645^{[see]}	Diogo da Costa	Pedro Poti	Sampaio (1906); Cerno and Obermeier (2013); Navarro (2022)
21 October 1645^{[see]}	Diogo Pinheiro Camarão	Pedro Poti	Sampaio (1906); Navarro (1998); Cerno and Obermeier (2013); Navarro (2022)
21 October 1645^{[see]}	Diogo Pinheiro Camarão	Capitães Baltazar Araberana, Gaspar Cararu, Jandaia and Pedro Valadina	Navarro (2022)

== Legacy ==
=== Importance ===
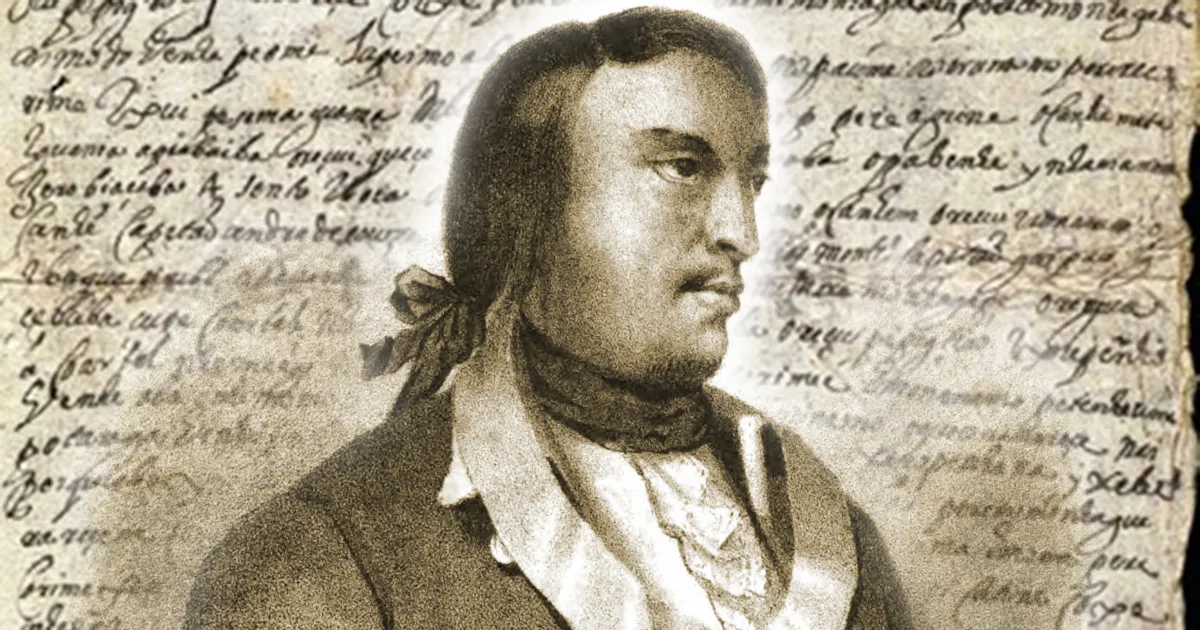
Influenced by the Portuguese, the Tupi of the 17th century already differed from that of pre-Cabraline Brazil. The image depicts Antônio Filipe Camarão, and his first letter is in the background.

The letters reveal history from the perspective of those who have always been oppressed, that is, the indigenous people, showing their dissatisfaction on the occasion of conflicts between Europeans and the will to rescue past traditions. The missives also bring to light previously unknown information, such as place names and other indigenous combatants, as well as revealing details about battles.

As far as the scientific study of language is concerned, the letters of the Camarão Indians are considered the most valuable documents in the field of Brazilian indigenous linguistics, making it possible to observe how Old Tupi was actually spoken by the Indians who wrote the letters. They are also, in this sense, evidence that the Jesuit missionaries described the Tupi language correctly, since there are some scholars, such as Joaquim Mattoso Câmara Júnior, who claim that the Jesuits adapted the language to their own interests, pejoratively calling it "Jesuit Tupi".

Furthermore, the letters of the Camarão Indians also help to understand the linguistic evolution of Old Tupi, influenced by Portuguese. In fact, these writings display the use of the gerund in constructions analogous to the Portuguese "estou falando" (I'm speaking), when it was Tupi's nature to invert this logic and say "falo estando" ([I] speak being).

The letters also reveal the predominance of a subject-verb-object syntax (aîmondó ã xe "soldados" ebapó — "eis que enviei meus soldados para aí" [I have sent my soldiers there]), although there were still examples of subject-object-verb syntax (emokûeî bé mokõî kunhã aîmondó — "para aí também duas mulheres enviei" [there also two women I sent]), primitive Tupi tendency, as recorded in quinhentist texts.

=== Popular culture ===
In March 2022, Natal mayor Álvaro Costa Dias met with Eduardo Navarro and agreed that the city would distribute didactic material about the letters to public school students and tourists. The mayor showed his intention to democratize the access to information about the correspondence between the Potiguaras.

== Gallery ==
19 August 1645, from Antônio Filipe Camarão to Pedro Poti
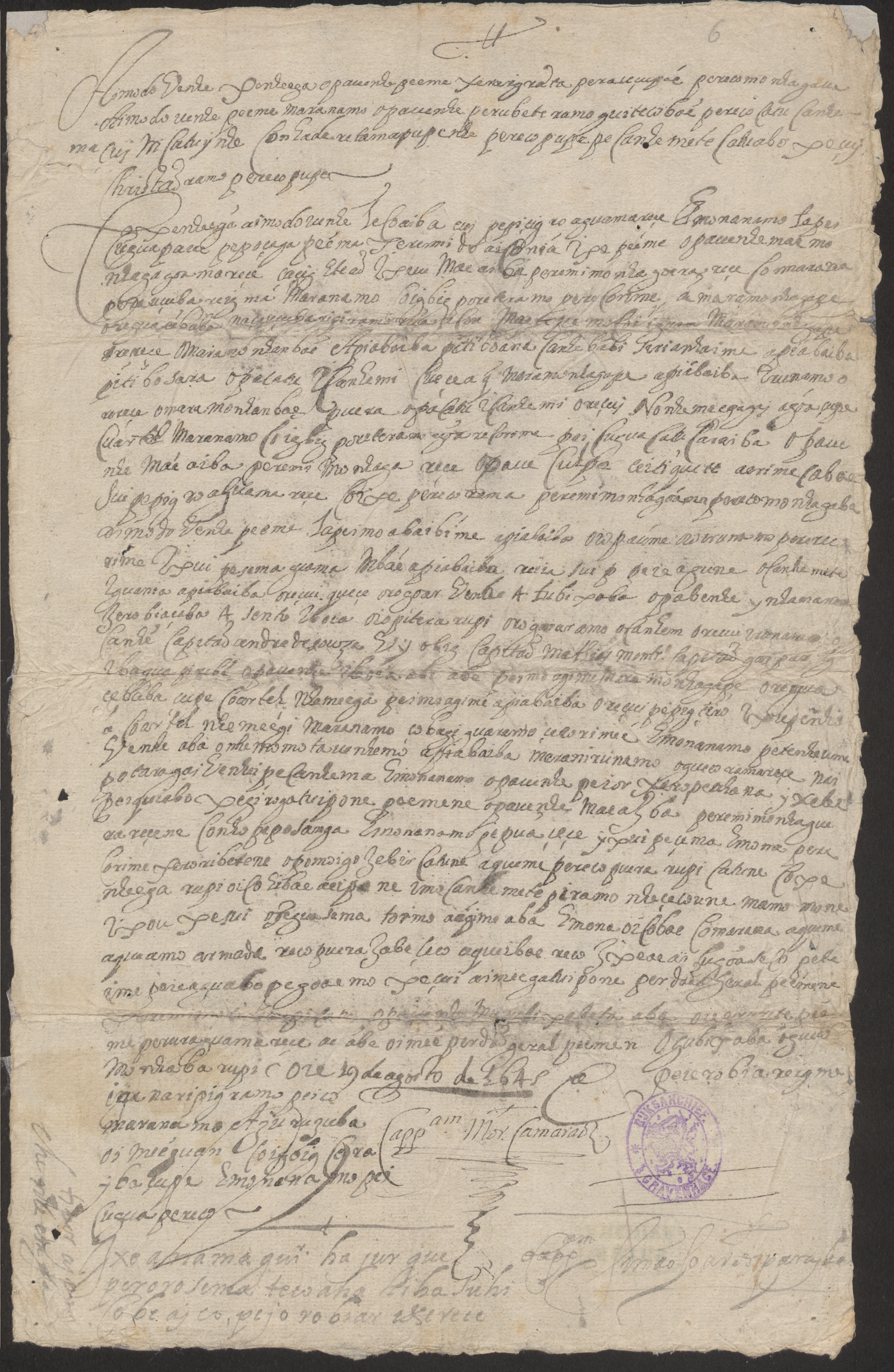
First and only part from the letter
4 October 1645, from Antônio Filipe Camarão to Pedro Poti
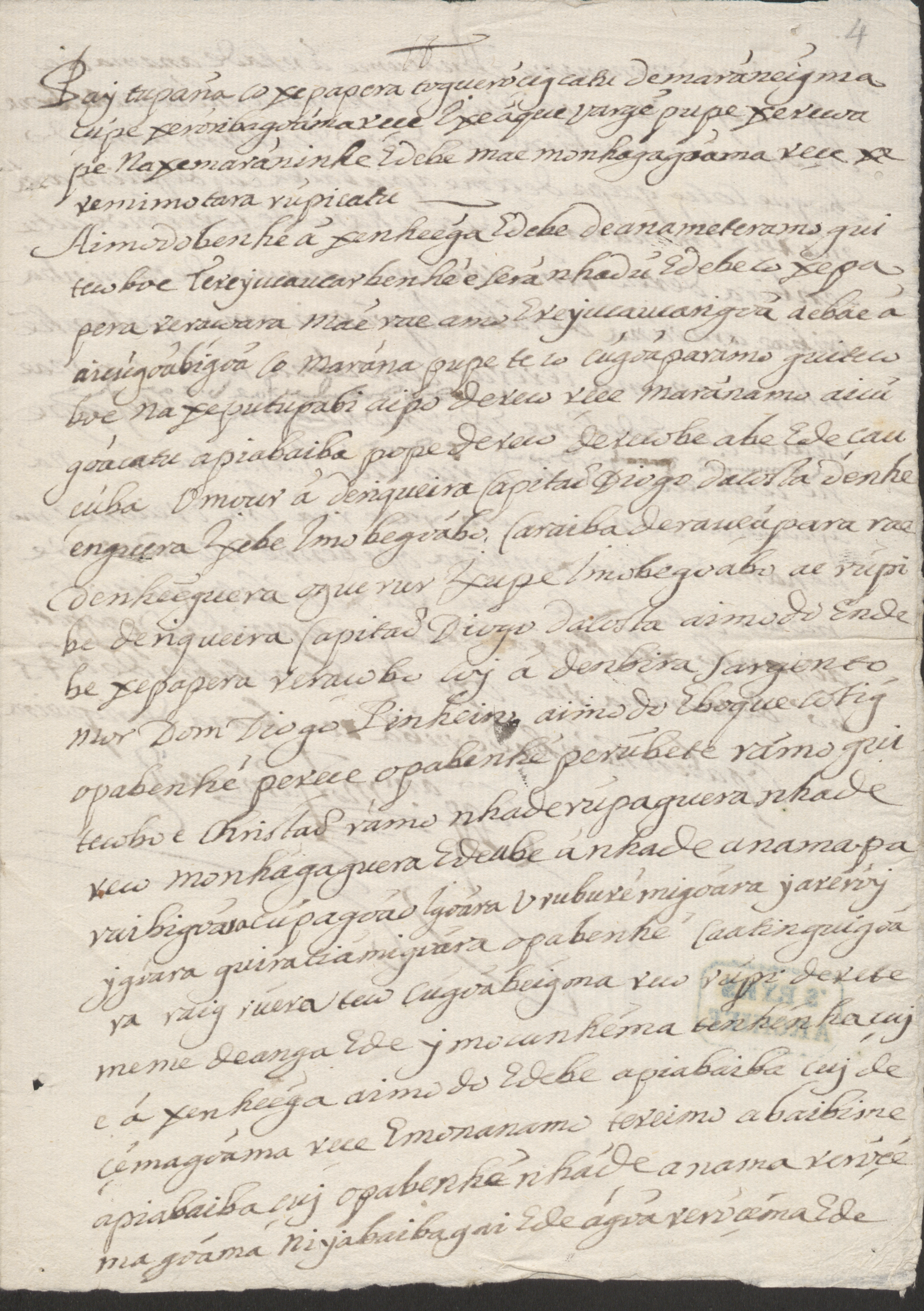
First part

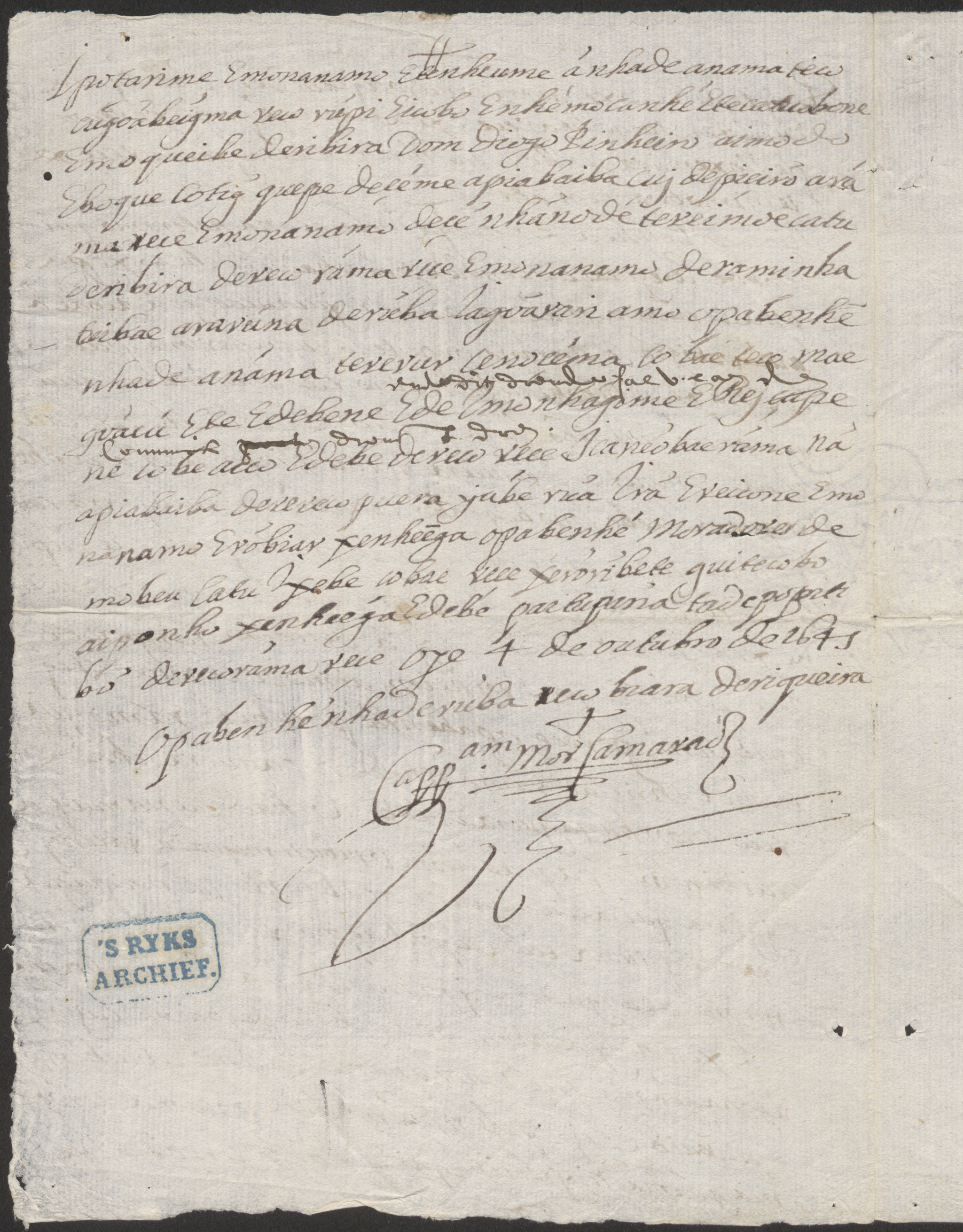
Second part

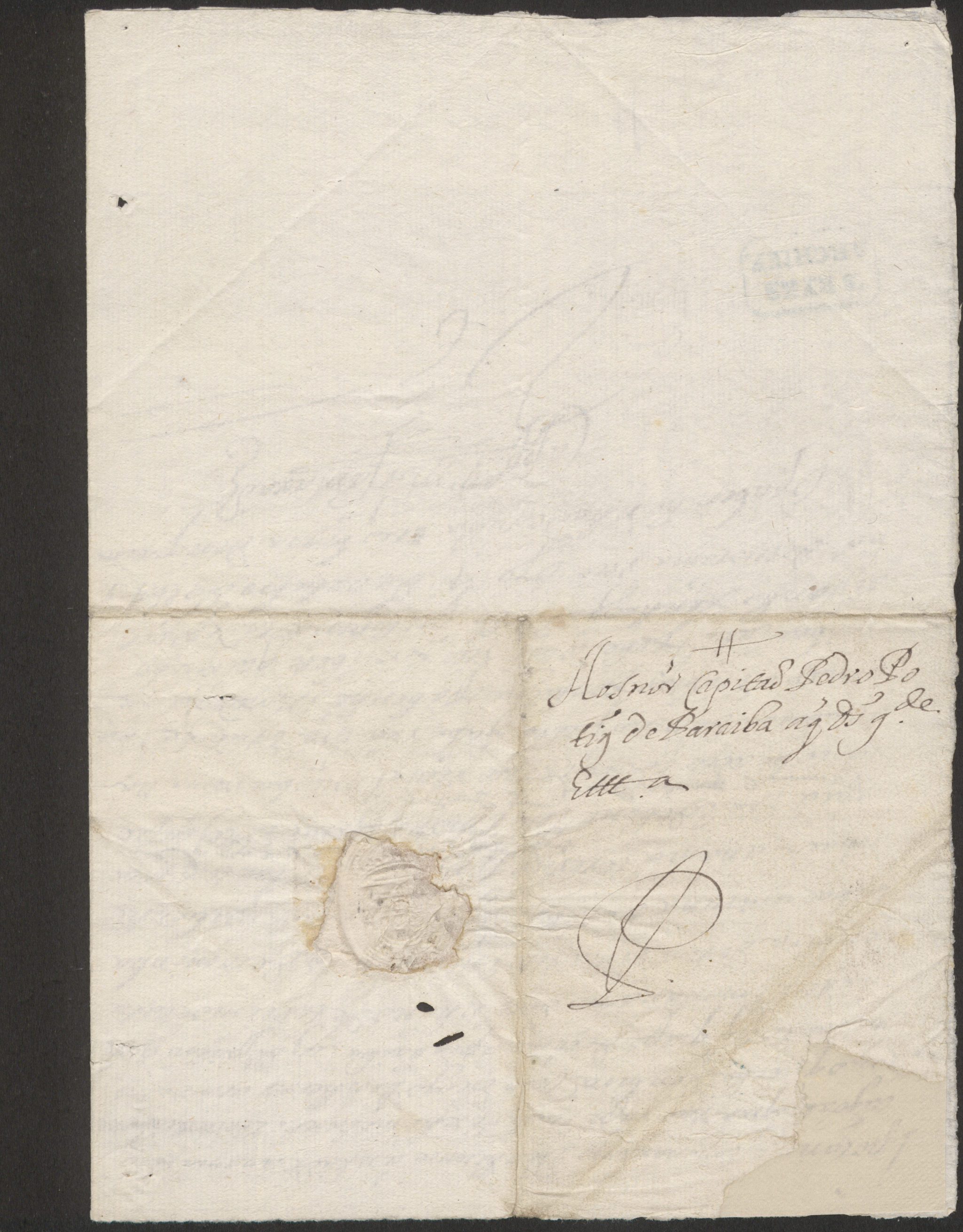
Third and last part
4 October 1645, from Antônio Filipe Camarão to Antônio Paraupaba
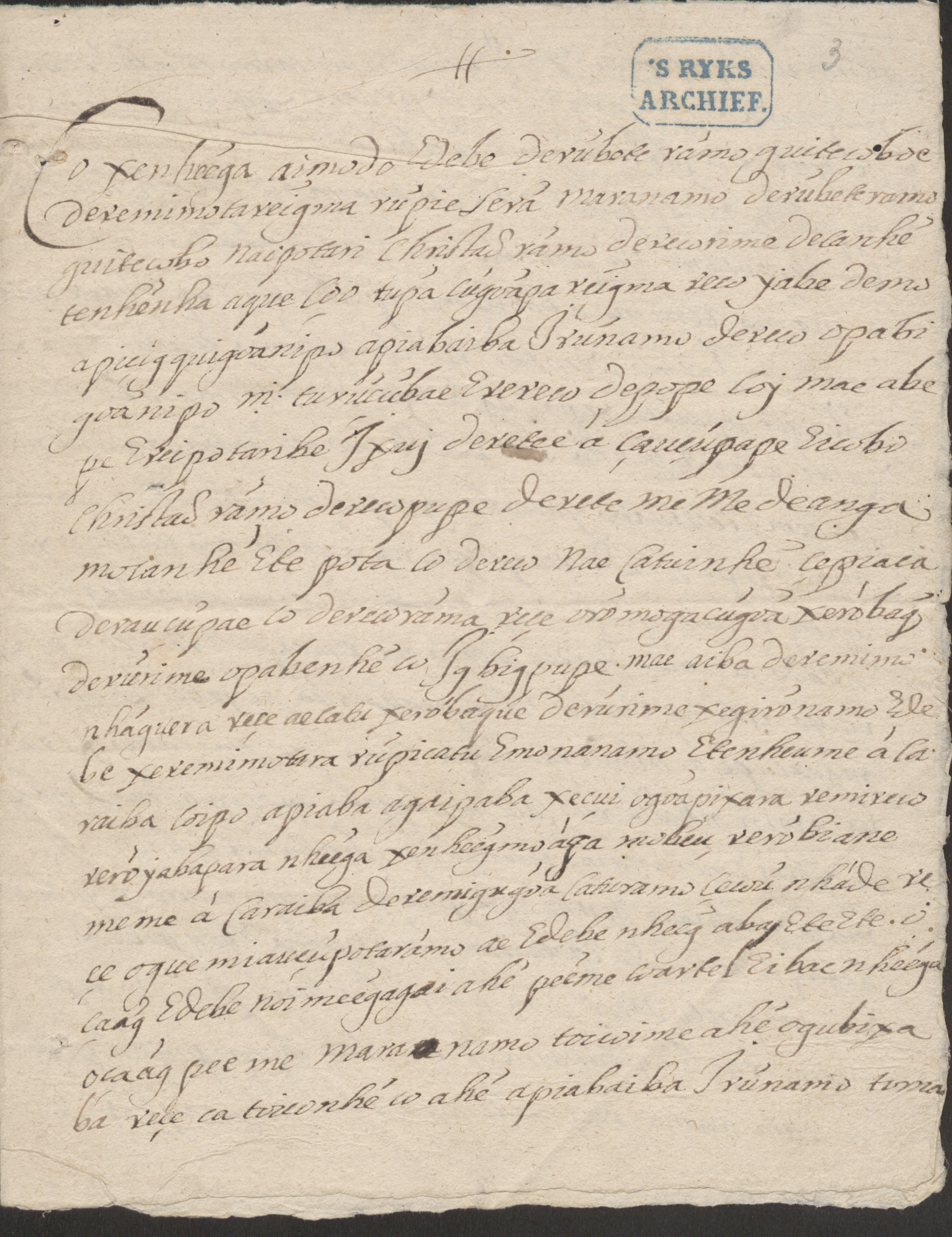
First part

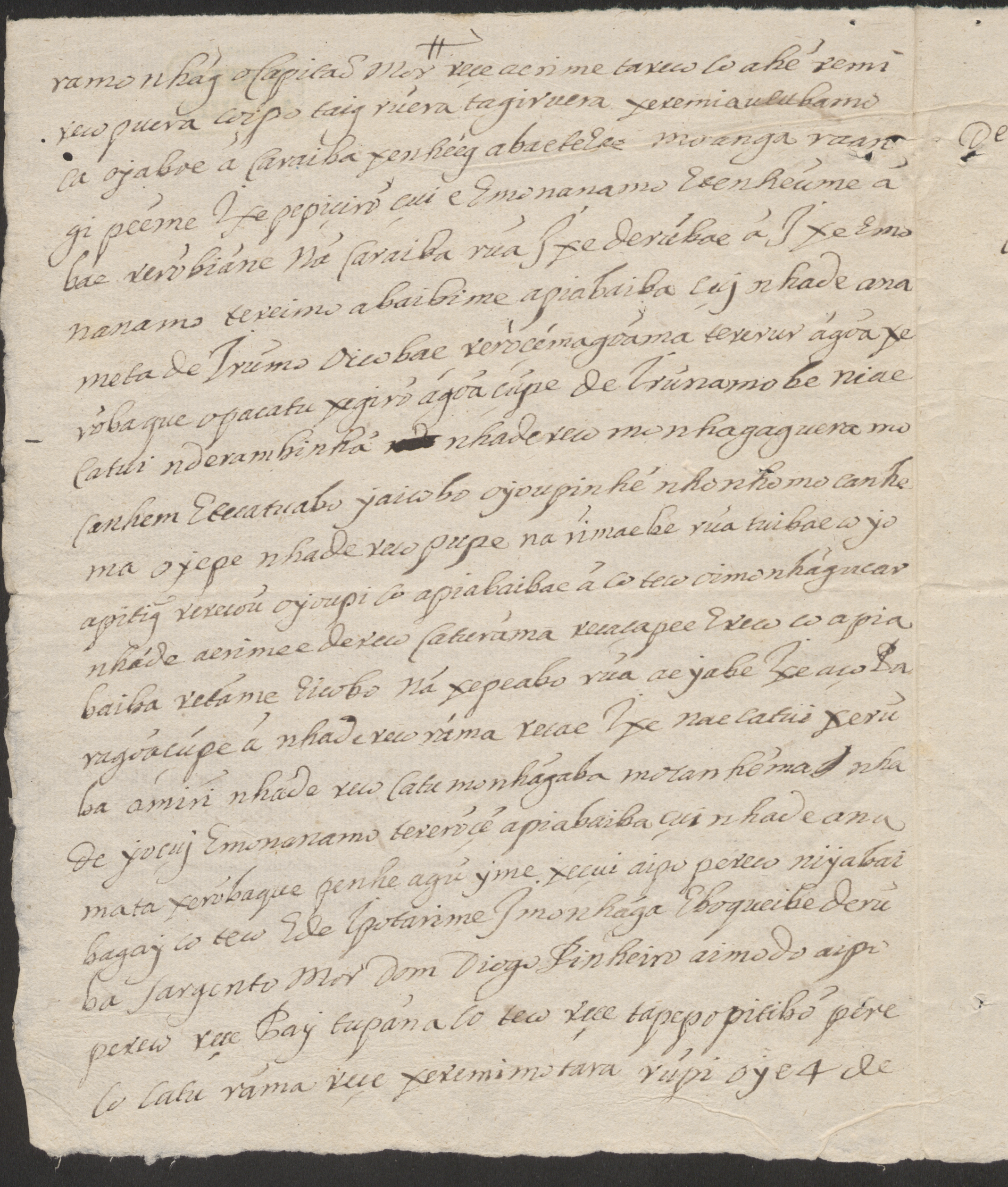
Second part

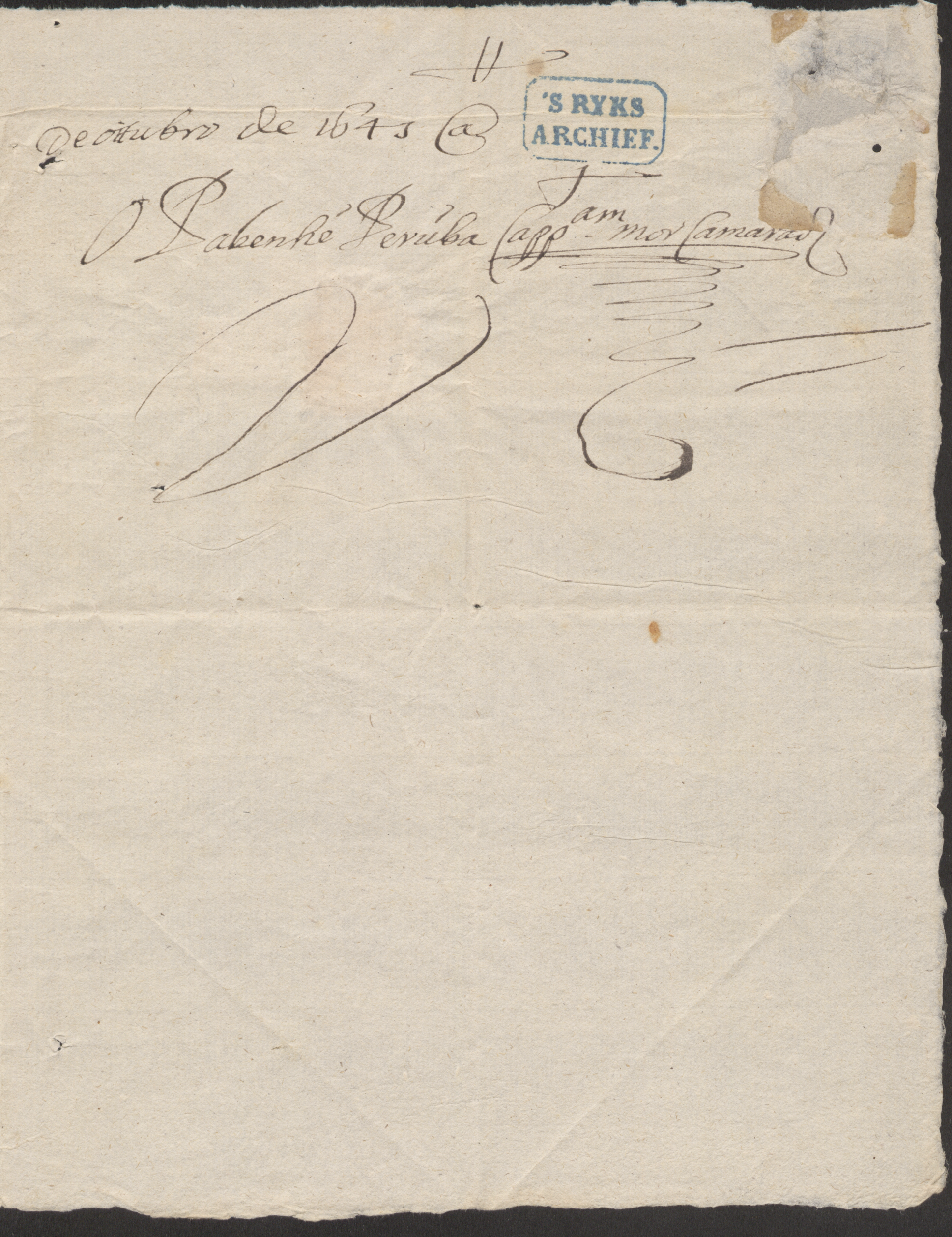
Third part

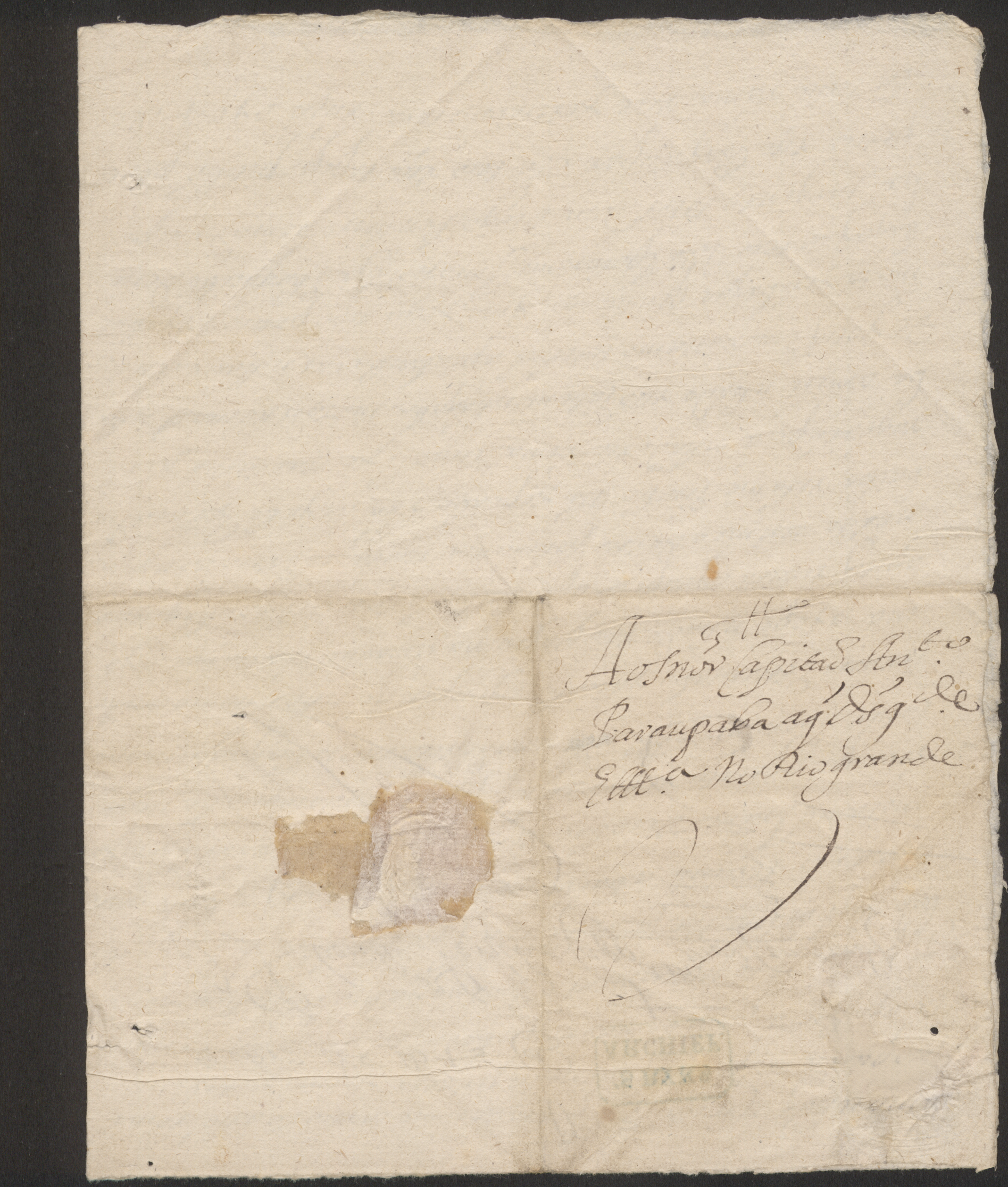
Fourth and last part
17 October 1645, from Diogo da Costa to Pedro Poti
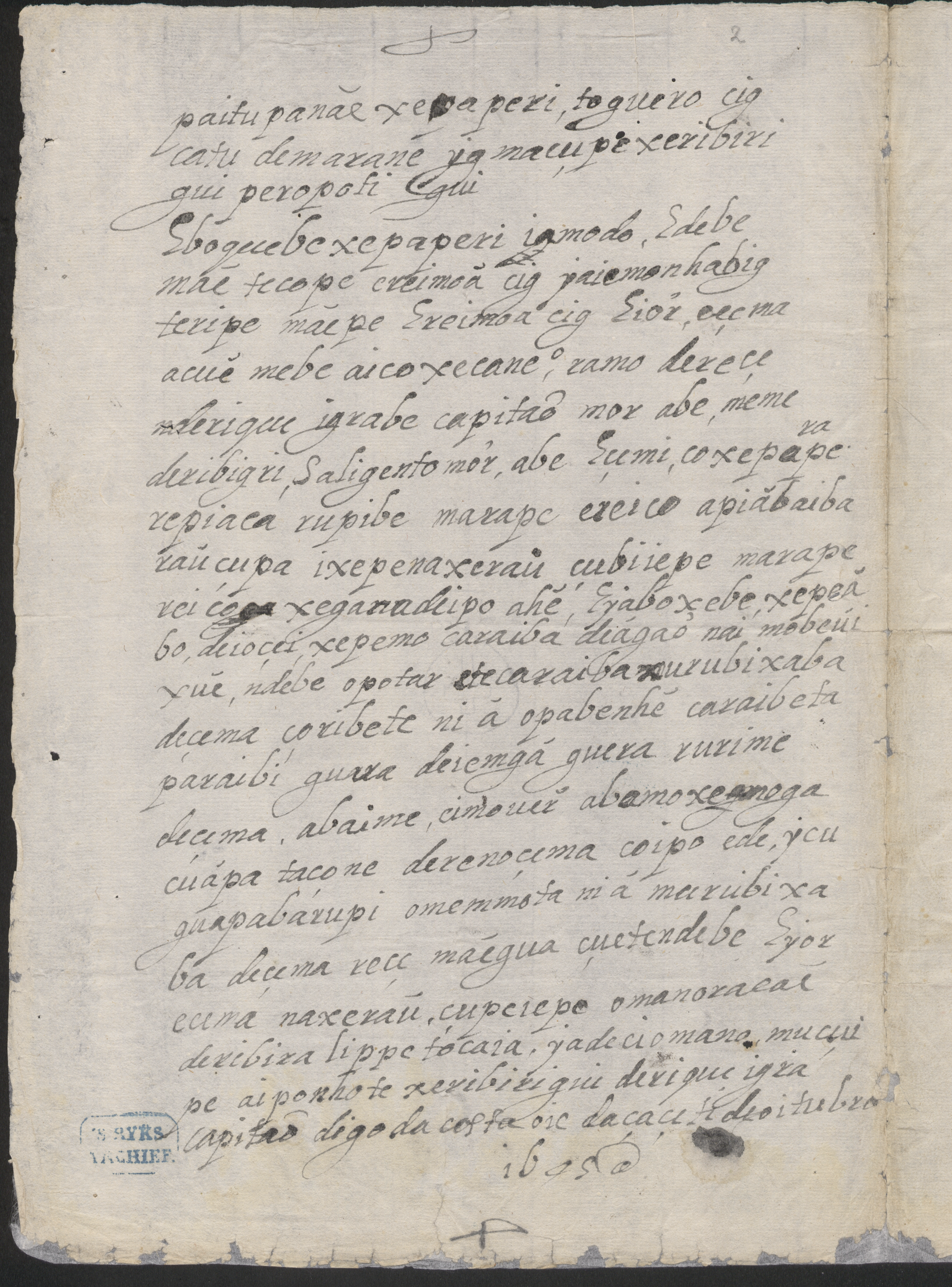
First part

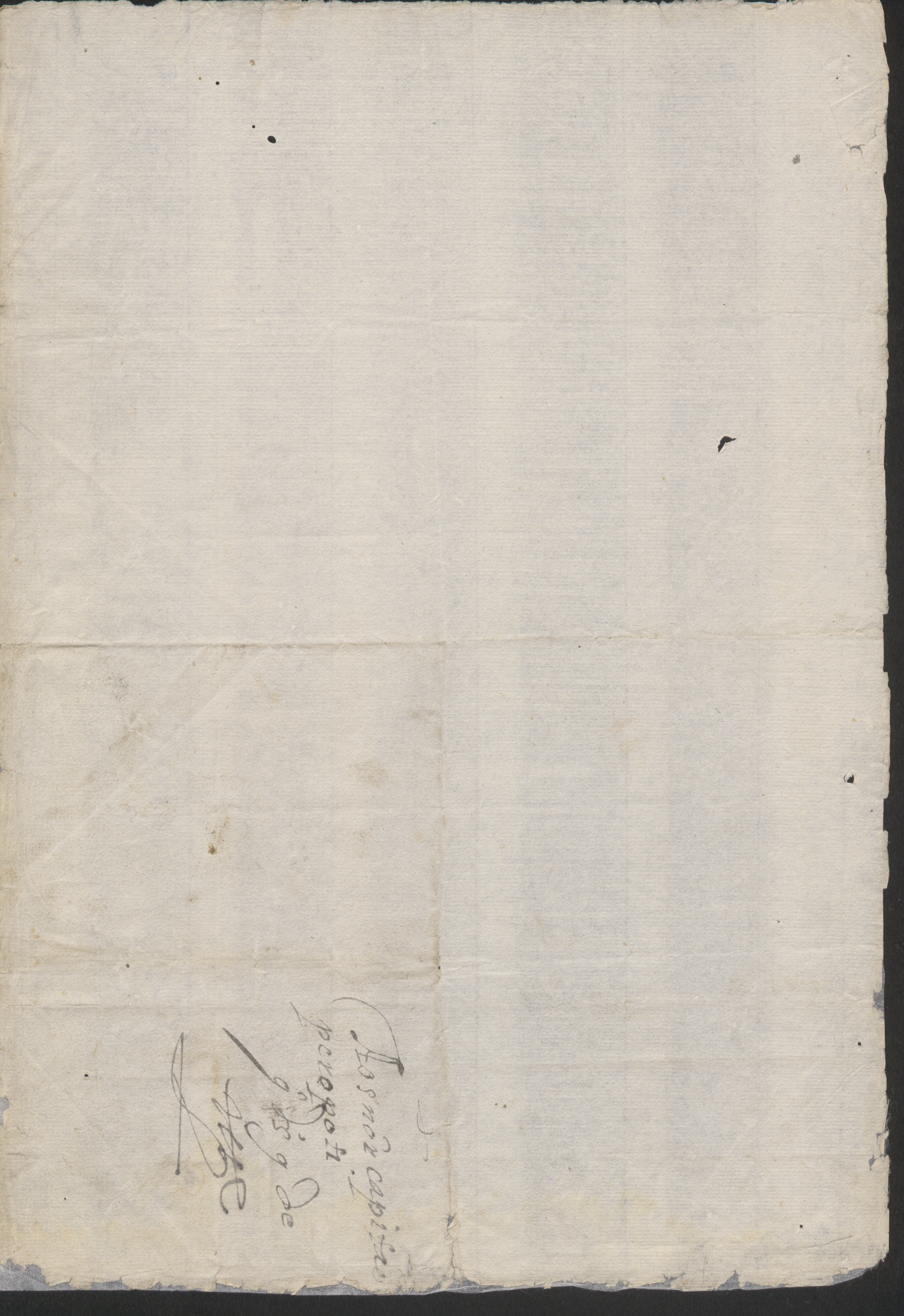
Second and last part
21 October 1645, from Diogo Pinheiro Camarão to Pedro Poti
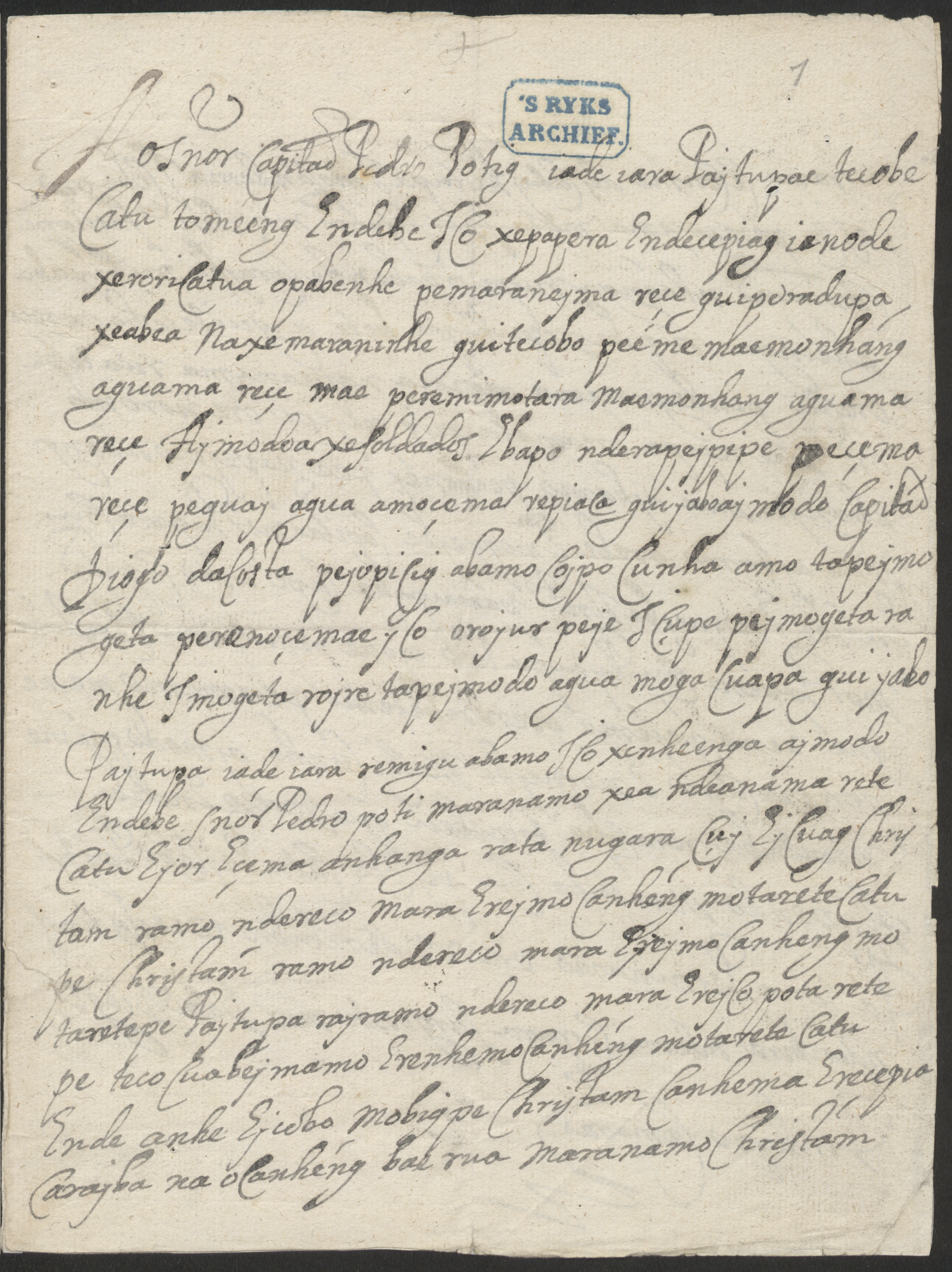
First part

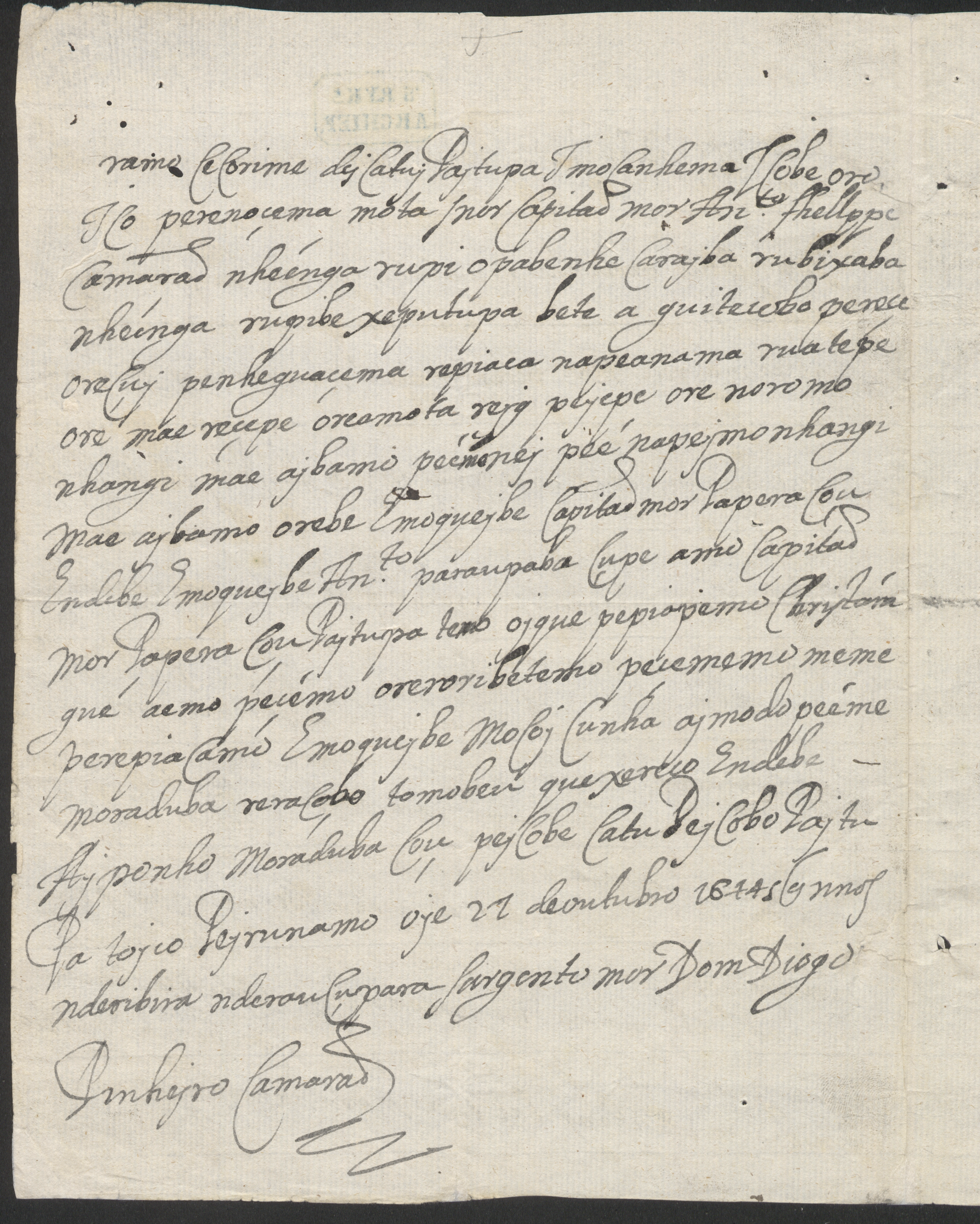
Second part

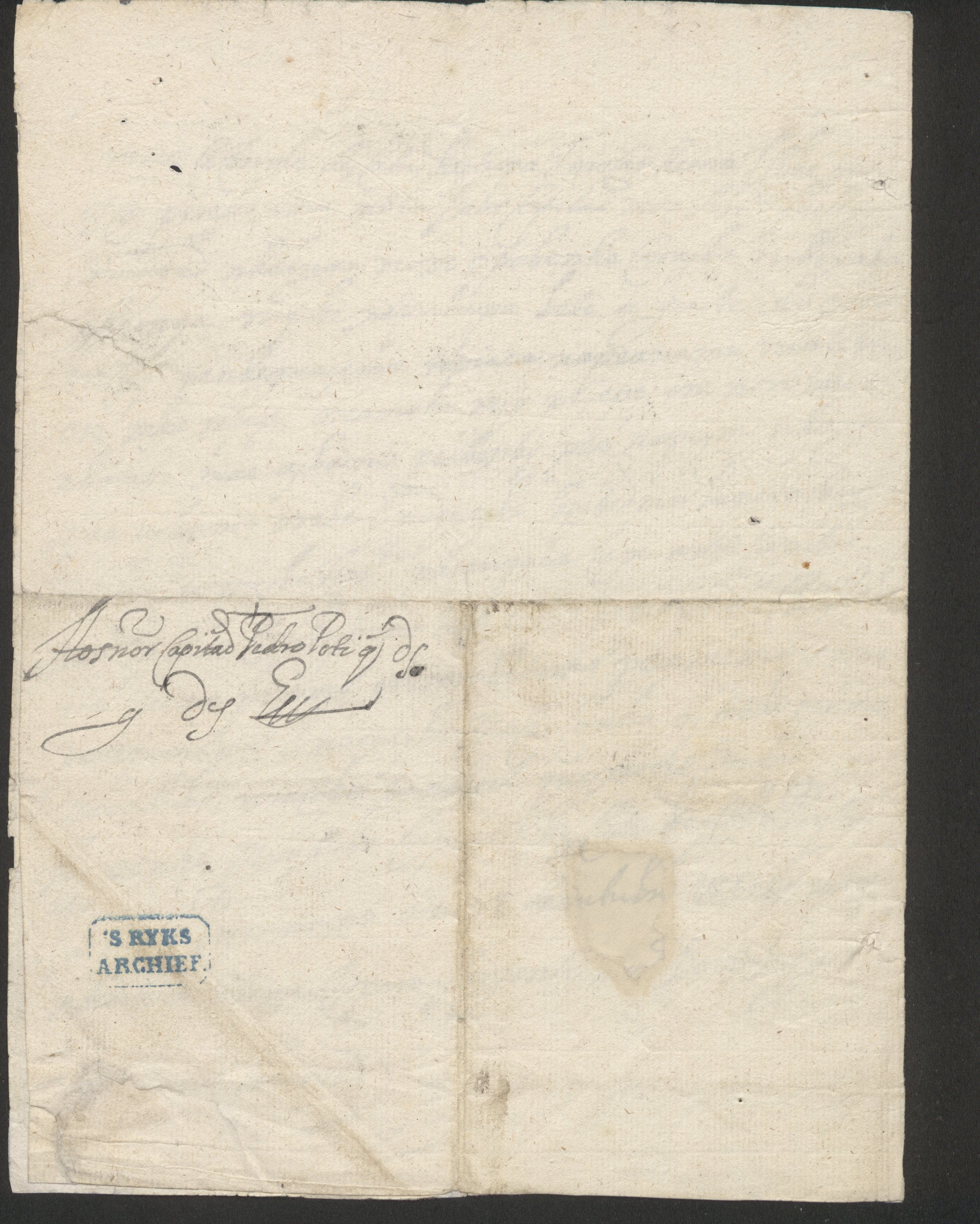
Third and last part
21 October 1645 from Diogo Pinheiro Camarão to four capitains
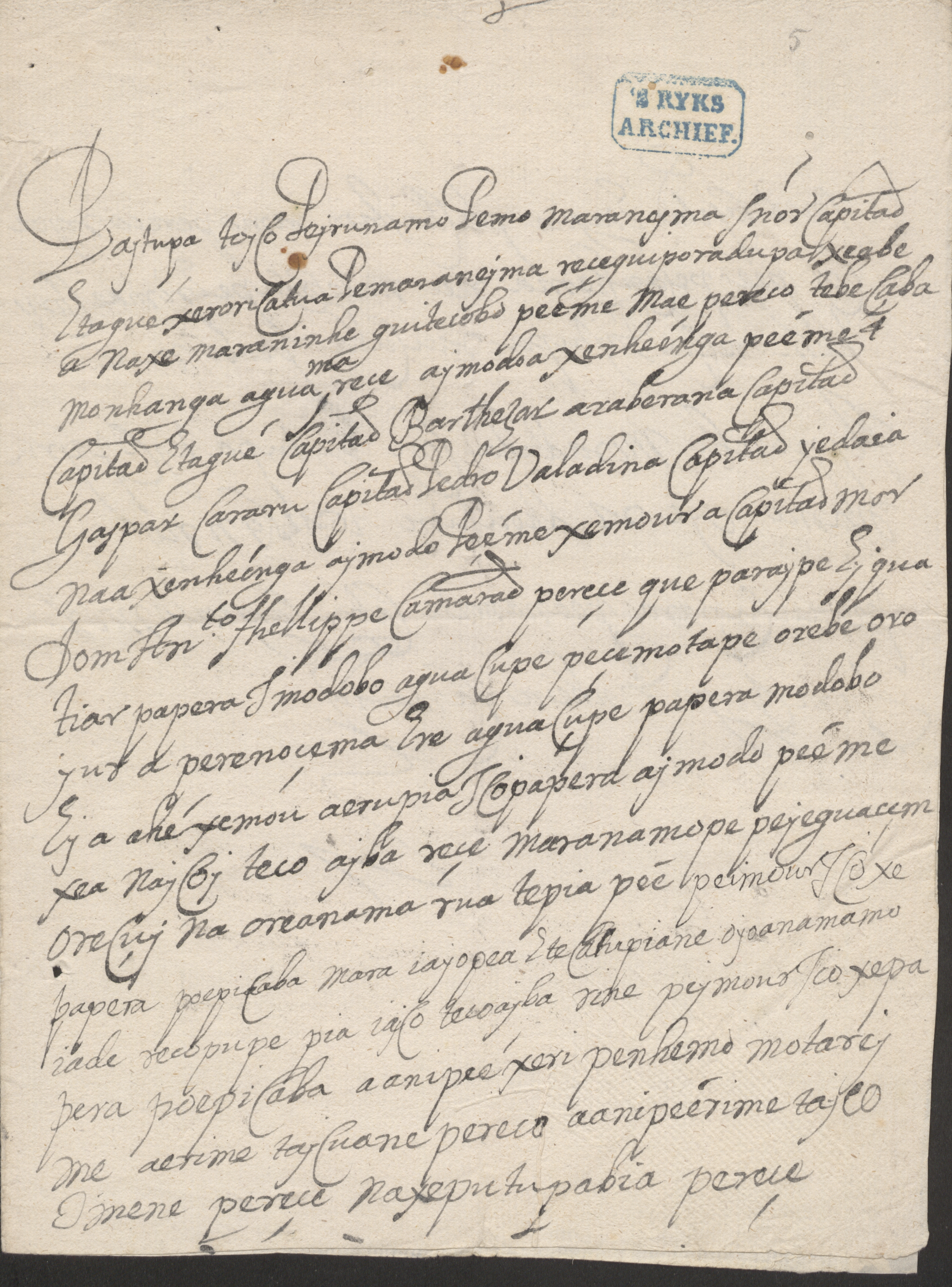
First part

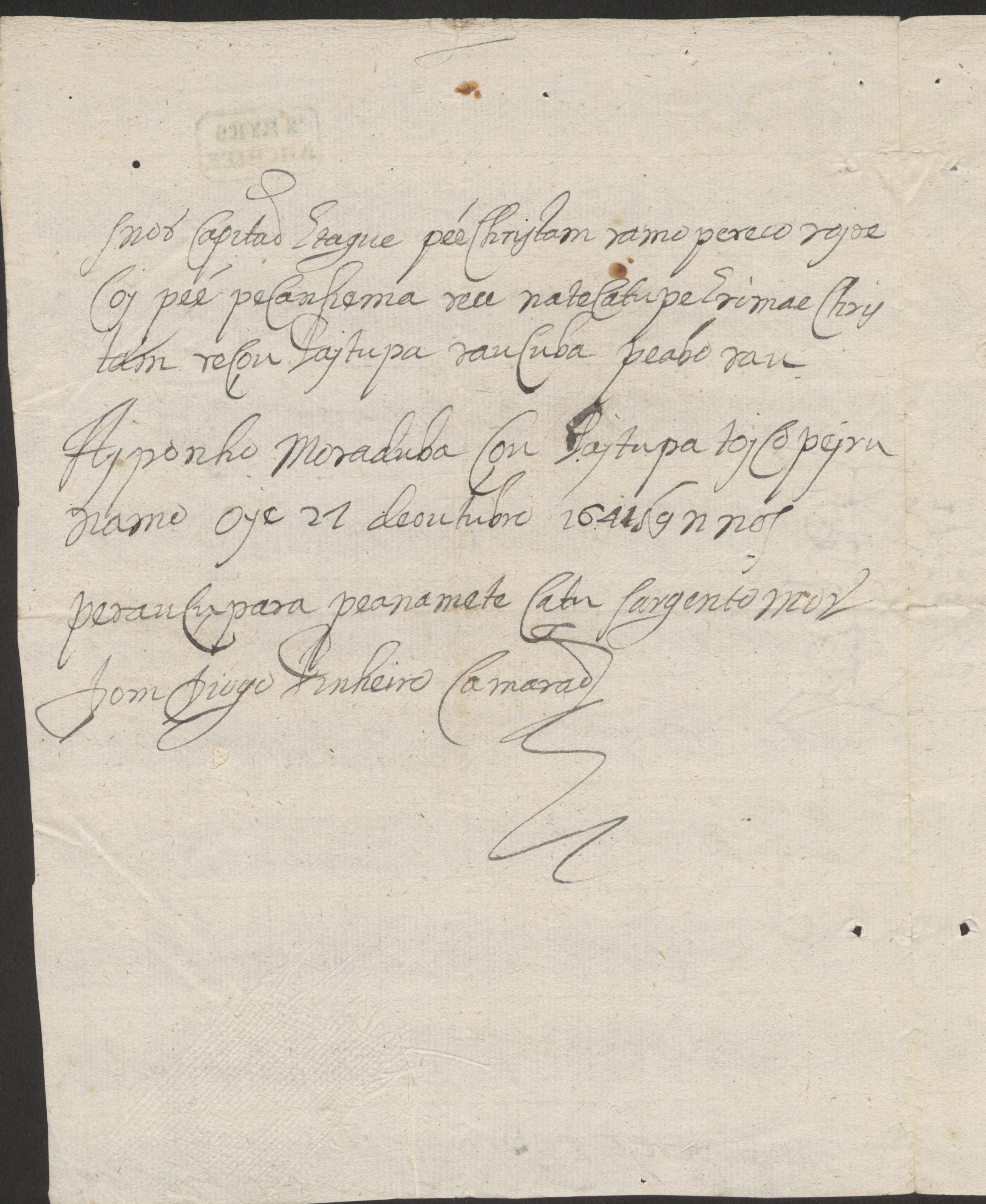
Second part

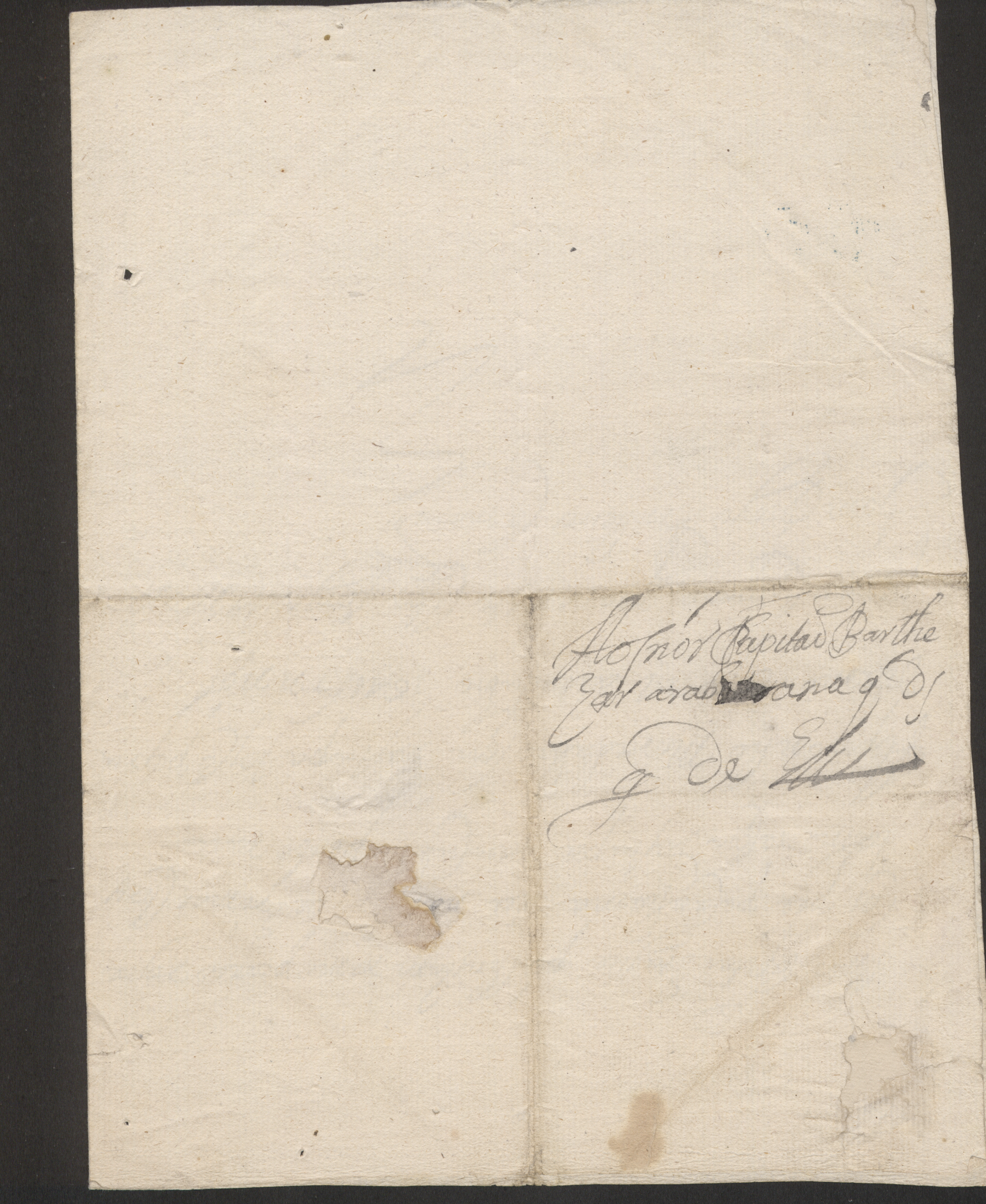
Third and last part

== See also ==
- Dutch Brazil
- Protestantism
- Martyrs of Natal

== Bibliography ==
- Barbosa, Antônio Lemos (1956). Curso de tupi antigo: gramática, exercícios e textos (in Brazilian Portuguese) (1.ª ed.). Rio de Janeiro: Livraria São José. p. 484. Archived from the original on 2022-08-19.
- Barbosa, Bartira Ferraz; Barros, Cândida; Monserrat, Ruth (2020). "Um escrito tupi do capitão Simão Soares Parayba (1645)". Corpus (in Brazilian Portuguese). 10 (2): 15. doi:10.4000/corpusarchivos.4218. S2CID 234549637. Archived from the original on 2021-05-06.
- BARROS, Cândida; MONSERRAT, Ruth (2021). "Cartas de oferta de "quartel" em tupi de lideranças Potiguaras (1645)". Cadernos de Linguística (in Brazilian Portuguese). 2 (4): 12. doi:10.25189/2675-4916.2021.v2.n4.id447. S2CID 240504495. Archived from the original on 2022-10-08.
- COSTA, Regina de Carvalho Ribeiro da (2021). "A prática discursiva potiguara em meio às guerras luso-holandesas: a participação política dos brasilianos". Acervo (in Brazilian Portuguese): 23. Archived from the original on 2022-07-06.
- LODEWIJK, Hulsman (2006). "Índios do Brasil na República dos Países Baixos: as representações de Antônio Paraupaba para os Estados Gerais em 1654 e 1656". Revista de História (in Brazilian Portuguese) (154): 37–69. doi:10.11606/issn.2316-9141.v0i154p37-69. Archived from the original on 2021-10-29.
- NAVARRO, Eduardo de Almeida (2005). Método moderno de tupi antigo: a língua do Brasil dos primeiros séculos (in Brazilian Portuguese) (3.ª ed.). São Paulo: Global Editora. p. 464. ISBN 978-85-260-1058-1.
- NAVARRO, Eduardo de Almeida (2013). Dicionário de tupi antigo: a língua indígena clássica do Brasil (in Brazilian Portuguese) (1.ª ed.). São Paulo: Global Editora. p. 624. ISBN 978-85-260-1933-1.
- NAVARRO, Eduardo de Almeida (2021). "Os topônimos com a posposição tupi -pe no território brasileiro". Boletim do Museu Paraense Emílio Goeldi (in Brazilian Portuguese). 16 (2): 15. doi:10.1590/2178-2547-BGOELDI-2020-0041. S2CID 237873431.
- NAVARRO, Eduardo de Almeida (2022). "Transcrição e tradução integral anotada das cartas dos índios Camarões, escritas em 1645 em tupi antigo" (PDF). Boletim do Museu Paraense Emílio Goeldi (in Brazilian Portuguese). 17 (3). Belem: 49. doi:10.1590/2178-2547-bgoeldi-2021-0034. ISSN 2178-2547. S2CID 253359706. Archived (PDF) from the original on 2022-10-07.
- OBERMEIER, Franz (2016). "Indigenous letters in colonial Brazil: a Tupi-correspondence during the Dutch Wars in 1645/1646". ZiF-Konferenz: 27. Archived from the original on 2022-09-05.
- SAMPAIO, Teodoro Fernandes (1906). "Cartas tupis dos Camarões". Revista do Instituto Archeologico e Geographico Pernambucano (in Brazilian Portuguese): 281–305. Archived from the original on 2022-08-27.
