= Genocide of Indigenous peoples in Paraguay =

There are 17 indigenous tribes in Paraguay with the majority having their territories in the Chaco region. Tribes in this region include the Guaraní, Ayoreo, Toba-Maskoy, Aché and Sanapan which according to the census from 2002 number an estimated 86,000 or roughly around 2 per cent of the total population. These peoples have faced persecution particularly under the dictator Alfredo Stroessner that some observers called a genocide.

== Repression under Alfredo Stroessner ==
Between 1956 and 1989, while under the military rule of General Alfredo Stroessner, the indigenous population had more territory taken than at any other period in Paraguay's history and were subjected to systematic human rights abuses. In 1971, Mark Münzel, a German anthropologist accused Stroessner of attempted genocide against the indigenous peoples of Paraguay and Bartomeu Melià, a Jesuit anthropologist stated that the forced relocations of the indigenous peoples was ethnocide. In the early 1970s the Stroessner regime was charged by international groups of being complicit in genocide. However, because of the repressive actions undertaken by the state the indigenous tribes organized themselves politically and had a major role in bringing about the end of the military dictatorship and the eventual transition to democracy. The state financed these repressive actions with U.S. aid, which totaled $146 million from 1962 to 1975 to Paraguay.

== Destruction of the Aché tribe ==
Reports of massacres of the Aché extend to as early as 1903. During the 1960s and 1970s, under the dictatorship of Stroessner, 85 percent of the Aché tribe died, with many hacked to death with machetes to make room for the timber industry, mining, farming, and ranchers. One estimate posits this amounts to 900 deaths. According to Jérémie Gilbert, the situation in Paraguay has proven that it is difficult to provide the proof required to show "specific intent", in support of a claim that genocide had occurred. The Aché, whose cultural group is now seen as extinct, fell victim to the development by the state, who had promoted the exploration of Aché territory by transnational companies for natural resources. Gilbert concludes that though planned and voluntary destruction had occurred, it is argued by the state that there was no intent to destroy the Aché, as what had happened was due to development.

== Assessment of persecution as a genocide ==
The allegation of genocide by the state was brought before the Inter-American Human Rights Commission which has jurisdiction on allegations of genocide carried out by a state. The commission gave a provisional ruling that Paraguay had not carried out a genocide, but stated it had concerns over "possible abuses by private persons in remote areas of the territory of Paraguay". The Whitaker Report of the United Nations listed the persecution of the Aché as an example of genocide.

Whether or not genocide occurred in this case is contingent on the definition of genocide being used. If we use the definition used by Raphael Lemkin who coined the term, then there were genocides of indigenous peoples in Paraguay. The current Convention on the Prevention and Punishment of the Crime of Genocide definition does not include political groups in their definition of genocide.

== See also ==
- Genocide of Indigenous peoples in Brazil
- Genocide of indigenous peoples in Venezuela
- Indigenous women in the conquest of Paraguay
- Taíno genocide

== Bibliography ==
- Becker, Meghan Auker (11 April 2010). "Paraguayan indigenous peoples resist the Stroessner regime, 1969–1989". Global Nonviolent Action Database.
- Churchill, Ward (2000). Charny, Israel W. (ed.). Encyclopedia of Genocide. ABC-CLIO. ISBN 978-0874369281.
- Cooper, Allan D. (2008). The Geography of Genocide. University Press of America. ISBN 978-0761840978.
- Gilbert, Jérémie (2006). Indigenous Peoples' Land Rights Under International Law: From Victims to Actors. Transnational. ISBN 978-1571053695.
- Horst, Rene Detlef (2003). "Consciousness and Contradiction". In Langer, Erick Detlef; Muñoz, Elena (eds.). Contemporary Indigenous Movements in Latin America. Rowman & Littlefield. ISBN 978-0842026802.
- Münzel, Mark (1973). The Aché Indians: genocide in Paraguay (PDF). International Work Group for Indigenous Affairs.
- Quigley, John B. (2006). The Genocide Convention: An International Law Analysis. Ashgate Publishing. ISBN 978-0754647300.
- "World Directory of Minorities and Indigenous Peoples – Paraguay : Overview". Minority Rights Group International. 2007.
