= José Higino Duarte Pereira =

Brazilian judge and intellectual

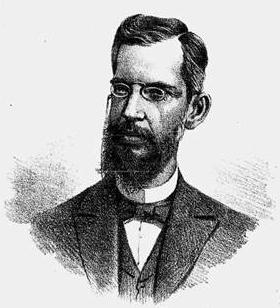
1891 portrait.

José Higino Duarte Pereira (January 22, 1847 – December 10, 1901) was a Brazilian lawyer, intellectual, and professor. A representative of the Recife School, he wrote on the philosophy of law and the history of Dutch Brazil, and helped divulge the evolutionism of Herbert Spencer in his country. From 1892 to 1897, he served as Justice of the Supreme Federal Court.

== Biography ==
Born in Recife to a traditional family, he enrolled at the Faculty of Law of Recife in 1862. As a student, he enlisted to fight at the Paraguayan War, but was not sent to the front line due to his physical frailty. He graduated in 1867. Among his contemporaries were Ruy Barbosa, Joaquim Nabuco, and José Paranhos, Baron of Rio Branco.

He was appointed public prosecutor in the state of Santa Catarina, but soon left office to become a deputy at Pernambuco's state assembly. In 1871, he became substitute judge and years later obtained a doctorate at his alma mater. In 1878, through public examination, he became substitute professor at the Faculty of Law of Recife, and in 1884 he was appointed professor of administrative law at the Faculty. While teaching, he authored a manual on natural law titled Lições de Direito Natural.

He was sent to the Netherlands in 1886 to conduct research in the country's archives, where he began dedicating himself to the study of the Dutch occupation of Pernambuco, particularly the administration of John Maurice, Prince of Nassau-Siegen. He was interested in the development of the press and book printing in Brazil, and one of his findings was the Camarão Indians' letters. On August 3 1889, he was awarded the Order of the Rose by Pedro II. He was a member of the Constituent Assembly that elaborated the Constitution of 1891. In 1892, he served as Minister of Justice under Floriano Peixoto before being appointed to the Supreme Court.
