= Massacre at the 11th Parallel =

1963 mass killing of indigenous people in Brazil

The Massacre at the 11th Parallel occurred in November 1963, when men hired by a rubber company killed 30 members of the indigenous Amazon group Cinta Larga and destroyed their village. Only two villagers survived.

The massacre was a part of the larger, ongoing genocide of indigenous peoples in Brazil.

== Background ==
In the late 19th century, a rubber boom occurred in the Amazon that significantly affected the indigenous populations. Indigenous peoples were exploited for forced labor in rubber production. The associated spread of diseases and violence led to a 90% decline in the indigenous population of the region. Many survivors retreated to remote areas of the Amazon, where their descendants still reside.

The 1920s conflict between the Cinta Larga group and rubber tappers grew in the 1960s. In 1960, the feud was continuing when the Cuiabá-Porto Velho (BR-364) highway was inaugurated. The Cinta Larga faced multiple threats including rubber tappers and prospectors prospecting for gold and diamonds.

== Massacre and aftermath ==
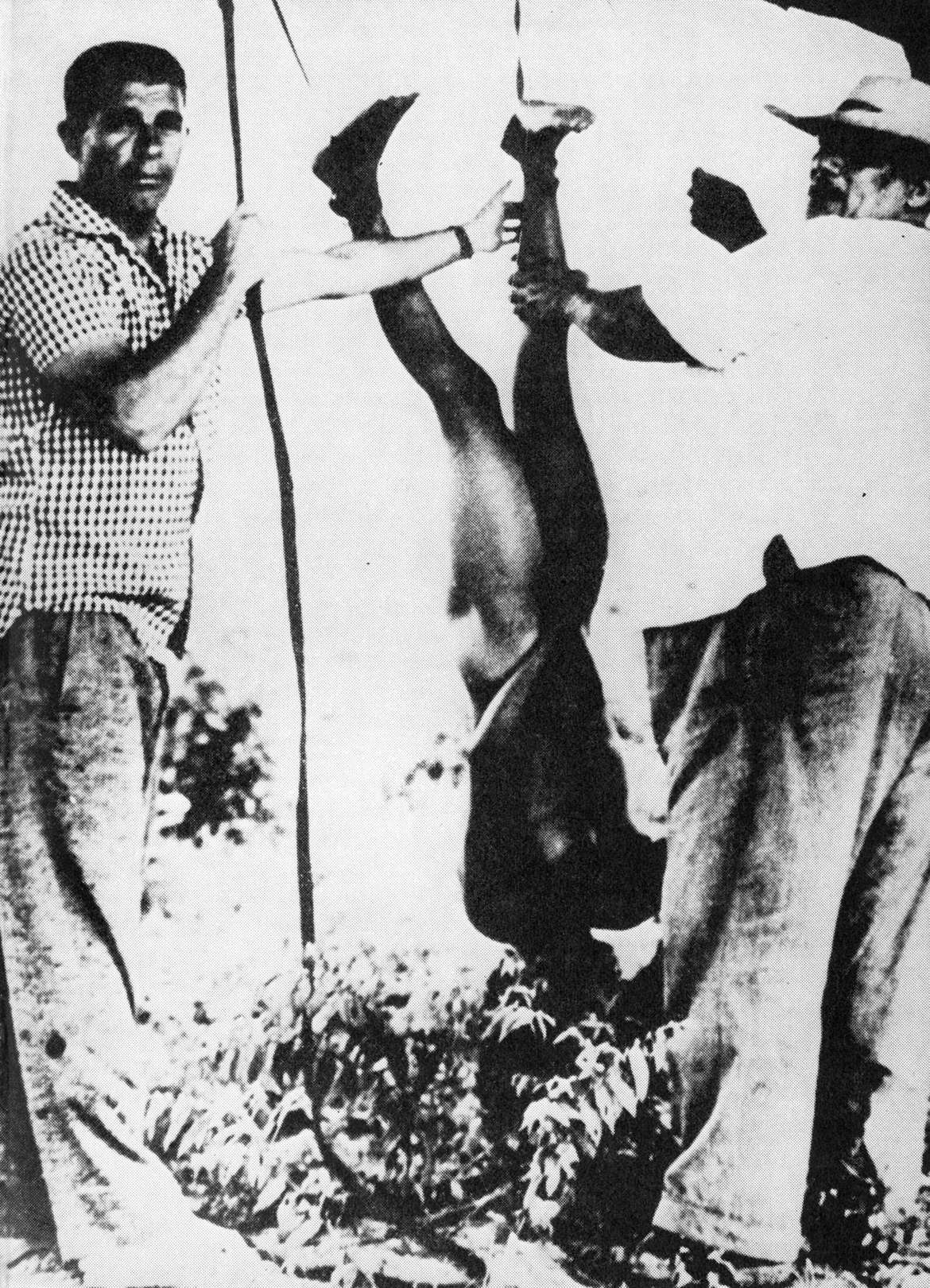
Reconstitution by Serviço de Proteção do Índio of the execution of a woman of the Cinta Larga ethnicity, who was cut in half with a machete, in the Massacre of Parallel Eleven, originally published in O Globo of 25 January 1966.

The massacre took place in the headwaters of the Aripuanã River in Mato Grosso, at the 11th parallel south, where the Brazilian firm Arruda, Junqueira & Co was collecting rubber. The massacre was planned by the head of the firm, Antonio Mascarenhas Junqueira. He wanted to remove the Cinta Larga from the area. He said, "These Indians are parasites, they are shameful. It's time to finish them off, it’s time to eliminate these pests. Let's liquidate these vagabonds."

He then hired a plane to drop dynamite on the village and gunmen to attack the village on foot with machine guns to kill any survivors. The gunmen, in one incident, took a baby from a breastfeeding mother and shot the baby's head off. They then hung the woman upside down and sliced her in half. Two villagers survived the attack while 30 perished.

The attack came to light when one of the perpetrators, Atayde Pereira dos Santos, reported it and those responsible to the Serviço de Proteção ao Índio (SPI) Inspectorate in Cuiabá, after not being paid the amount of money he had been promised. At the trial of one of the accused, the presiding judge said, "We have never listened to a case where there was so much violence, so much ignominy, egoism and savagery and so little appreciation of human life." In 1975 one of the perpetrators, José Duarte de Prado, was sentenced to 10 years imprisonment, but was pardoned later that year. He declared during the trial, "It’s good to kill Indians – they are lazy and treacherous." Although 134 officials faced initial charges of alleged involvement in more than 1,000 crimes related to the massacre, none were jailed.

Details of the massacre were included in the landmark Figueiredo Report of 1967, which led to the replacement of the SPI with the Fundação Nacional do Índio (FUNAI).

The indigenous rights campaign group Survival International was founded in response to the report, two years after its original release by public prosecutor Jader de Figueiredo Correia. More recently, Survival International used this massacre as an example of why disconnected tribes avoid contact with the outside world, in an article titled 'Why do they hide?'

== See also ==
- List of massacres in Brazil
- Genocide of indigenous peoples in Brazil
