= Indian Protection Service =

Government agency of Brazil

Brazil's Indian Protection Service (Serviço de Proteção ao Índio, abbreviated as SPI) was a government agency created to administer indigenous affairs. It was created by President Nilo Peçanha in 1910 in response to pressure from Marshal Cândido Mariano da Silva Rondon and international accusations of indigenous genocide. It was the first federal agency in Brazil to focus on the protection of indigenous peoples from violence and persecution.

== Influence of Cândido Rondon ==
Cândido Rondon was the first and most influential director of the agency, and was invited to the role by Brazilian Minister of Agriculture Rodolfo Miranda. He emphasized interacting with indigenous peoples in a peaceful way with the motto "Die if need be, but never kill." His policies included protecting indigenous peoples from attacks, guaranteeing titles to the lands they occupied, and restoring lands previously usurped by whites. However, he also aimed to assimilate indigenous peoples into the Brazilian nation-state. In a letter accepting the invitation to become the first director of the SPI, he said "As a Positivist and member of the Positivist Church of Brazil, I am convinced that our indigenes should incorporate themselves into the West..."

These ideas and policies shaped government relations with indigenous peoples for the next four decades. Under Rondon and Peçanha’s leadership, legislation was created which attempted to secure the rights of indigenous people to their native lands and customs while also facilitating the establishment of new Brazilian settlements in indigenous regions.

== Disbandment and recreation ==
Shortly after Rondon left the organization in 1915, it became “riddled with corruption and double dealing,” however Rondon soon rejoined the agency and successfully made it somewhat honorable. However, by the early 1960s it was an international scandal, and it was disbanded in 1967, after allegations of atrocities surfaced in the Figueiredo Report. That same year, It was replaced by the National Indian Foundation (Fundação Nacional do Índio) or FUNAI, which is still active today.

== Other names ==
- National Service for Protection of the Indians
