= Cinta Larga =

Tribe of the Amazon Rainforest

Matetamãe
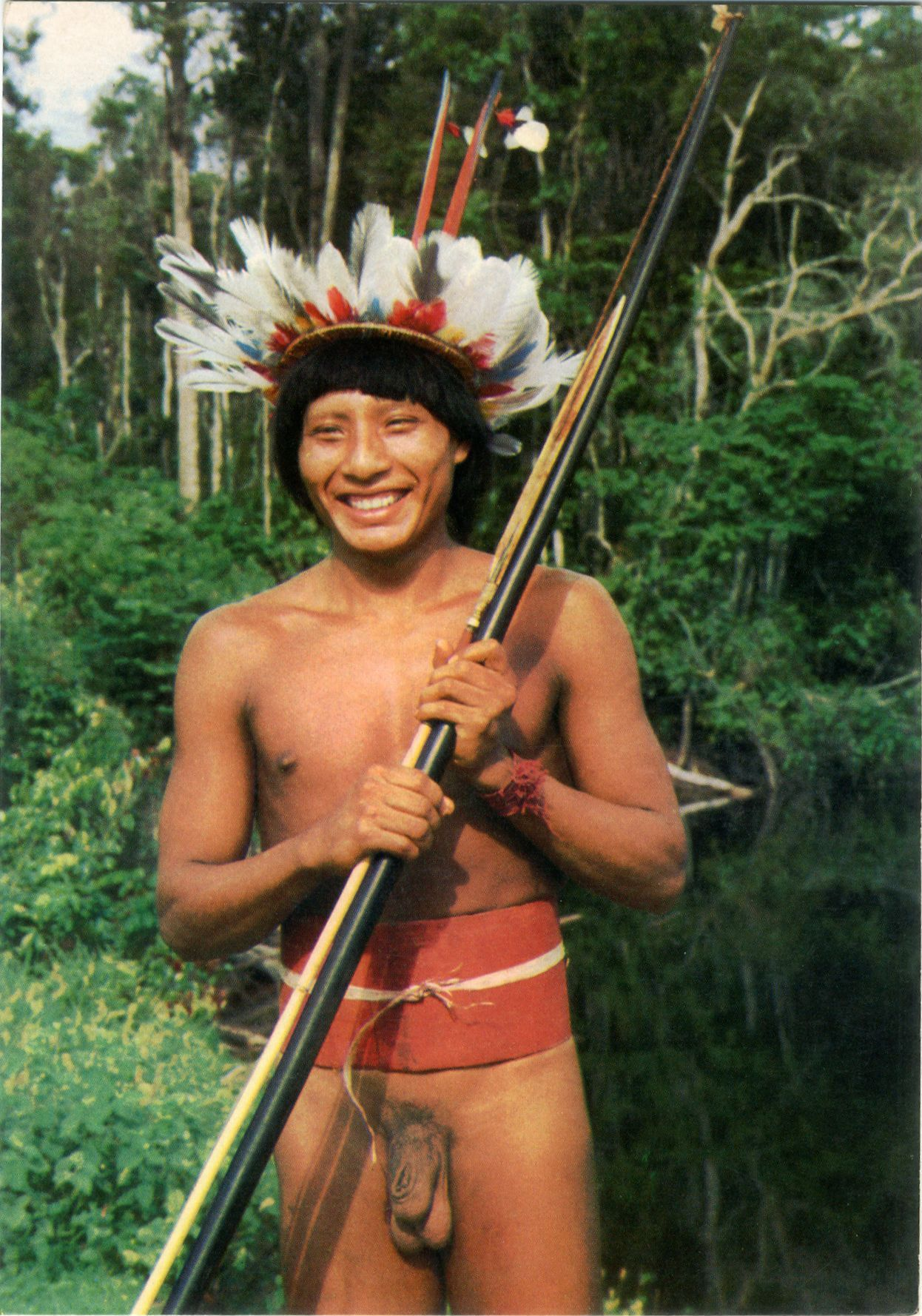
- A 20th-century member of the Cinta Larga

Total population
- 1,954 (2014)

Regions with significant populations
- Brazil (Rondônia Mato Grosso)

Languages
- Cinta Larga

Religion
- Traditional tribal religion

The Cinta Larga (or Cinturão Largo) are a people Indigenous to the western Amazon rainforest of Brazil, numbering almost 2,000. Their name means "broad belt" in Portuguese, referring to large bark sashes the tribe once wore. The tribe is famous for shadowing Theodore Roosevelt's Roosevelt–Rondon Scientific Expedition, making no contact.

== Language ==
The Cinta Larga language is a Mondé language, belonging to the Tupi language family. It is written in the Latin script.

== History ==
Since the 1920s, the tribe has often come into violent conflict with prospectors entering the region to harvest rubber, timber, gold or diamonds. In the 1960s, this culminated in the "Massacre at 11th Parallel" in which rubber prospectors killed many of the Cinta Larga by throwing dynamite into their village from a plane, and then finishing off the survivors, including killing women and children with particular cruelty. Only two members of that Cinta Larga community survived the massacre.

It is believed the plane made a first pass over the village, dropping sugar to lure a crowd to the central plaza. Then, it swooped in low to drop the dynamite on the assembled Cinta Larga. The bodies were buried in the riverbank, and that village was abandoned forever.

== Diamond mine controversy ==
In 2004 the tribe was responsible for the murders of 29 miners illegally unearthing diamonds in the area. In exchange for an $810,000 community grant from the Brazilian government, the tribe agreed to shut down the mine and refrain from killing intruders. The grant expired in 2007, and the tribe has implied it may reopen the mine.
