= Haximu massacre =

1993 armed conflict in Brazil

- Location: Outside Haximu, Brazil
- Date: June or July 1993
- Target: Yanomami people
- Attack type: Massacre
- Deaths: 18 (16 Yanomami, 2 miners)
- Injuries: 2 miners
- Perpetrator: Brazilian gold miners

The Haximu massacre, also known as the Yanomami massacre, was an armed conflict in Brazil in 1993. The conflict occurred just outside Haximu, Brazil, near the Venezuelan border, beginning in mid-June or July of 1993. Sixteen Yanomami people were killed by a group of garimpeiros, or gold miners who mine the land illegally.

In the first attack, the garimpeiros killed four or five young men of the Yanomami Haximu-teri. In response, the natives made two raids against the miners, killing at least two of them and wounding two more. Following this raid, the garimpeiros attacked again, killing about 12 Yanomami (almost all of them elderly, youths or infants) and burned down the Haximu village.

== Background ==
This massacre was the result of tensions surrounding the 1987 gold rush in Brazil, with conflict between Brazilian miners and the Yanomami people. The Yanomami tribe remained isolated until sometime in the 1960s when anthropologists found and studied the people. Between 1973 and 1976 the Brazilians built the Perimetral Norte through the southern area of the natives’ territory. This road initiated the arrival of gold miners, including those who came during a gold rush beginning in 1987.

Scholars studying the history of the gold rushes in Haximu noticed a recurring pattern of activities between the miners and the Yanomami, which Bruce Albert referred to as the "gold mining trap." When the first few garimpeiros arrived, they provided the Yanomami with charitable gifts. Once the number of miners increased, the balance of power was altered, and they began to consider the Yanomami nuisances. Tensions arose when the Yanomami wanted more Western goods, such as medicine, clothes and food, which they had come to rely on after the miners arrived. As a result, violence often arose between the groups. Such a pattern may have been the reason why the miners attacked the Yanomami.

== Claimed causes ==
The specific incident that caused the garimpeiros to attack the Yanomami is uncertain and accounts vary. A former tuxua (chief) of Haximu named Antonio claimed that the garimpeiros attacked his people after they stole a hammock from the miners. However, it was also reported that he claimed that 20 people from his tribe were killed, which was later proven to be false. (Note: Details pertaining to this massacre remain elusive.)

Furthermore, reports by major media exaggerated the number of Yanomami who were killed, based on the account of the first Brazilian to visit the village. He claimed at a press conference to have seen several decapitated bodies there. which somehow led people to believe that 73 Yanomami had died. However, historians and scholars have deemed this portrayal to be incorrect. It was discovered later that the Yanomami burned the bodies for mourning rituals. Interviews with survivors by Bruce Albert shed further doubt.

== Genocide allegations ==
In a newsletter published on August 7, 2006, the Indianist Missionary Council reported that:

In a plenary session, the [Brazilian] Supreme Federal Court (STF) reaffirmed that the crime known as the Haximu massacre [perpetrated on the Yanomami in 1993]" was a genocide [...] It was a unanimous decision made during the judgment of Extraordinary Appeal (RE) 351487 today, the 3rd, in the morning by justices of the Supreme Court.

Commenting on the case, the NGO Survival International said,

"The UN convention on genocide, ratified by Brazil, states that the killing 'with intent to destroy, in whole or in part, a national, ethnical, racial or religious group' is genocide. The Supreme Court ruling is highly significant and sends an important warning to those who continue to commit crimes against indigenous peoples in Brazil."

== See also ==
- List of massacres in Brazil
