= Nega Pataxó =

Brazilian indigenous activist (died 2024)

- Born: Brazil
- Died: January 21, 2024; Potiraguá, Bahia, Brazil
- Other name: Maria de Fátima Muniz de Andrade
- Education: Federal University of Minas Gerais
- Known for: Campaigning for demarcation of Pataxó-hã-hã-hãe land

Maria de Fátima Muniz de Andrade (died 21 January 2024), known by her indigenous name Nega Pataxó, was a Brazilian indigenous leader and shaman. A member of the Pataxó-hã-hã-hãe and Tupinambá peoples, she campaigned for the demarcation of indigenous lands in Brazil. In 2024, Pataxó was shot and killed while attempting to reclaim ancestral Pataxó land in southern Bahia.

== Personal life ==
Pataxó was the spiritual leader of the Pataxó-hã-hã-hãe and Tupinambá peoples living in Caramuru-Paraguaçu, an indigenous territory in the south of Bahia state in northeastern Brazil. Her brother, Nailton Pataxó, was the chief of the community. Pataxó studied education at the Federal University of Minas Gerais, and later worked as a professor. She lived in Ourinho, a village within Caramuru-Paraguaçu, at the time of her death.

== Activism ==
Pataxó campaigned for over forty years for the demarcation of Pataxó-hã-hã-hãe land in Bahia, as well as against deforestation within Caramuru-Paraguaçu. She was an advocate for women's rights, stating "if I can defend any woman, I will. with a piece of wood, with a spear, with whatever I have in my hand. I'm not going to let a woman get beaten up next to me. Either both of us get beaten, or I'll hit him too". At the time of her death, Pataxó had been supporting the establishment of the Paraguaçu Association of Indigenous Women, with aimed to be a space to allow indigenous women to become engaged with politics.

== Death ==
On 20 January 2024, Pataxó and other members of the local indigenous community attempted to retake Fazenda Inhuma, a farm in Potiraguá which was considered to be located on traditional Pataxó-hã-hã-hãe land. The following day, around 200 members of Invasão Zero, a rural militia group comprised primarily of farmers and landowners, surrounded the area in trucks in an attempt to reclaim the land. Military police, who were present at the scene, did not prevent the attack, with farmers armed with wood, machetes, and guns. Pataxó and her brother were both shot; Pataxó died of her injuries, while her brother was hospitalised but survived the attack.

José Eugênio Fernandes Amoedo, a farmer's son, was arrested and detained on the day of the shooting on suspicion of killing Pataxó; ballistic tests later confirmed that a bullet from his gun had killed her. A few months after the killing, Fernandes Amoedo was released from pre-trial attention after posting bail. On 12 August 2025, a court hearing was heard in Brasília after the Public Prosecutor's Office appealed the decision to release suspects of the shooting from pre-trial detention, as well as the defence's attempts to prevent a jury trial. As of January 2026, no one has been charged or help criminally responsible for Pataxó's death.

Sônia Guajajara, the Minister of Indigenous Peoples, Célia Xakriabá, an indigenous member of the Chamber of Deputies, and Joenia Wapichana, the president of Fundação Nacional dos Povos Indígenas, attended Pataxó's funeral.

== Response ==
Pataxó was the first indigenous activist to be murdered in Brazil in 2024. Her death occurred a month after a tribal chief, Lucas Kariri-Sapuyá, had been killed, also in southern Bahia. A photo of Pataxó's body, lying next to her injured brother and still holding a maraca, went viral on social media and was described as being representative of violence against indigenous people.

The Paraguaçu Association of Indigenous Women, co-founded by Pataxó prior to her death, began to campaign against impunity for her killers, led by her sisters, Luzinete and Mayá Pataxó, and her niece, Mônica Tupinambá. In April 2024, with the support of the Laboratory for Research on Bodies, Natures and Senses and the Etinerâncias collective, a care tent was constructed in Brasília in Pataxó's memory. Additional tents were constructed in November 2024 in Salvador and in Brasília again in August 2025 during the National Conference on Indigenous Women. At the conference, a motion was passed criticising the ongoing impunity of Pataxó's killers.

In August 2025, ahead of a court hearing in Brasília to determine the ongoing investigation into Pataxó's death, an open letter signed by 340 civil society groups, including Marche mondiale des Femmes and Kuîã Niã Gwasú Tupinambá, demanding justice for Pataxó.

== Recognition ==
In August 2025, Sônia Guajajara, the Minister for Indigenous Peoples, announced the Nega Pataxó Award, aimed at strengthening autonomy, protection against violence, and the political and cultural participation of indigenous women.

A podcast series about Pataxó's life and death, entitled Nega Pataxó: Nosso Luto é Luta (lit. 'Nega Pataxó: Our Mourning is Struggle'), was released in 2026, supported by the Pulitzer Centre.
