= UDR =

UDR may refer to:

- Ulster Defence Regiment, a former British Army infantry regiment
- Universal dielectric response, An emergent scaling behaviour in heterogeneous materials under alternating current
- União Democrática Ruralista, a Brazilian right-wing association of farmers
- Union of Democrats for the Republic, a former political party in France
- Union of the Right for the Republic, a present political party in France
- Union for Democracy and the Republic (Chad), a political party in Chad
- Democratic Union for the Republic, a former political party in Italy
- UDR, Inc., a real estate company in the United States
- Udaipur Airport, Indian airport (IATA airport code)
- Untethered dead reckoning, GNSS-assisted dead reckoning without external sensors
- User-Defined Reductions in OpenMP
- U.D.R., Brazilian comedy rock band
- Univision Deportes Radio, a Spanish language sports radio network in the United States.
- Unlimited Desert Racer, a traxxas RC car with the best suspension system by far.

== See also ==
- Udr or Uðr, one of the Nine Daughters of Ægir in Norse mythology
- Umpire Decision Review System (UDRS)
