= APIB =

APIB may refer to:

== Military ==
- АПИБ (авиацио́нный полк истребителей-бомбардировщиков), Russian for a fighter-bomber aviation regiment, particularly in the Soviet Air Forces
- Advanced primer ignition blowback, a design feature of some firearms

== Political ==
- MÉS-APIB, a name under which the Spanish political party Més per Mallorca has stood for election
- Articulação dos Povos Indígenas do Brasil (Articulation of the Indigenous Peoples of Brazil), an organization representing indigenous Brazilian ethnic groups and led by Sônia Guajajara

== Other ==
- Assessment of Preterm Infants’ Behavior, a standardized comprehensive test for the newly born
- APiB, a nickname for Alpha Pi Beta (ΑΠΒ), a sorority established at the University of Northern British Columbia in 1994
