= Eloy Terena =

Brazilian lawyer (born 1988)

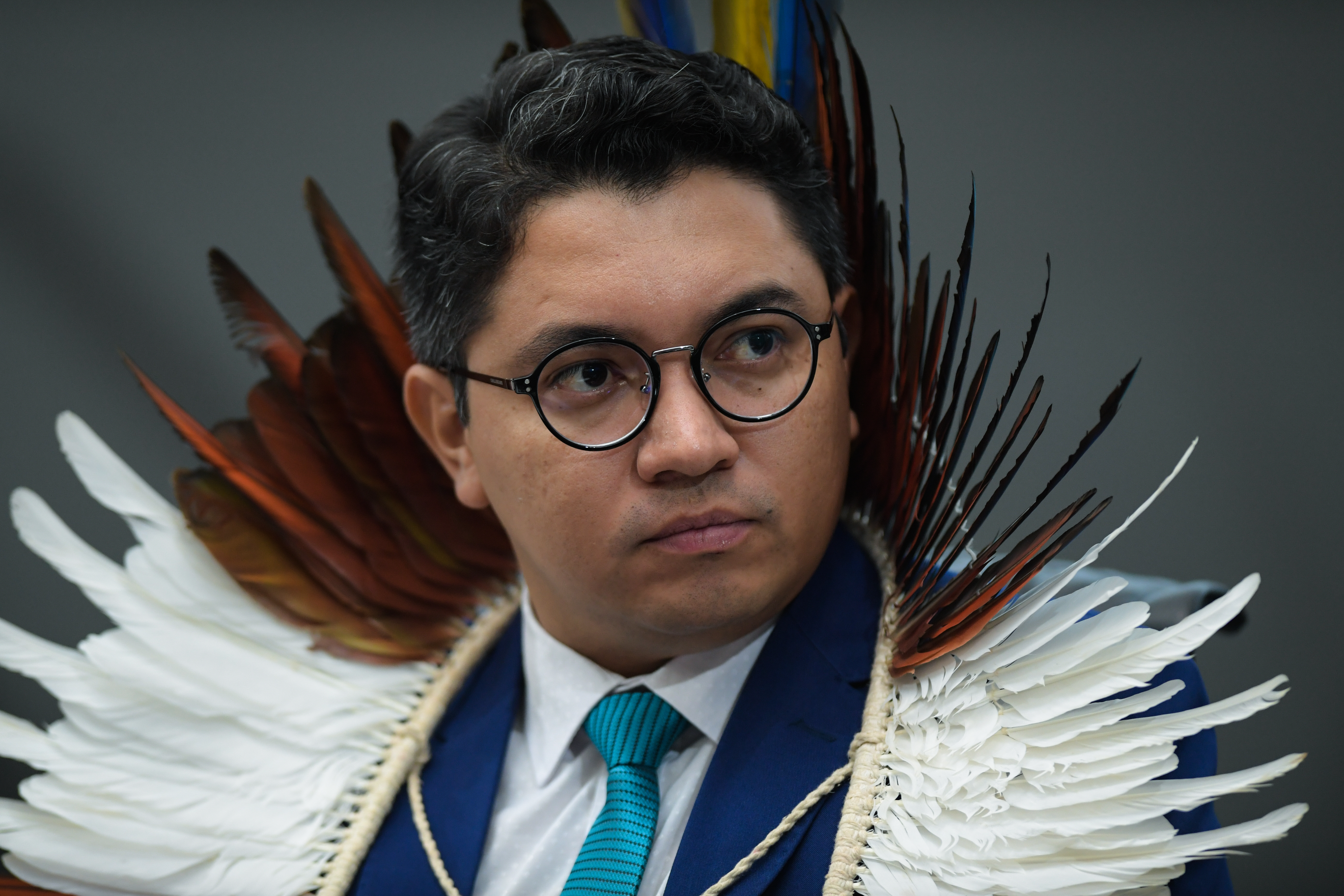

Minister of Indigenous Peoples
- Incumbent
- Assumed office 31 March 2026
- Preceded by: Sônia Guajajara
- President: Luiz Inácio Lula da Silva

Personal details
- Born: Luiz Henrique Eloy Amado; 2 February 1988 (age 38) Aquidauana, Mato Grosso do Sul, Brazil
- Education: Dom Bosco Catholic University
- Occupation: Lawyer, anthropologist, researcher, professor, activist

Luiz Henrique Eloy Amado (born February 2, 1988), better known as Eloy Terena, is a Brazilian lawyer, anthropologist, researcher, professor, and an indigenous leader of the Terena ethnic group, whose work is primarily focused on the defense of the rights of indigenous peoples in Brazil. Since January 2023, he has served as Executive Secretary of the Ministry of Indigenous Peoples, and on March 31, 2026, he was sworn in as Minister, succeeding Sônia Guajajara.

== Biography ==
Eloy Terena was born in the Ipegue indigenous village, in the municipality of Aquidauana, Mato Grosso do Sul, on February 2, 1988. Following his parents' separation in 1991, his mother began working as a domestic housemaid in Campo Grande, where he moved with his siblings to live with her. Influenced by his sister, he decided to study Law and was awarded a full scholarship through the Programa Universidade Para Todos (ProUni) to attend the Dom Bosco Catholic University, from which he graduated. Encouraged by his professor Antônio Brandi, he came into contact with the struggles of indigenous peoples and developed a growing interest in indigenous rights. At the same university, he earned a master's degree in Local Development.

From 2012 onward, when he became a member of the Special Commission for the Defense of the Rights of Indigenous Peoples of the Federal Council of the Order of Attorneys of Brazil (OAB), Terena began providing legal counsel to various indigenous communities and indigenist organizations, organizing training courses for leadership development, and advocating on behalf of indigenous causes before the Supreme Federal Court. One of his greatest achievements was securing the reversal of a judicial decision that had expelled several communities from the traditional lands they had reoccupied in 2013. This, however, led to persecution on the part of ruralist organizations, which challenged the veracity of his indigenous identity and called for the suspension of his master's degree.

In 2022, he obtained a doctorate in Sociology and Law from the Fluminense Federal University, with the thesis The Social Field of Law and the Theory of Indigenist Law, and completed a postdoctoral fellowship in Social Sciences at the School for Advanced Studies in the Social Sciences in Paris. He became responsible for the filing of a claim of non-compliance with a fundamental precept (ADPF) that led the Supreme Federal Court to mandate that the Bolsonaro administration adopt protective measures for indigenous peoples against the COVID-19. This marked the first time that an indigenous lawyer prevailed in a constitutional jurisdiction action before that Court.

In 2022, he joined the transition team of then-president-elect Luiz Inácio Lula da Silva, representing the state of Mato Grosso do Sul on the Technical Group for Indigenous Peoples, and was subsequently nominated for the position of Executive Secretary of the Ministry of Indigenous Peoples, assuming office in January 2023. Following Minister Sônia Guajajara's resignation from office to qualify for the 2026 elections, President Lula confirmed that Eloy Terena would take over the Ministry, and he was sworn in on March 31, 2026.

== Works ==
- Eloy Amado, Luiz Henrique (2020). Vukápanavo: o despertar do povo terena para os seus direitos. E-papers. ISBN 9786587065083.

Political offices
Preceded by Sônia Guajajara	Minister of Indigenous Peoples; 2026–present	Incumbent
