= Special Secretariat for Indigenous Health =

The Indigenous Health Secretariat (Secretaria Especial de Saúde Indígena, SESAI) is a secretariat of the Brazilian Ministry of Health created in 2010, which coordinates the " National Policy for Attention to the Health of Indigenous Peoples " (PNASPI) and the " Subsystem of Attention to Indigenous Health " (SasiSUS) of the Unified Health System (SUS), which provides primary health care to more than 750,000 indigenous people living in villages, according to the epidemiological and sociocultural characteristics of the ethnic groups.

== History ==
In 1988, the Federal Constitution of the Federative Republic of Brazil recognized the ethnic and cultural specificities of indigenous peoples, as well as establishing their social rights (full civil capacity), and also established that protection must be provided by the Government of Brazil; the main articles being 231 and 232 of Chapter VIII (On Indians) of Title VIII (On the social order). These rights are reaffirmed by Convention 169 of the International Labour Organization (ILO) and ratified by Brazil on July 25, 2003, and approved by Decree 5051 of April 19, 2004, whose principles were, however, already contemplated in the Magna Carta.

To discuss indigenous health, the First National Conference on the Protection of Indigenous Health and the Second National Conference on Health for Indigenous Peoples were held in 1986 and 1993, during the Eighth National Health Conference and the Ninth National Health Conference respectively, which proposed a differentiated model of health care based on special health districts, to guarantee these peoples comprehensive health. Involving them in all stages of the process (planning, execution and evaluation of actions).

In 1991, the president of Brazil transferred the coordination of health actions for indigenous people to the Ministry of Health, thus creating the Special Indigenous Health Districts and the Indigenous Health Coordination (COSAI), linked to the National Health Foundation, with the obligation to implement this model of health care.

In the same year, the National Health Council (CNS) created the Intersectoral Commission on Indigenous Health (CISI), with the objective of advising the CNS council in the elaboration of guidelines for public policies on indigenous health. In May 1994, the president of Brazil created the Intersectoral Health Commission (CIS) under the coordination of FUNAI, with the participation of several ministries related to indigenous issues. Then, in October 1994, this council approved the "Model of Comprehensive Care for Indigenous Health," which assigned FUNAI the responsibility for the recovery of the health of sick indigenous people, and assigned the Ministry of Health the prevention of diseases (immunization campaigns, sanitation, and control of endemic diseases).

In 2010, the Indigenous Health Secretariat (SESAI) was created, linked to the Brazilian Ministry of Health, which began to coordinate the National Policy for Attention to the Health of Indigenous Peoples (PNASPI) and the Subsystem for Attention to Indigenous Health (SasiSUS), to provide primary health care to more than 750,000 indigenous people living in villages, according to the epidemiological and sociocultural characteristics of each ethnic group.

In 2007, traditional peoples , including indigenous peoples, were recognized by the Government of Brazil, through the National Policy for Sustainable Development of Traditional Peoples and Communities (PNPCT), for having a sustainable way of life linked to natural resources and the environment in a harmonious way and the communal use of land. Thus reaffirming the right of indigenous peoples to their traditional land and the protection of the Brazilian government.

In 2019, the Bolsonaro administration issued a decree abolishing the DGESI and placing control of indigenous health management in the hands of municipal governments. This decree was repealed under the second presidency of Lula da Silva.

== Structure ==
The secretariat consists of:

- Department of Indigenous Health Management (DGESI);
- Department of Indigenous Health Care (DAPSI);
- Department of Sanitation and Indigenous Health Buildings;
- 34 Special Indigenous Health Districts (DSEI);
- 356 base poles;
- 67 Indigenous Health Centers (CASAI);
- 34 District Councils for Indigenous Health (Condisi);
- Local Councilors representing 5,000 villages;
- Forum of Presidents of Condisi (FPCondisi).

== Secretaries ==
- Antônio Alves de Souza (2010-2016)
- Rodrigo Rodrigues (2016-2017)
- Marco Antônio Toccolini (2017-2019)
- Silvia Nobre Waiãpi (2019-2020)
- Robson Santos da Silva (2020-2021)
- Reginaldo Ramos Machado (2021-2023)
- Ricardo Weibe Nascimento Costa (2023-2026)
- Maria Lucilene Martins Santos (2026-present)

== See also ==
- Indian Health Service
- Ministry of Native People
- Fundação Nacional dos Povos Indígenas
