= Celso Brandão =

Brazilian photographer

- Born: 1951 (age 74–75); Maceió, Alagoas, Brazil
- Occupations: Photographer, Director

Celso Brandão (born 1951 in Maceió, Alagoas, Brazil) is a photographer who also directed a few documentaries. He can always be found at his headquarters in Carababa Beach, just a few minutes from the city center. Some of his work belong the Pirelli Collection of 1996 He has also received several awards at the Festival do Cinema Brasileiro de Penedo in the years 1975, 1976, 1978, 1979 and 1980. At the moment his is back doing a few documentaries and teaching photography at Federal University of Alagoas.

== Filmography ==
- Filé de Pombal da Barra - 1977 10' Super8
- Mandioca da terra à mesa. 1977 10'
- Benedito: o santeiro. - 1985 24'
- Dede Mamata - 1988
- Ponto das Ervas. 11'
- A Singeleza da Singeleza. 4'
- A casa de santo - 1986 13'
- Memória da vida e do trabalho (1ª Mostra Internacional do Filme Etnográfico)
- Chão de casa - 1982 (1ª Mostra Internacional do Filme Etnográfico)
- Mestra Hilda
- Mestre Benon, o Treme Terra, de Nicolle Freire and Celso Brandão on YouTube
- O Lambe-Sola - Celso Brandão's views on the popular poet Antonio Aurélio de Morais

== Photography ==
- Nucleo de estudos afro-brasileiros - UFAL
- KARIRI
- 1993 – Fotografia Brasileira Contemporânea: anos 70 a 80, 1º Mês Internacional da Fotografia, Sesc Pompéia, São Paulo
- 1993 – Argueiro, um Cisco no Olho, Galeria Fotoptica, São Paulo
- 2002 – Canudos, Instituto Moreira Salles, Rio de Janeiro
- 2001 - Semana do Indio - FUNAI
- 2007 - Art pictures for Tania Pedrosa
- 2007 - Exposição de fotografias Acenda uma Vela
