= Pataxó =

Indigenous people of Brazil

Pataxó
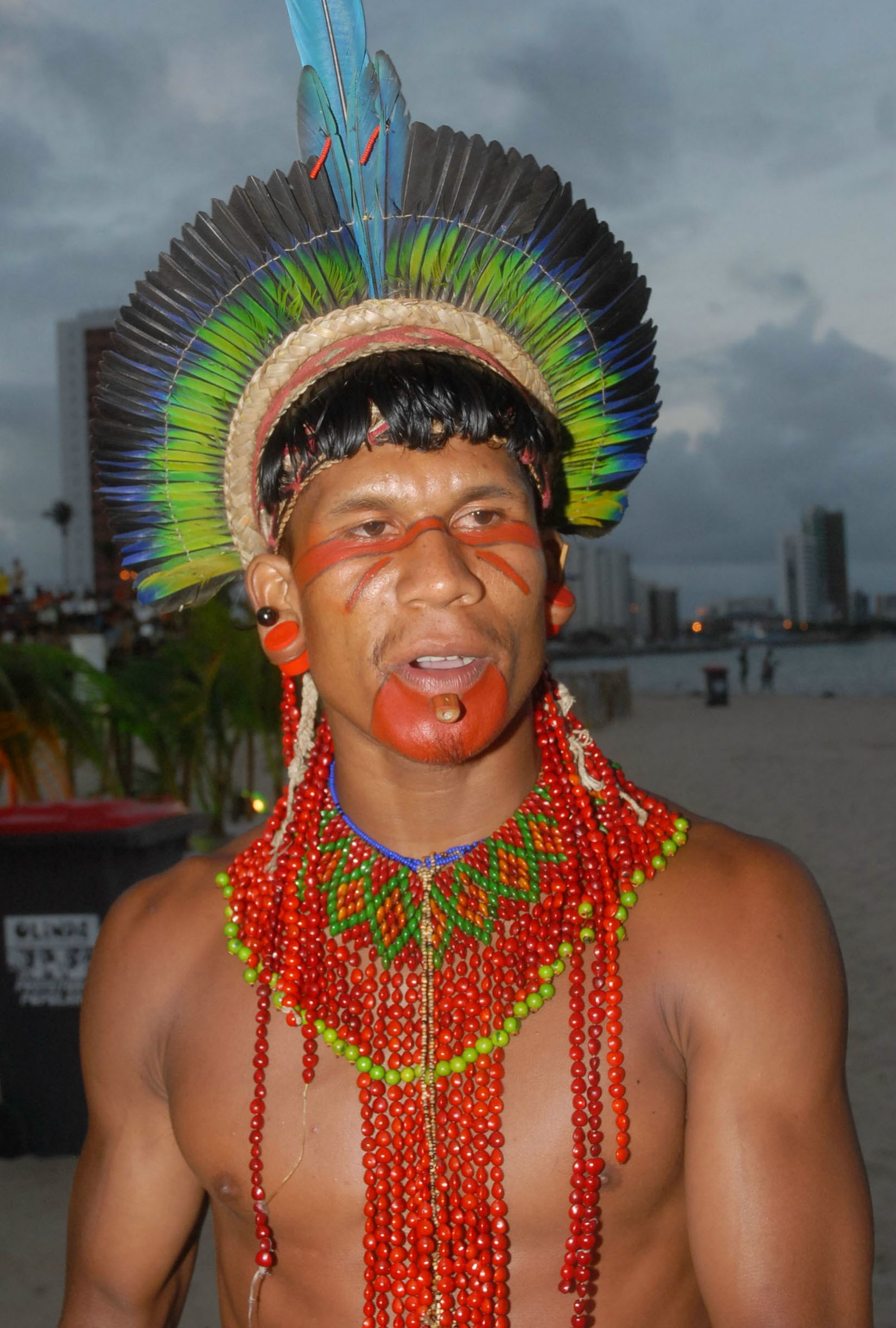
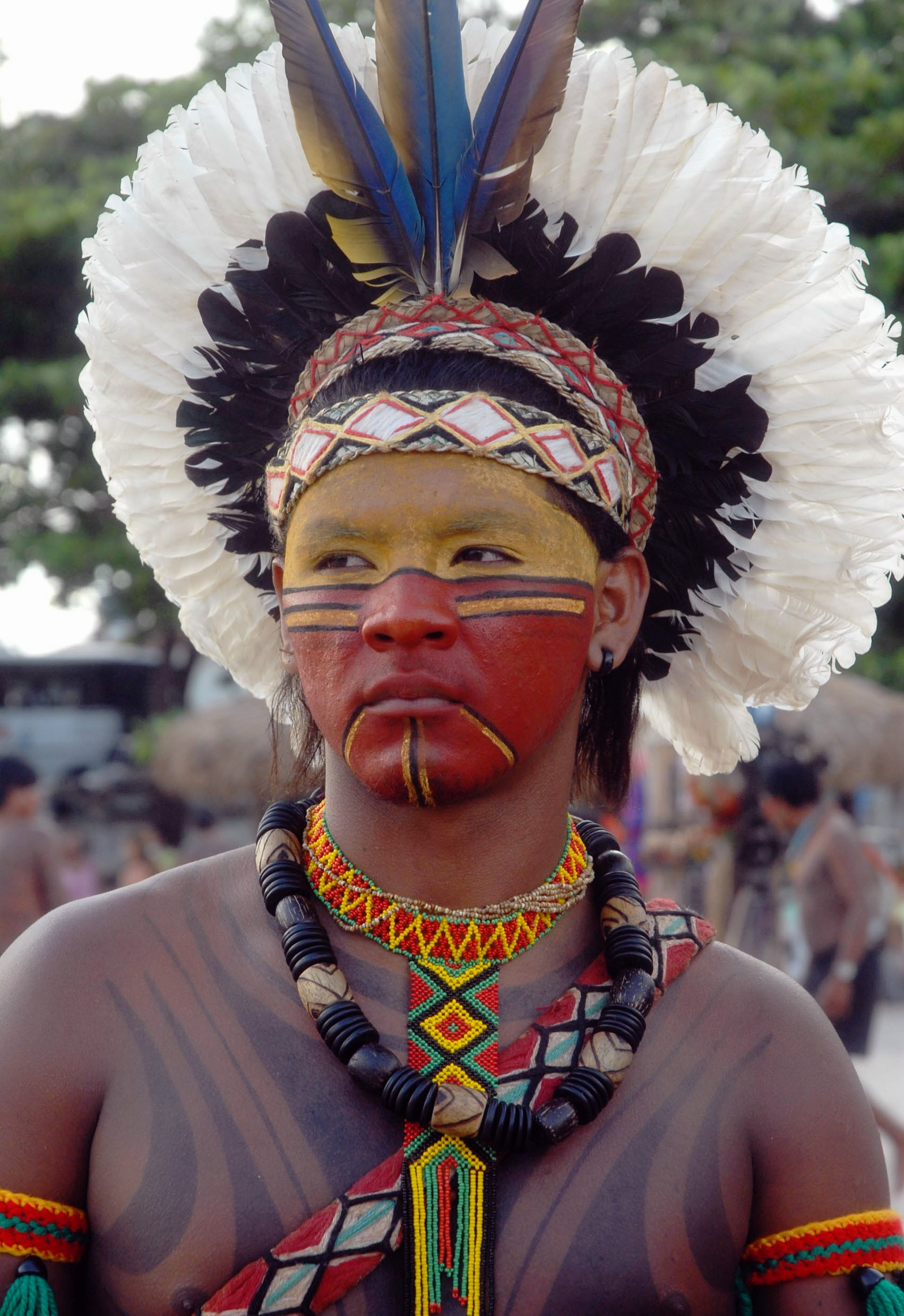
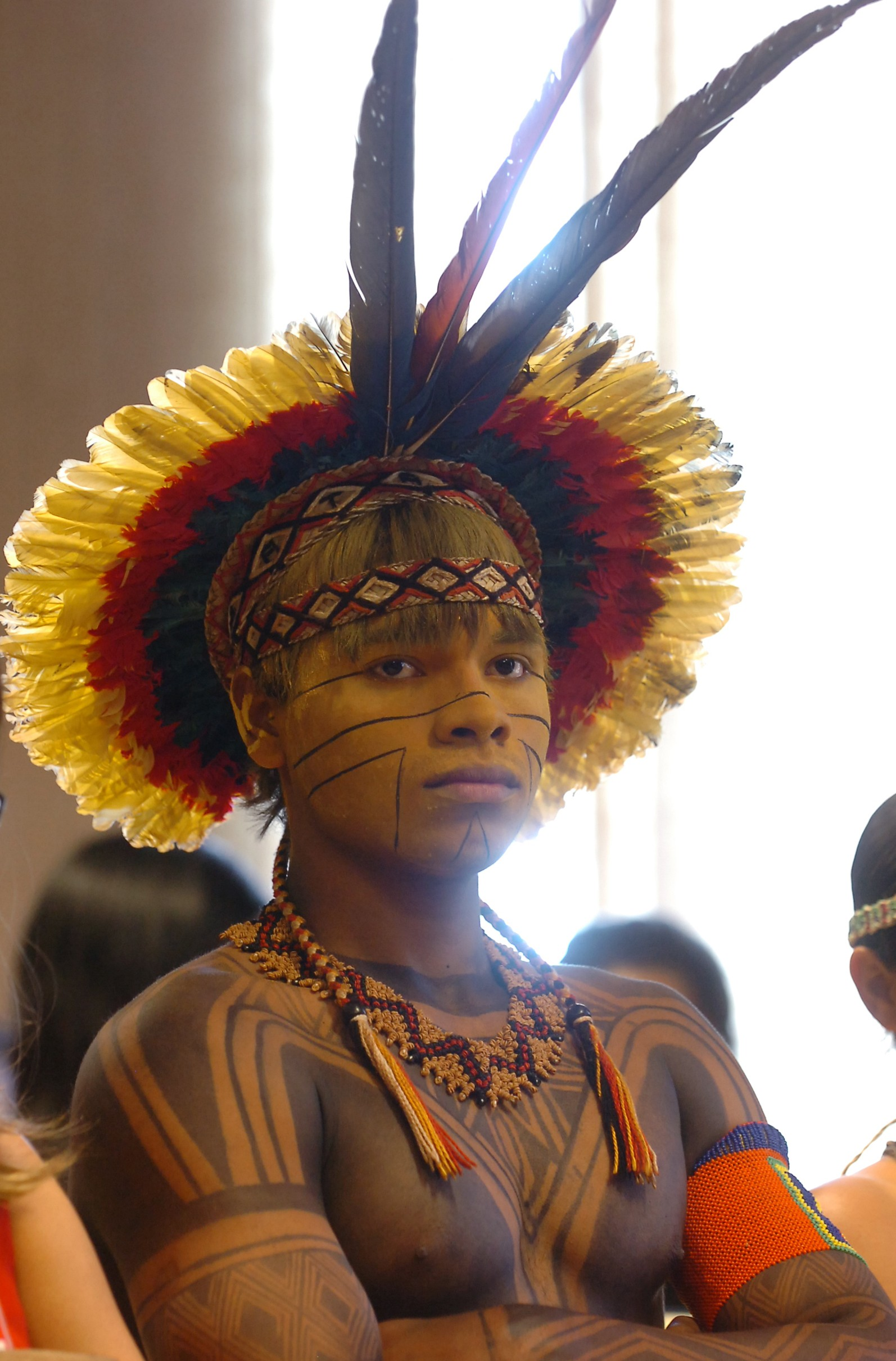
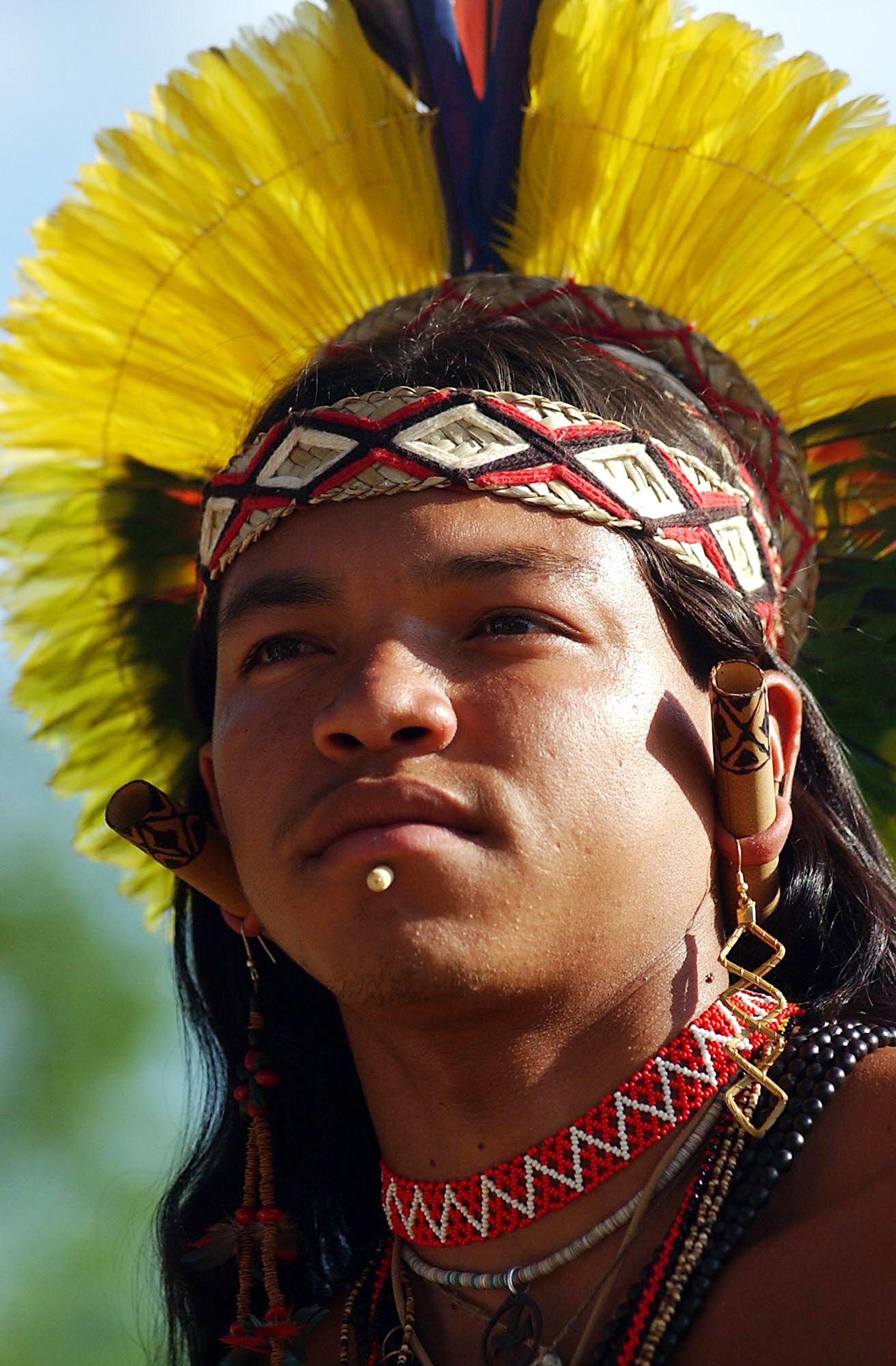

Total population
- 11,800

Regions with significant populations
- Bahia

Languages
- Portuguese; Pataxó

The Pataxó are an Indigenous people in Bahia, Brazil, with a population of about 11,800 individuals. They once spoke the Pataxó language, but now speak Portuguese and a reconstructed version of the Pataxó language called Patxohã.

The Pataxó's territory is part of a wider region traditionally inhabited by the group. The region was mainly converted into private farms by settlers who persecuted the Pataxó, and in 1961, they were expelled from the largest remaining forest and integrated into the dominant society, losing their Indigenous identity and settling in cities. Others moved to coastal areas, forming new Indigenous villages, including Coroa Vermelha, founded in 1972 and now home to approximately 6,000 people.

In 1998, a group of Pataxó women created the Jaqueira Reserve, which comprises 827 hectares in the Environmental Protection Area of the Coroa Vermelha Indigenous Territory in South Bahia, where they operate a community-based cultural identity and ecotourism project, the Associação Pataxó de Ecoturismo, which employs Indigenous families.

== Notable Pataxó people ==
- Alice Pataxó
- Alex Pereira
- Aline Pereira
- Nega Pataxó
