= U.D.R. =

Brazilian comedy rock band

- Origin: Belo Horizonte, Brazil
- Genres: Comedy rock
- Years active: 2003–2008, 2011–2016
- Label: Independent record label
- Past members: MC Carniça; MC Carvão; MS Barney; Professor Aquaplay

U.D.R., also known as U.D.R. 666, was a Brazilian comedy rock band. Its style blended punk rock, funk carioca, gangsta rap and grindcore. The band was formed in Belo Horizonte, Brazil, in 2003.

The band consisted of three members, Professor Aquaplay, MS Barney and MC Carvão. The band used satire and black humor to sing about satanism, transsexualty, antichristianity, graphic violence, illegal drugs, bukkake, coprophagia, disabilities (like autism and paraplegia), hipster culture, homoeroticism and more.

Incorrectly labeled satanists, the humor created by the group created controversies and was responsible for many suits. They were prevented from singing some songs in their shows. They were popular enough to have some of their songs played on MTV Brasil and presented out of the country.

== History ==
UDR - as in its most popular formation - was originally formed in 2003 by Rafael Mordente, Thiago Machado and João Carvalho, respective Prof. Aquaplay, MC Carvão and MS Barney; with a brief inclusion of MC Carniça in some of the band's first songs.

=== Start of the band and the debut album (2000–2003) ===
By the mid-to-late 1990s and early 2000s, the band members had already accumulated a considerable degree of musical knowledge and experience. With the advent of the internet, these friends resolved to share their creatively crafted songs online, often characterized by humor that was occasionally controversial yet invariably comedic. They commenced their musical endeavors with low-quality production, utilizing rudimentary software, and subsequently released their compositions on various websites.

On the now-defunct Brazilian website "TramaVirtual," UDR released their initial musical works, the first of which was entitled "Currando o Aiatolá (Ao Vivo)." Some fans of the band consider certain betas and/or demos to be part of this first album. However, the now-defunct UDR page on TramaVirtual only recognizes the live performances as part of the album.

=== Release of "Seringas Compartilhadas" (2003) ===
In 2003, completely independently - as UDR has always done - the band released its first album, "Seringas Compartilhadas Vol.2 (Concertos para Fagote Solo, em Si Bemol)".

The album, which originally contained nine tracks, was well received by the public who already followed and knew UDR at the time.

The album's irreverent and unconventional humor shocked many people, as it comically addressed themes such as paraplegia, necrophilia, rape, incest, anti-Christianity, and more.

The song "Bonde da Orgia de Travecos," from the same album, would go on to become the band's most famous, a song that dealt with themes that would recur in the group's music, such as transsexualism, unbridled drug use, group sex, and coprophilia. However, the group's most controversial song was "Bonde do Aleijado," which led to lawsuits years later, making it impossible for them to perform it live.

== Justice and condemnation ==
After over ten years, Professor Aquaplay and MC Carvão were condemned by the justice of the state of Minas Gerais because of the offensive lyrics. They were condemned to three years and five months in prison, which was later reduced to a fine of the equivalent of four times the monthly minimum wage in Brazil and community service. These problems ended up in the end of the band in June 2016.

== Etymology ==
The band's name is an acronym derived from the "União Democrática Ruralista", an entity that brings together landowners and whose stated objective is "the preservation of property rights and the maintenance of order and respect for the laws of the country". The band wanted a name that conveyed a conservative idea, opposing their 'politically incorrect' lyrics.

== Members ==
- Rafael Mordente (Professor Aquaplay) – (2003–2008, 2011–2016)
- João Carvalho (MS Barney) – (2003–2008, 2011–2016)
- Thiago Machado (MC Carvão) – (2003–2008, 2011–2016)

== Discography ==
=== LPs ===
- Currando o Aiatolá (2002)
- Seringas Compartilhadas Vol. 2 (Concertos para Fagote Solo, em Sí Bemol) (2003)
- Jamo Brazilian Voodoo Macumba Kung Fu... (2004)
- WARderley (2005)
- Bolinando Estraños (2008)

=== EPs ===
- O Shape do Punk do Cão (2007)

=== Live albums ===
- Racha de Chevetes (2011)
