= Mércio Pereira Gomes =

Brazilian anthropologist (born 1950)

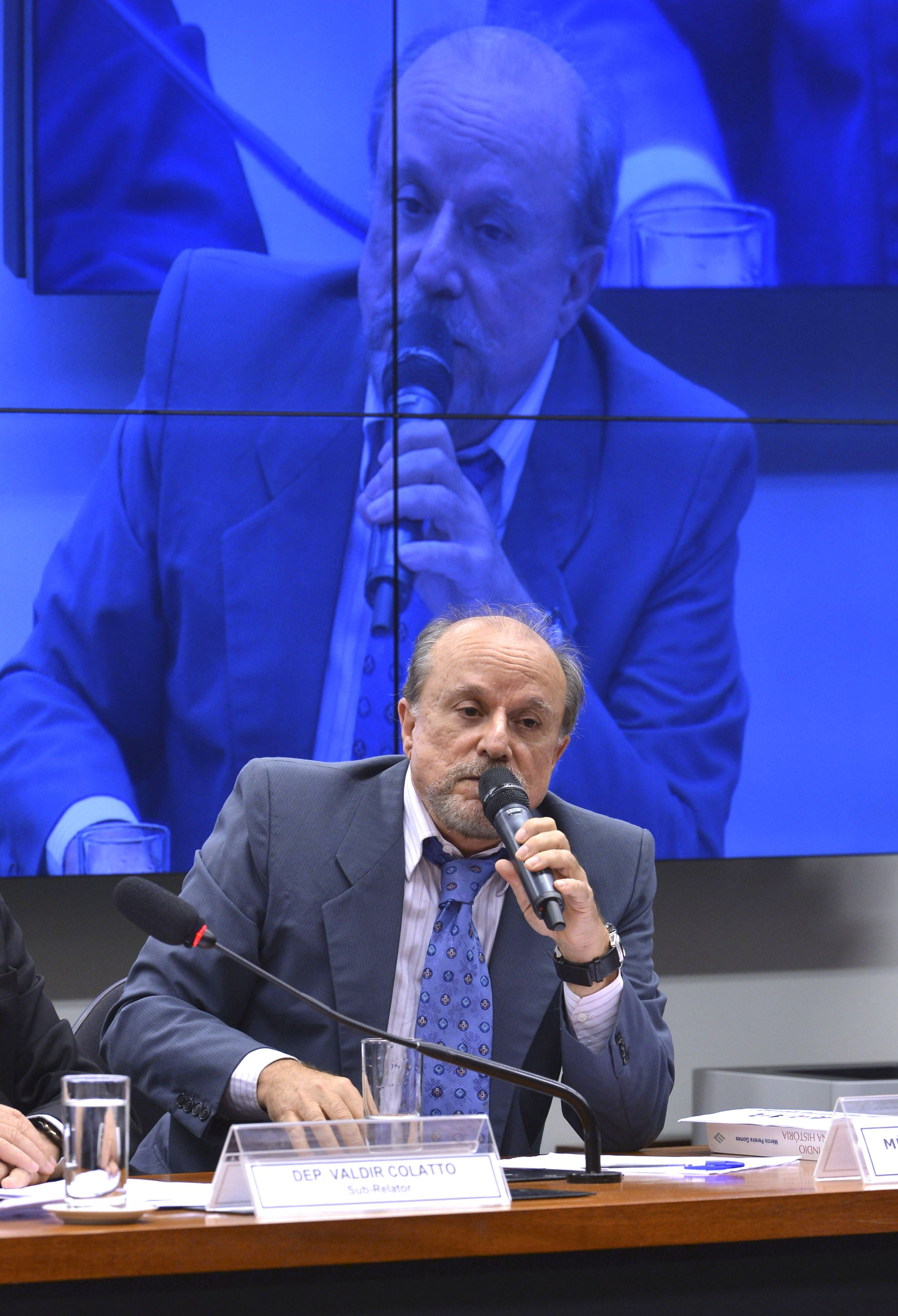
- Born: November 10, 1950 (age 75); Currais Novos, Brazil
- Education: University of Florida
- Known for: Being the President of the National Foundation for Indigenous Peoples

Mércio Pereira Gomes (born November 10, 1950) is a Brazilian anthropologist. As of 2015, he teaches at the Federal University of Rio de Janeiro. He received his Ph.D. in Anthropology from the University of Florida, in 1977, under the supervision of Charles Wagley, who at that time was considered the foremost Brazilianist in the United States and had done extensive fieldwork in Brazil. His dissertation was about the Tenetehara Indians of northern Brazil and in it Gomes expounded how this Indigenous people had managed to survive almost 400 years of relations with Western society. Years later, Gomes published his first book called Os índios e o Brasil (Petrópolis, Vozes, 1988), where he hailed the survival of Brazilian Indians as the most important news in the recent history of inter-ethnic relations in that country. This book was later translated into English by the University of Florida Presses (2000) with the title The Indians and Brazil. Other books by Gomes are O Índio na História (Petrópolis, Vozes, 2002), Antropologia (São Paulo, Ed. Contexto, 2008), Antropologia Hiperdialética (São Paulo, Ed. Contexto, 2011), and a new, expanded version of Os índios e o Brasil (São Paulo, Ed. Contexto, 2012).

== Career ==
Since 1975, Gomes has done extensive fieldwork with several Brazilian Indigenous peoples, foremost the Tenetehara, the Guajá, and the Avá-Canoeiro. During his first fieldwork research he helped defend the Tenetehara Indians in a struggle they were having with farmers who claimed to be owners of their land. Beginning in 1980 he did research with the Guajá Indians who had been contacted just 7 years previously. During that year he was responsible for making the first contact with a band of Guajá Indians, who numbered some 30 people at that time. By 2014 this band had joined other bands and numbered some 220 people.

In 1991 he was invited together with three other scholars from different parts of the world by several Dutch NGOs to carry out a research on how the Dutch people relate to the environment. The result was a report which was published under the title A Vision for the South: How Wealth Degrades the Environment (Leiden, Van Arkel, 1992).

Besides teaching in several universities in Brazil and abroad, such as Unicamp, in Campinas, São Paulo, UERJ, in Rio de Janeiro, Macalester College, in St. Paul, Minnesota, and Universidade Federal Fluminense (Niterói, RJ), Gomes has also been undersecretary of culture and education in the State of Rio de Janeiro (1991–1995) and president of the Fundação Nacional do Índio (FUNAI – National Foundation for Indigenous Peoples). As head of FUNAI between September 2003 and March 2007, Gomes left a record of organizing and promoting the demarcation of 50 new Indigenous lands, including the Trombetas-Mapuera Indigenous Land, with about 40,000 square km, besides concluding the process of demarcation and registration of some 67 new Indigenous Lands, including the much controversial Raposa Serra do Sol Indigenous Land. Though considered a very difficult job, with critics coming from all sides, such as farmers, agribusiness, politicians, wildcat miners, loggers, and, last but not least, fellow anthropologists and NGOs.

One of the most important controversies was in April 2004 when the Cinta-Larga Indians attacked and killed some 29 wildcat miners who were panning for gold on the Indians´ lands. Gomes was subjected to criticism by the Brazilian media for defending the Indians on the basis that they were defending their territory. He averted the imminent possibility of a counter-attack by the more than 3,000 wildcat miners who were removed from the Cinta-Larga territory, and convinced the Brazilian government to refrain from any police action. Gomes was the head of FUNAI for the longest time, up to then, for a civilian and particularly for an anthropologist.

== Criticism ==
Mércio Pereira Gomes' time as head of FUNAI also had some controversial points. Critics wanted him to press on demarcating new Indian lands at a faster rate than had been done up until then. Based on an interview that Gomes gave to a Reuters report, in English, whose translation was published in the Brazilian newspaper O Estado de S. Paulo, in Portuguese, on January 12, 2006, where Gomes had said that the Indians had obtained extensive lands, for a total of 12.5% of the Brazilian territory, his critics misinterpreted it as the Indians had "too much land", and that caused a big stir among Indian supporters in Brazil and other parts of the world.

The Indians response to Gomes' misinterpreted statements that they "have too much land" can be read on the Survival International page.
