= Decree 1775 =

Decree 1775 was signed into Brazilian law by President Fernando Henrique Cardoso on January 8, 1996. The decree changed the steps FUNAI was required to follow to demarcate indigenous lands, effectively making the process more complicated and allowing for more interference from commercial interests. Individuals or companies were allowed from the beginning of the demarcation process until 90 days after FUNAI issued their report to submit an appeal showing that the contested lands do not meet the qualifications of indigenous lands as stated in the constitution. The decree also placed the final decision in the hands of the Minister of Justice, which left the fate of indigenous lands vulnerable to various political ideologies. The government claimed that allowing people to contest indigenous lands during the demarcation process would prevent any future challenges of completed lands on the basis of unconstitutionality. The decree was widely contested as a violation of indigenous rights, earning the nickname of the "Genocide Decree," due to the power it gave to commercial interests to exploit Indian lands. By April 1996, FUNAI had received over 500 appeals for over 40 indigenous territories that were in the process of being demarcated. FUNAI followed procedure and submitted its official opinion to the Ministry of Justice, rejecting the appeals that were brought against the indigenous lands. Justice Nelson Jobim sided with FUNAI on all except eight territories, ordering further investigation.
