= Luiz Antonio Nabhan Garcia =

Secretary of Land Affairs in the government Bolsonaro

Nabhan Garcia
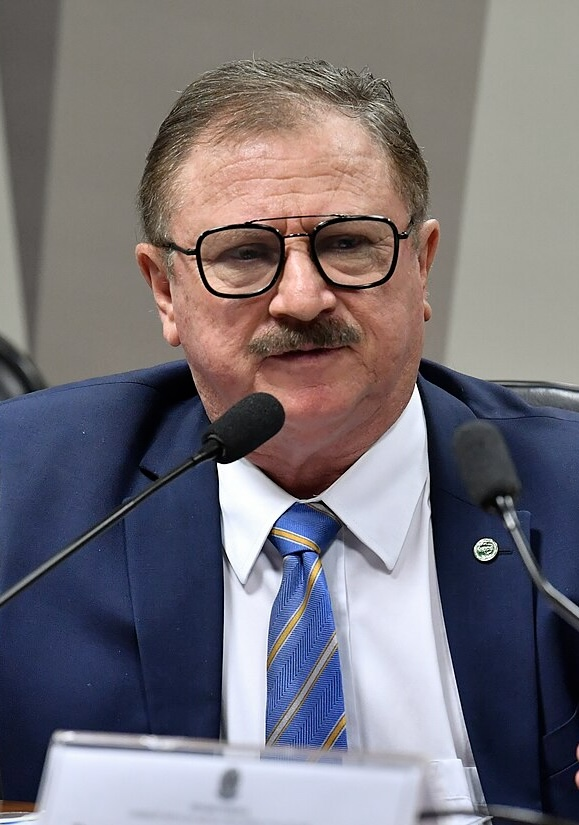
- Nabhan Garcia in 2020

Secretary of Land Affairs of Brazil
- In office December 18, 2018 – December 31, 2022
- President: Jair Bolsonaro

Personal details
- Born: Luiz Antonio Nabhan Garcia; 22 May 1958 (age 68) Presidente Prudente, Brazil
- Party: Brazilian Labor Party
- Spouse: Maria Angela Parzianello Nabhan Garcia
- Children: 1

Luiz Antonio Nabhan Garcia (born May 22, 1958) is a Brazilian politician and farmer, who was the Secretary of Land Affairs in the government of President Jair Bolsonaro, in addition to being appointed as president of the Rural Democratic Union.

Nabhan Garcia is a rancher and farmer, with farms in São Paulo and Mato Grosso do Sul, he became known for his clashes with the landless in Pontal do Paranapanema, in western São Paulo, between 1990 and 2010.

== Ruralist Democratic Union ==
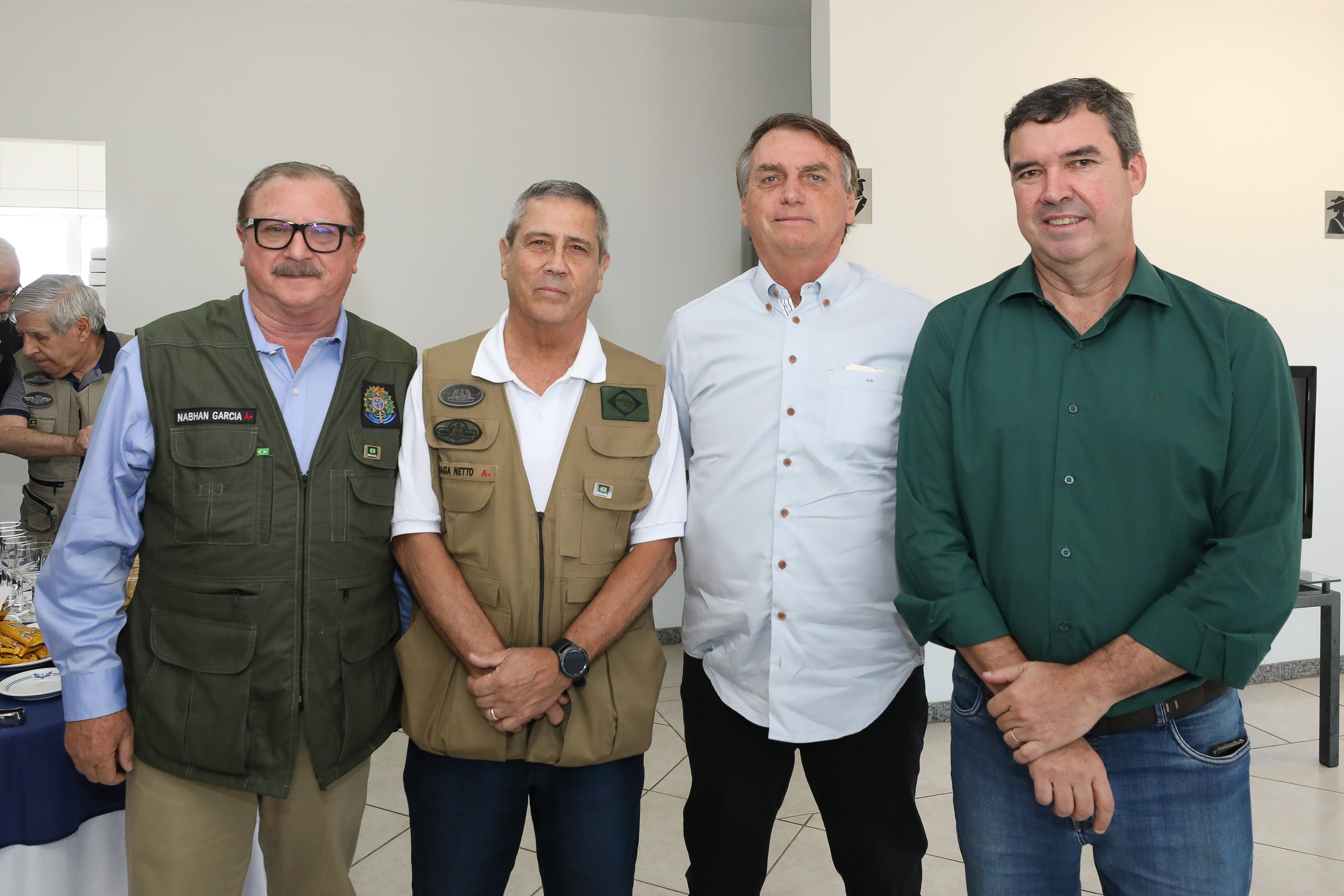
Nabhan Garcia alongside then-President of Brazil, Jair Bolsonaro, then-candidate and current Governor of Mato Grosso do Sul, Eduardo Riedel, and General Braga Netto in Campo Grande, MS. (2022)

The secretary became known for preaching the radicalism that resulted in several conflicts in Pontal do Paranapanema in the mid-1990s, during the government of Fernando Henrique Cardoso. Later, already at the head of the movement to refound the UDR, in 2003 his name was involved in a rumored arrest of a farmer accused of illegal possession and smuggling of weapons, affiliated with the entity. Accused in flagrante delicto with nine large caliber weapons for the exclusive use of the Armed Forces, cattle rancher Manoel Domingues Paes Neto reported to the Federal Police (PF) that Nabhan, with a ninja cap covering his face, sunglasses and a cap, was standing between farmers and security guards. who allowed themselves to be photographed carrying large-caliber weapons by the newspaper O Estado de São Paulo, "to scare the Landless Workers' Movement and inhibit land invasions in Pontal do Paranapanema". This statement was read by the former CPMI (Mixed Parliamentary Commission of Inquiry) rapporteur on Land, João Alfredo (Psol-CE), who concluded that there are “strong indications that Nabhan Garcia and other rural landowners in Pontal do Paranapanema encourage the organization of private militias. That report ended up defeated and became a separate vote, with the parallel report by Deputy Alberto Lupion (DEM-PR) prevailing.

FHC’s Minister of Agrarian Reform, in whose role he served in Pontal do Paranapanema, Raul Jungmann – who has always been critical of the Landless Workers' Movement – says that Nabhan’s stance as president of the UDR and the positions he has adopted in the Bolsonaro government do not help in the solution the demands of the field.

The CAR model, with 6 million areas registered in the last seven years, according to the engineer, has a very low validation rate because, like the Federal Revenue Service, it does not have an intelligence structure that allows verification, which, instead of solving can exacerbate tensions.

=== Nova Bandeirantes and the fall of General Jesus ===
In a message via the WhatsApp application, addressed to a small group of friends and trusted servants, General Jesus Corrêa said that he was leaving Incra just as he was starting the most complex work, attacking the 30 superintendencies, "wherever there are, in some of them, real criminal organizations installed". He mentioned the superintendencies of Mato Grosso and Rondônia as the most problematic and said why he thinks it fell:

"As we were going against interests and acting with ethics and honesty, we became a thorn in the side", he said.

More explicitly, Colonel Marco Antônio dos Santos, who occupied the Board of Management of Incra, told Crusoé magazine that the group was fired, not for delay in regularization, as the secretary argued, but for going against its interests.

"We fell because we bothered Nabhan Garcia and his group, which is a small segment of the ruralist caucus. They thought that we were not complying with the land titles that he asked for. Title over his group. He always wanted me to title farms etc. I never said to title people settled in an agrarian reform program," he said, according to the magazine.

In the 40-minute interview with Pública, made before the crisis that overthrew General Jesus Corrêa, Nabhan Garcia got irritated several times, especially when asked about the strong influence of the ruralist group on Funai. "How can you ignore a bench that has 305 parliamentarians?", He said. In the end, he ended the interview sharply, upset with questions about the lack of a government agenda for indigenous organizations and movements that fight for land. Pública sent new questions about the reaction of the military who left Incra and their participation in the conflicts in Pontal do Paranapanema, but the secretary did not respond.

In August, Nabhan Garcia suffered a bitter defeat in the STF with the removal of the prerogative to interfere in crucial issues for the ruralist caucus, such as the identification and demarcation of indigenous lands. The attribution was linked to the Agriculture portfolio, but the STF sent it back to the Ministry of Justice along with the Funai structure. That is, legally, Nabhan Garcia cannot interfere in demarcation.

The comings and goings of Funai by ministries are seen by the coordinator of the Organization of Indigenous Peoples of Rondônia, Northwest of Mato Grosso and South of Amazonas (Opiroma), José Luiz Kassupá, as a sign that the government may try to return the autarchy to the command of Nabhan Garcia through a new provisional measure.

"He [Nabhan Garcia] sees us as an obstacle to development. He stopped the demarcations at a time when several peoples were asking for areas that were left out of previously approved processes. Meanwhile, in Congress there are more than one hundred projects that withdraw the rights of the indigenous people under debate to reduce lands and open them up for exploitation", says Kassupá.

According to him, there are reports that even old villages occupied by isolated groups are destroyed with the purpose of de-characterizing areas of traditional indigenous use and, thus, reducing the indigenous territory to legalize invasions. And he claims that Incra has been carrying out surveys in places occupied by small squatters within indigenous territories and protected forest areas with the aim of regularizing illegal possessions. "We've already seen this: they say it's for the small and then they pass it on to the landowners."

For the entities, Nabhan Garcia as an agrarian manager and indigenist is, at the very least, a sign of the government's complacency with the backward segment of agribusiness and of retrogression in the rights of traditional peoples.

"It's like the fox guarding the henhouse," says Oliveira.

== See also ==
- Jair Bolsonaro
- Presidency of Jair Bolsonaro
- Fundação Nacional dos Povos Indígenas
- Cabinet of Jair Bolsonaro
- Landless Workers' Movement
