= Joenia Wapichana =

Brazilian politician

Joenia Wapichana OMC
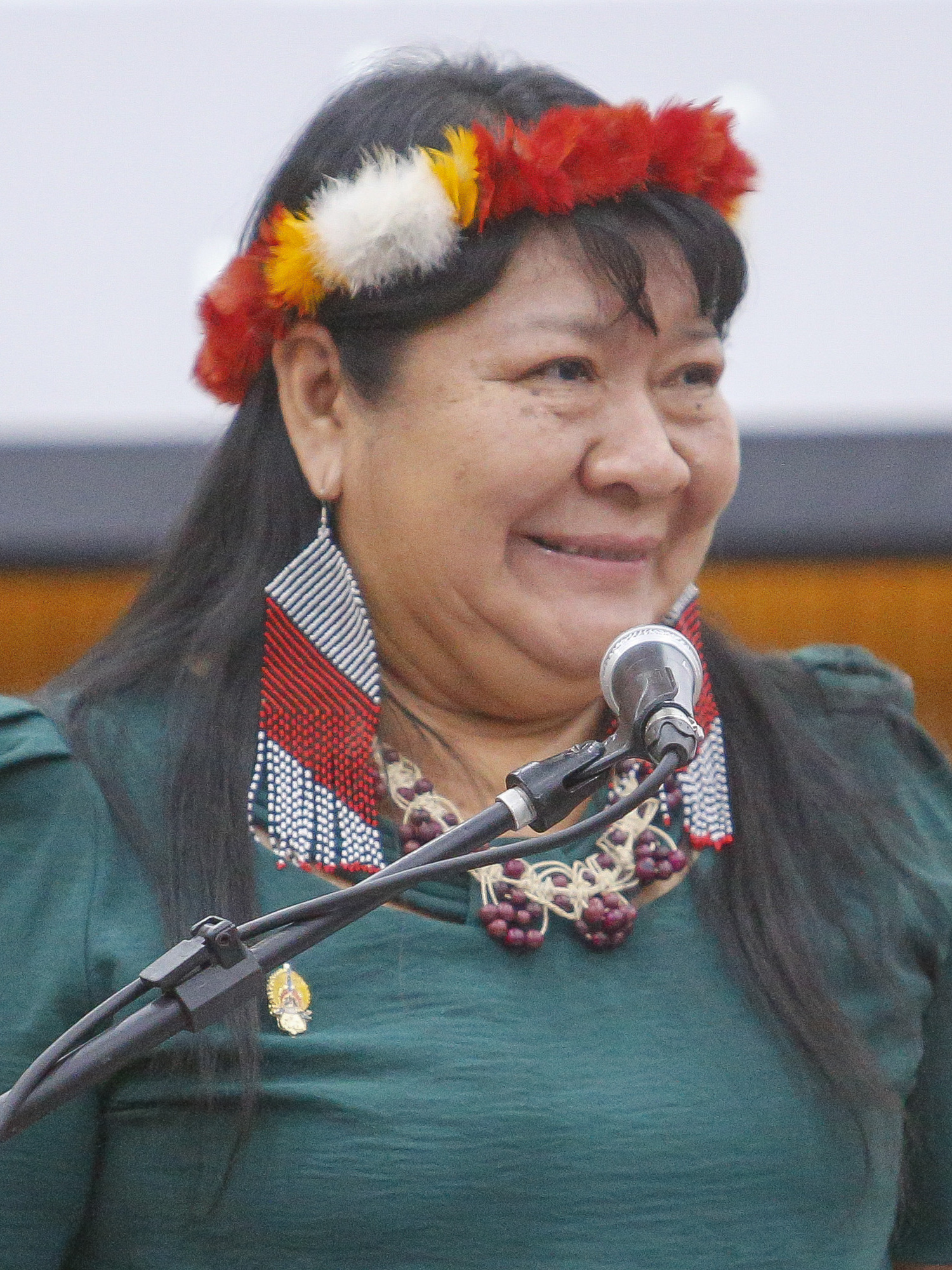
- Wapichana in 2023

Chair of the National Indigenous People Foundation
- Incumbent
- Assumed office 2 January 2023
- President: Luiz Inácio Lula da Silva
- Minister: Sônia Guajajara
- Preceded by: Marcelo Xavier

Member of the Chamber of Deputies
- In office 1 February 2019 – 2 January 2023
- Constituency: Roraima

Personal details
- Born: Joenia Batista de Carvalho; 20 April 1974 (age 52) Boa Vista, Roraima, Brazil
- Party: PT (2026-present) REDE (2017–2026)
- Education: Federal University of Roraima (LL.B.); University of Arizona (LL.M.)
- Occupation: Politician, attorney
- Known for: First Indigenous attorney in Brazil, first Indigenous attorney to argue before the Brazilian Supreme Court, and first Indigenous woman deputy elected to Brazilian National Congress

Joenia Wapichana (born Joenia Batista de Carvalho; born 20 April 1974) is the first Indigenous lawyer in Brazil and a member of the Wapichana tribe of northern Brazil. After taking a land dispute to the Inter-American Commission on Human Rights, Wapichana became the first Indigenous lawyer to argue before the Supreme Court of Brazil. She is the current president of the National Commission for the Defense of the Rights of Indigenous Peoples.

She was elected federal deputy for the state of Roraima, from the party list of the Sustainability Network (REDE), in the 2018 general election. Batista de Carvalho is the first Indigenous woman elected to the Chamber of Deputies and the second Indigenous federal deputy since the election of Mário Juruna in 1982.

After Luiz Inácio Lula da Silva took office as President of Brazil, she became the president of FUNAI and also the first Indigenous woman to assume the role.

== Early life ==
Joenia Wapichana is a member of the Wapichana people. She was born in the Brazilian state of Roraima and grew up in isolated Amazonian villages, where traditional ways of life flourished and few of the elders spoke Portuguese. When her parents were brought from their village to register their births and those of their children, a clerk chose the official name Joenia Batista de Carvalho for her identification papers. She identifies herself by her first name and her tribal affiliation as Joenia Wapichana. By the time she was seven or eight, Joenia's father had left the family and her mother moved to the state capital, Boa Vista, seeking economic opportunities. The children were enrolled in school, though three older brothers dropped out to go to work. Joenia completed her high school education in the early 1990s and initially considered becoming a doctor, as she was uninterested in the usual avenue for educated Indigenous women, teaching. She enrolled in law school, working nights in an accounting office to pay her way through school. In 1997, Joenia graduated from the Federal University of Roraima (UFRR) as the first Indigenous lawyer in Brazil.

== Career ==
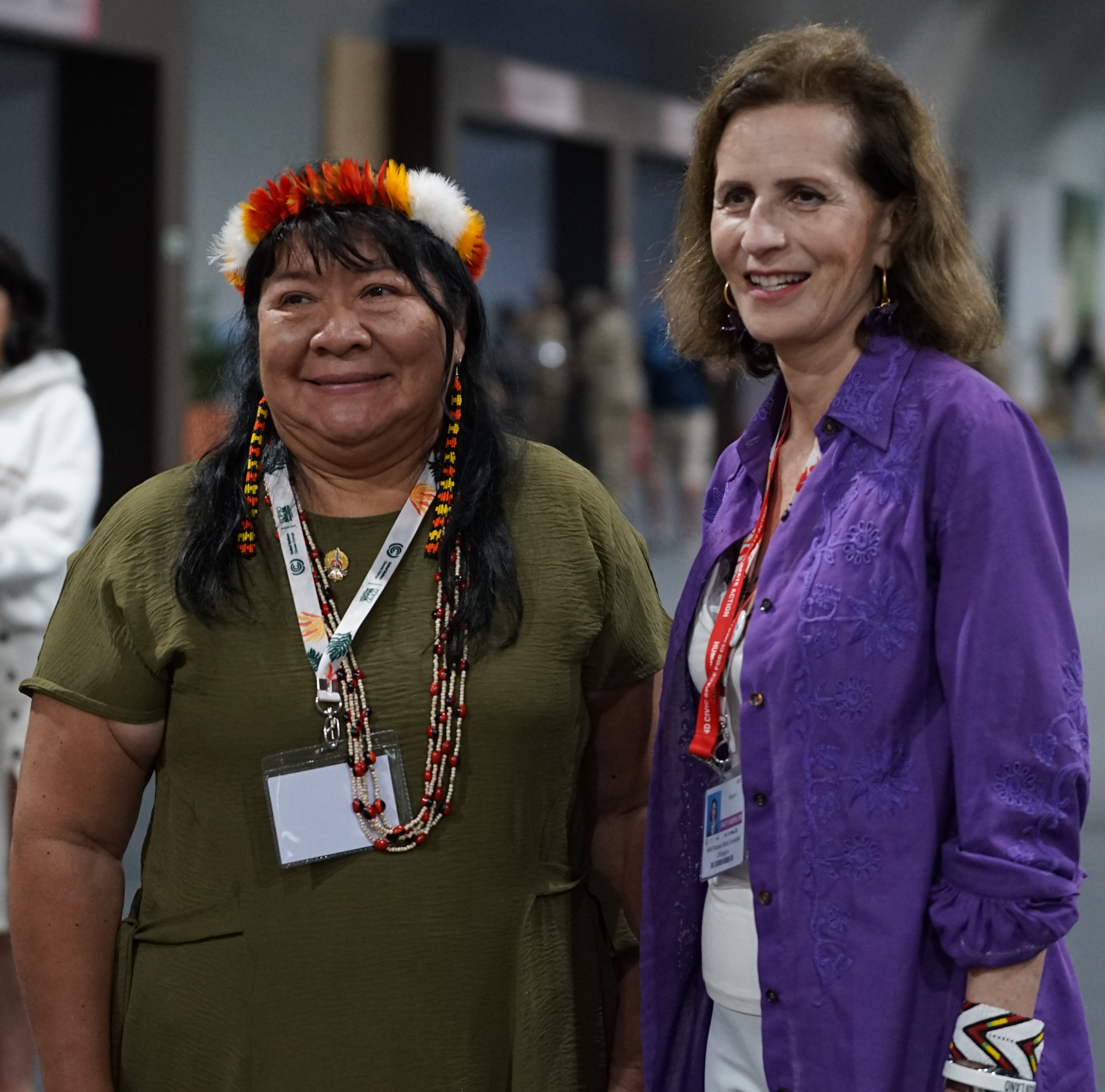
Wapichana and Princess Marie-Esméralda of Belgium at COP30 (2025)

Batista de Carvalho began working in the legal department of the Indigenous Council of Roraima (CIR). In 2004, she filed an action with the Inter-American Commission on Human Rights, asking them to compel the Brazilian government to officially set out the boundaries of the Indigenous Territory of the Raposa Serra do Sol, which are the traditional homelands of the Ingarikó, Makuxi, Patamona, Taurepang, and Wapichana peoples. In 2005, the Supreme Court of Brazil (STF) ratified the boundaries of the reserve and declared it an environmental conservation area in which Native rights were constitutionally protected, but altercations between loggers, miners and the Native communities continued. In 2008, Batista de Carvalho became the first aboriginal lawyer to argue before the STF. The case concerned whether the government had the right to divide the lands of the Raposa Serra do Sol into fragmented areas to support claims to the land by prospectors and rice producers. Batista de Carvalho argued that the constitution forbade such divisions and would be a violation of the protections in the constitution for Indigenous rights. On 19 March 2009, the STF, in a vote of ten to one, confirmed the exclusive right of the Indians to occupy and use the reserve lands of Raposa Serra do Sol.

In 2013, she was appointed as the first president of the recently created National Commission for the Defense of the Rights of Indigenous Peoples. The post was created by the Order of Attorneys of Brazil as a means of monitoring legislation which might impact Native rights. The role of the commission is to support and intervene if need be in legal matters of the lower courts or Supreme Court in cases which impact Indigenous rights.

== Awards and recognition ==
Batista de Carvalho received the Reebok Human Rights Award in 2004 and in 2010 was honored with the Ordem do Mérito Cultural by the Brazilian government. In 2018, she was awarded the United Nations Prize in the Field of Human Rights.

Chamber of Deputies (Brazil)
| Preceded by João Derly | Chamber REDE Representative; 2019–2022 | Succeeded by Túlio Gadêlha |
Government offices
| Preceded by Marcelo Xavier | Chair of the National Indigenous People Foundation; 2023–present | Incumbent |
