= Synactive Theory of Newborn Behavioral Organization and Development =

The Synactive Theory of Newborn Behavioral Organization and Development (Synaction n., or Synactive adj. [from the Greek syn “together” and the Latin actio “action,” resulting in: “together in action”]) suggests that development of the human fetus, and later newborn, proceeds through the constant balancing of approach and avoidance behaviors, leading to: (1) a continuous interaction of the subsystems (i.e., Autonomic, Motor, State and Attention/Interaction, and Regulatory) and their increasingly defined delineations within the organism (the infant) and (2) the organism's interaction with the environment at large. This process is aimed at bringing about the increasingly well-defined species-unique developmental agenda.

== Description ==

The model provides a graphic representation of the Synactive Theory of development, as applied to both fetal and newborn stages. It focuses upon the infant's within-organism, four subsystems of functioning, and their continuous interaction with each other and with the environment across time (i.e., “together in action,” or synaction). The four subsystems include the:

Autonomic Subsystem: Expressed in the pattern of respiration (e.g., fast, slow, pauses) color changes (e.g., pink, pale, red), neurological indicators (e.g., seizures, tremulousness), and visceral or gut signals such as bowel movements, gagging, and hiccuping;

Motor Subsystem: Observable through the tone, posture and movement patterns of the infant;

State and Attention/Interaction Subsystem: Expressed via: 1) the range of states available to the infant (i.e., deep sleep, light sleep, drowsy, alert, hyperalert, and cry), 2) how clearly it is to observably differentiate one state from the other, and 3) the patterns of transitions from one state to another (e.g., smooth well-differentiated state transitions versus abrupt unorganized state transitions).

The attention/interaction system is set within this state continuum (i.e., from deep sleep to cry) and represented by the infant's ability to adjust the robustness and increasing refinement of an alert, attentive state. The infant uses this state to take in cognitive and social information from the environment as well as to bring forth and modify inputs from the surrounding world; and

Regulatory Subsystem: Behaviorally represented via the observable strategies the infant uses (Self-Regulation) in maintaining a balanced, relatively stable and relaxed state of subsystem of functioning or in returning to this a state of subsystem functioning if imbalance, or stress has occurred within the subsystems.

The Synactive Theory is the foundation of both: 1) the Assessment of Preterm Infants’ Behavior (APIB), a standardized comprehensive newborn test, and 2) the Newborn Individualized Developmental Care and Assessment Program (NIDCAP), which is the care and intervention approach, that focuses on each infant's behavioral cues (e.g., hand(s) to mouth, bracing with feet against a supporting surface) in order to support the infant's strengths and reduce the infant's vulnerabilities. The infant's family is viewed as the infant's most important nurturer and is integrated in all care from the infant's birth on throughout the infant's hospitalization.
