= Ministry of Native People (Brazil) =

Brazilian government ministry

Ministry of Indigenous Peoples
- Portuguese: Ministério dos Povos Indígenas

Agency overview
- Formed: 1 January 2023; 3 years ago
- Type: Ministry
- Jurisdiction: Federal government of Brazil
- Headquarters: Esplanada dos Ministérios Brasília, Federal District
- Annual budget: $640 m BRL (2023)
- Agency executives: Sônia Guajajara, Minister; Eloy Terena, Executive-Secretary; Eunice Kerexu, Secretary of Indigenous Environmental and Territorial Rights; Ceiça Pitaguary, Secretary of Indigenous Environmental and Territorial Management; Juma Xipaia, Secretary of Articulation and Promotion of Indigenous Rights
- Website: www.gov.br/povosindigenas/

The Ministry of Indigenous Peoples (Portuguese: Ministério dos Povos Indígenas, MPI) is a cabinet-level federal ministry in Brazil. The ministry was established on 11 January 2023 under the government of Luiz Inácio Lula da Silva to advance and protect the interests of the Indigenous people of Brazil.

== History ==
Prior to the establishment of the ministry, the National Commission for Indigenous Policy (CNPI) was established in 2006 by presidential decree within the Ministry of Justice and Public Security as the first federal forum for consultative discussion of indigenous affairs. The commission was renamed as the National Council for Indigenous Policy in 2016 and imbued with deliberative powers prior to the Impeachment and removal of Dilma Rousseff.

== Structure ==
The priorities and structure of the Ministry are being elaborated in the Thematic Group of Indigenous People created during the transition, that contains, within its objectives, the nullification of the measures adopted by the Bolsonaro Government relative to the demarcation and use of indigenous territories. The relationship between the new ministry, FUNAI and the Special Secretariat for Indigenous Health (SESAI), a division of the Ministry of Health, is yet to be established.

=== Departments and Secretariats ===
- Department of Mediation and Conciliation of Indigenous Conflicts
- Secretariat for Indigenous Environmental and Territorial Rights
  - Department of Territorial Demarcation
  - Department of Territorial Protection and Isolated and Recently Contacted Indigenous Peoples
- Secretariat of Environmental and Indigenous Territorial Management
  - Department of Environmental, Territorial Management and Promotion of Good Living
  - Department of Climate Justice
- Secretariat for Articulation and Promotion of Indigenous Rights
  - Department of Promotion of Indigenous Policy
  - Department of Indigenous Languages and Memories

=== Collegiate bodies ===
- National Council for Indigenous Policy (CNPI)

=== Related bodies ===
- FUNAI
- Special Secretariat for Indigenous Health (SESAI)

== Leadership ==
The current federal deputy Sônia Guajajara was announced, in late December, as the head of the agency.

No.	Portrait	Minister	Took office	Left office	Time in office	Party	President
1	Sônia Guajajara	Sônia Guajajara (born 1974)	1 January 2023	Incumbent	3 years, 302 days	PSOL	Luiz Inácio Lula da Silva (PT)

=== Current composition ===
Public office	Name	Profession and/or academic background	Ethnicity	References
Minister of State	Sônia Guajajara	nurse and federal deputy	Guajajara	
Executive Secretary	Eloy Terena	lawyer with a postdoctoral degree in anthropology	Terena	
Secretary of Indigenous Environmental and Territorial Rights	Kerexu Yxapyry	chief, teacher, environmental manager and socio-environmental activist	Guarani	
Secretary of Environmental and Indigenous Territorial Management	Ceiça Pitaguary	indigenous rights activist	Pitaguaris	
Secretary for Articulation and Promotion of Indigenous Rights	Juma Xipaia	chief, socio-environmental activist and medical student	Xipaia	
Chief of Staff	Joziléia Kaingang	Anthropologist, PhD candidate in Anthropology and activist for the rights of indigenous women	Kaingang	
President of FUNAI	Joenia Wapichana	lawyer with a master's degree in law and former federal deputy	Wapixana	

== See also ==
- Genocide of indigenous peoples in Brazil
- Fundação Nacional do Índio (FUNAI)
