= Potiraguá =

Municipality of Bahia, Brazil

Coordinates: 15°36′S 39°53′W

- Municipality
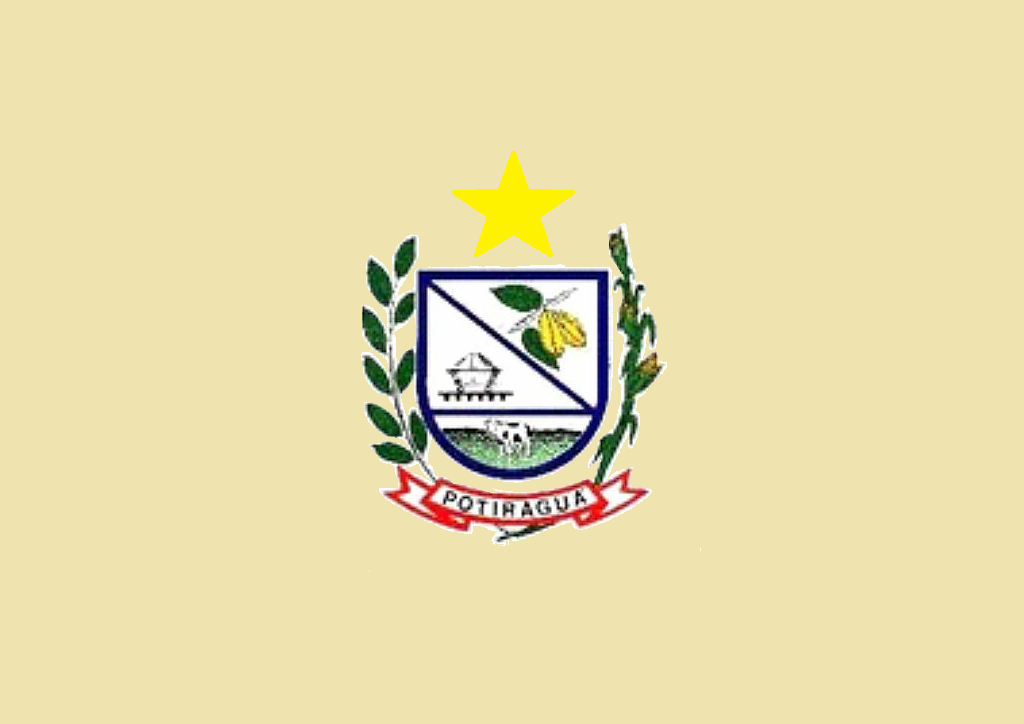
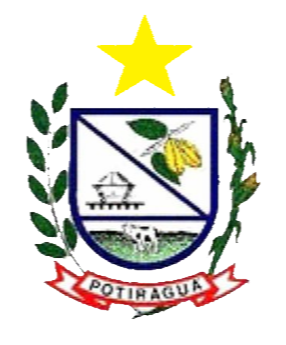
- Flag Coat of arms
- Interactive map of Potiraguá
- Country: Brazil
- Region: Nordeste
- State: Bahia

Population (2020)
  - Total: 6,916
- Time zone: UTC−3 (BRT)

Potiraguá is a municipality in the state of Bahia in the North-East region of Brazil.

== See also ==
- List of municipalities in Bahia
