= União Democrática Ruralista =

Farmers' association in Brazil

União Democrática Ruralista (UDR), known as Democratic Association of Ruralists in English, is a Brazilian right-wing association of farmers and activists from the southeast and center west who are opposed to land reform. Through its members in the Brazilian Congress, the UDR endorses landowner interests and opposes proposals in favour of an agrarian reform process.

União Democrática Ruralista opposes land reform and expropriation under its former leader, Luiz Antonio Nabhan Garcia, a Brazilian farmer who went on to have a role in the Bolsonaro government. The organization was founded in 1985, following many expropriations of land in Brazil and remains active under its Brasília based leadership. With tens of thousands of associates in all Brazilian states, UDR policy is to defend individual interests and private property.
