= Fundação Nacional dos Povos Indígenas =

Brazilian government protection agency

- FUNAI; National Indigenous People Foundation
- FUNAI Logo

Agency overview
- Formed: 5 December 1967; 58 years ago
- Preceding agency: Serviço de Proteção ao Índio (SPI)
- Headquarters: Brasília, Brazil
- Agency executive: Joênia Wapichana, President
- Parent agency: Ministry of Native People
- Website: www.gov.br/funai/pt-br

The Fundação Nacional dos Povos Indígenas (Brazilian Portuguese pronunciation: [fũdaˈsɐ̃w nasi.oˈnaw dus ˈpɔvuz ĩˈdʒiʒenɐs, - nasjoˈnaw -]; lit. 'National Indigenous People Foundation') or FUNAI is a Brazilian governmental protection agency for Amerindian interests and their culture.

== Original founding as Indian Protection Service ==
In 1910, the Indian Protection Service (Serviço de Proteção ao Índio), or the SPI, was founded under the leadership of Brazilian Marshal Candido Rondon. Rondon created the foundation's motto: "Die if necessary, but never kill." Drawing from his positivism, Rondon led the SPI with the belief that the native Indians should be allowed to develop at their own pace. With state assistance and protection, Indians would eventually integrate into modern society.

The SPI then began its mission to "pacify" Indian communities by setting up posts in their territories to foster communication and protection. Efforts were initially met by opposition and hostility from Indian groups; there were reports of SPI agents being attacked and shot by arrows.

During the 1950s and 1960s, following the death of Rondon, the SPI's officials became corrupt. In 1967, the Figueiredo Report highlighted accusations of sexual perversion, abuse, and the massacre of entire tribes by introducing diseases and pesticides, leading to an international outcry for the disbandment of SPI. Following this disbandment, FUNAI was created to take over SPI's responsibilities and remedy the damages caused by corruption.

== Early years ==
FUNAI was created by Law No. 5,371, under jurisdiction of the Ministry of Justice and headquartered in Brasilia. On 19 December 1973, Law No. 6001 officially placed Indians under the protection of FUNAI through the Indian Statute. The Indian Statute, while aiming to demarcate all Indian lands by 1978, also had the main goal to integrate Indians into society as soon as possible, so that the Amazon and its people could start contributing economically to Brazilian society.

Protection from a government agency is important for Indian populations, but this also means that FUNAI, as a part of the government, has authority to act contrary to the welfare of the Indians. For example, the Indian Statute permitted mining on indigenous lands; a decree in 1983 restricted mining to minerals necessary only for national defense and security, but still allowed private companies to have licenses and use indigenous labor if necessary.

In the early 1970s, FUNAI president General Jerônimo Bandeira de Mello approved the plan for a highway that would run through Brazil's Amazon to Peru's frontier. This highway granted access to the previously inaccessible interior of the Amazon, allowing government and private agencies to use it for their advantage. The highway led to the relocation and extermination of many indigenous tribes by the government and other private agencies, and logging along the highway directly led to deforestation along the affected parts of the Amazon. Sydney Possuelo was one of the sertanistas/explorers sent to find and relocate the tribes living along the path of the highway. Possuelo and other sertanistas were disturbed by the number of indigenous deaths their contact caused, and met in 1987 to try to stop it. Possuelo's efforts greatly influenced FUNAI's change in policy from "pacification" and integration to preservation.

== Contact with isolated tribes ==
The Central Department for Isolated Indians and Recently Contacted Indians (CGIIRC) is a division within FUNAI to handle dealings with isolated indigenous tribes. Article 231 of the 1988 Constitution expresses indigenous peoples' rights to preserve their culture, traditions, and customs; since contact with mainstream society could jeopardize isolated tribes' culture, FUNAI undertakes efforts to maintain these tribes' isolation. The CGIIRC division is responsible for protecting areas with known isolated tribes from outside contact, since outside contact could spread disease within indigenous communities. The department is present in 12 regions of Brazil's Amazon region, and almost all of Brazil's known uncontacted tribes reside within already demarcated lands. FUNAI has records of about 107 isolated Indians' presence.

== Legislation and demarcation efforts ==
The Brazilian Constitution of 1988 recognized Indians' rights to practice their customs without pressure to assimilate or integrate into mainstream Brazilian society. Article 231 also defines Indians' rights to their lands, and outlines FUNAI's responsibility to demarcate those lands. The article also provides that mining and other energy resources on indigenous lands are only allowed with the approval of Congress, and after taking into account the Indigenous populations' input. The Constitution set a goal of demarcating indigenous lands in five years, but by 1993 only 291 of 559 indigenous territories were demarcated.

In 1991, Decree 22 outlined five steps FUNAI must follow to demarcate indigenous lands:

1. FUNAI's president is responsible for establishing an anthropological team to identify the lands to be demarcated.
2. The team must then prepare a report of their findings.
3. The team must publish the report to the Diário Oficial da Uniao and submit it to the Minister of Justice, who will review the report and issue an Administrative Decree outlining the area's boundaries.
4. The FUNAI is responsible for physically demarcating the lands, checking with the Minister of Justice and the President for continuous approval.
5. Finally FUNAI registers the property with the Federal Property Departement.

In 1996, Brazil's President Cardoso passed Decree 1775, which effectively revoked Decree 22 and expanded the ways that commercial interests could contest the demarcation of lands. Individuals or companies were allowed from the beginning of the demarcation process until 90 days after FUNAI issued their report to submit an appeal showing that the contested lands do not meet the qualifications of indigenous lands as stated in the constitution. The government claimed that allowing people to contest indigenous lands during the demarcation process would prevent any future challenges of completed lands on the basis of unconstitutionality. The decree was widely contested as a violation of indigenous rights, earning the nickname of the "Genocide Decree," due to the power it gave to commercial interests to exploit Indian lands. By April 1996, FUNAI had received over 500 appeals for over 40 indigenous territories that were in the process of being demarcated. FUNAI followed procedure and submitted its official opinion to the Ministry of Justice, rejecting the appeals that were brought against the indigenous lands. Justice Nelson Jobim sided with FUNAI on all except eight territories, ordering further investigation.

One of these territories was the Raposa/Serra do Sol region in the northern state of Roraima, home to the Macuxi, Wapixanas, Ingaricós, Taurepangs and Patamonas peoples. FUNAI identified almost 1.8 million hectares of these lands to be demarcated in 1977, but opposition from farmers and mining companies in the region prevented the completion of its demarcation. After Decree 1775, the claims against the Raposa/Serra do Sol regions were backed by the Roraima state government, which supported breaking up the area into smaller settlements. Despite FUNAI's recommendations to demarcate the entire indigenous region, commercial and state pressure led Justice Nelson Jobim to order the reduction of land under Decree 1775. FUNAI, along with other indigenous rights organizations like the Indigenous Council of Roraima (CIR), Coordination of the Indigenous Organizations of the Brazilian Amazon (COIAB), and Council for the Articulation of Indigenous Peoples and Organizations in Brazil (CAPOIB) worked together in opposition to this decision. The land was finally recognized as an indigenous territory in 2005.

On 28 December 2009, President Luís Inácio (Lula) da Silva signed Presidential Decree 7056, also known as the "FUNAI Statute". The decree restructured FUNAI, effectively closing hundreds of indigenous posts and regional FUNAI offices. The government never consulted with indigenous populations, even though under Convention 169 of the International Labour Organization, the government is required to discuss legal changes that would affect indigenous populations. This led to hundreds of indigenous people, deeming themselves the Revolutionary Indigenous Camp, to protest outside the Ministry of Justice building. The protesters called for the resignation of FUNAI president Márcio Augusto Freitas de Meira and the revocation of Decree 7056. Protesters were eventually forcibly removed from their camp outside the Ministry of Justice Building, and the Decree remained in effect, decreasing the quality and efficiency FUNAI could provide to indigenous peoples.

President Luiz Inácio Lula da Silva's government approved 81 applications for demarcation, but Dilma Rousseff's government approved only 11 territories from 2011 to 2015.

== Changes under President Jair Bolsonaro ==
The former Brazilian president Jair Bolsonaro has expressed his determination to increase the economic exploitation of Brazil's resources and to increase commercial mining and farming on indigenous reserves.

Within hours of taking office in January 2019, Bolsonaro made two major changes to FUNAI: He moved FUNAI from under the Ministry of Justice to be under the newly created Ministry of Women, Family and Human Rights, and he delegated the identification of the traditional habitats of indigenous people and their designation as inviolable protected territories − a task attributed to FUNAI by the constitution – to the Agriculture Ministry. Several months later, Brazil's National Congress overturned these changes.

According to Al Jazeera, in February 2019, several indigenous organisations reported to the Inter-American Commission on Human Rights on violence exerted against indigenous communities including homicides, stonings, deforesting, threats and arson.

In July 2019, Bolsonaro appointed Marcelo Xavier da Silva, a federal police officer with strong connections to agribusiness, as the new president of the FUNAI. Silva was also nominated but not confirmed as an aide to Nabhan Garcia, a senior agriculture ministry official and president of an agribusiness lobby. According to The Guardian, former FUNAI president Gen Franklimberg de Freitas has said that Garcia "froths hate" for indigenous people and that he sees FUNAI as "an obstacle to national development".

In April 2020, FUNAI authorized the registration and sale of land on unratified or unregistered indigenous territories. This could affect 237 reserves in 24 states. However, in June 2020 the state attorney general of Mato Grosso put in a bid for annulment. He called the authorization a dereliction of FUNAI's own mission.

== Second presidency of Lula da Silva ==
In his first act of government, President Luiz Inácio Lula da Silva issued the Provisional Measure No. 1,154, of 1 January 2023, which created the Ministry of Indigenous People, and also renamed the Fundação Nacional do Índio (National Indian Foundation – FUNAI) with the name of Fundação Nacional dos Povos Indígenas (National Indigenous People Foundation), in addition to linking this foundation authority to the newly created ministry.

On the same day, Sônia Guajajara, a federal deputy elected for São Paulo in 2022, became the first indigenous woman to hold a ministerial position in the Brazilian government, when she was appointed as a minister.

== Presidents of FUNAI ==
- José de Queiroz Campos
- Oscar Jeronymo Bandeira de Mello
- Ismarth Araújo de Oliveira
- Adhemar Ribeiro da Silva
- John Carlos Nobre da Veiga
- Paulo Moreira Leal
- Otávio Ferreira Lima
- Jurandy Marcos da Fonseca
- Nelson Marabuto
- Nelson Marabuto
- Ayrton Carneiro de Almeida
- Gerson da Silva Alves
- Álvaro Villas Boas
- Apoena Meireles
- Romero Jucá
- Iris Pedro de Oliveira
- Airton Alcântara
- Cantídio Guerreiro Guimarães
- Sidney Ferreira Possuelo
- Claudio dos Santos Romero
- Dinarte Nobre Madeiro
- Márcio Santilli
- Julio Gaiger
- Sulivan Silvestre
- Márcio Lacerda
- Carlos Frederico Marés de Souza Filho
- Roque Laraia
- Glênio Alvarez
- Otacílio Antunes Reis Filho
- Arthur Noble Mendes
- Eduardo Aguiar de Almeida
- Mércio Pereira Gomes
- Márcio Meira
- Marta Maria do Amaral Azevedo
- Maria Augusta Boulitreau Assirati (interim)
- Flávio Chiarelli Vicente de Azevedo (interim)
- João Pedro Gonçalves da Costa (2015–2016)
- Artur Nobre Mendes (2016, interim)
- Agostinho do Nascimento Netto (2016–2017)
- Antonio Fernandes Toninho Costa (2017)
- Franklimberg Ribeiro de Freitas (2017–2018)
- Wallace Moreira Bastos (2018–2019)
- Franklimberg Ribeiro de Freitas (2019)
- Marcelo Xavier (2019–2022)
- Elisabete Ribeiro Alcântara Lopes (2022, interim)
- Joênia Wapichana (2023–present)

== See also ==
- Cândido Rondon
- Celso Brandão
- Figueiredo Report
- Indigenous peoples in Brazil
- Mercio Pereira Gomes
- Sydney Possuelo

== Notes ==
He was appointed president, but was prevented from taking office by a group of indigenous people and officials who formed a barrier at the entrance to the building.

== Bibliography ==
- (in French) Michel Braudeau, « Le télégraphe positiviste de Cândido Rondon », in Le rêve amazonien, éditions Gallimard, 2004 (ISBN 2-07-077049-4).
