= Sônia Guajajara =

Brazilian indigenous activist and politician (born 1974)

Sônia Guajajara OMC
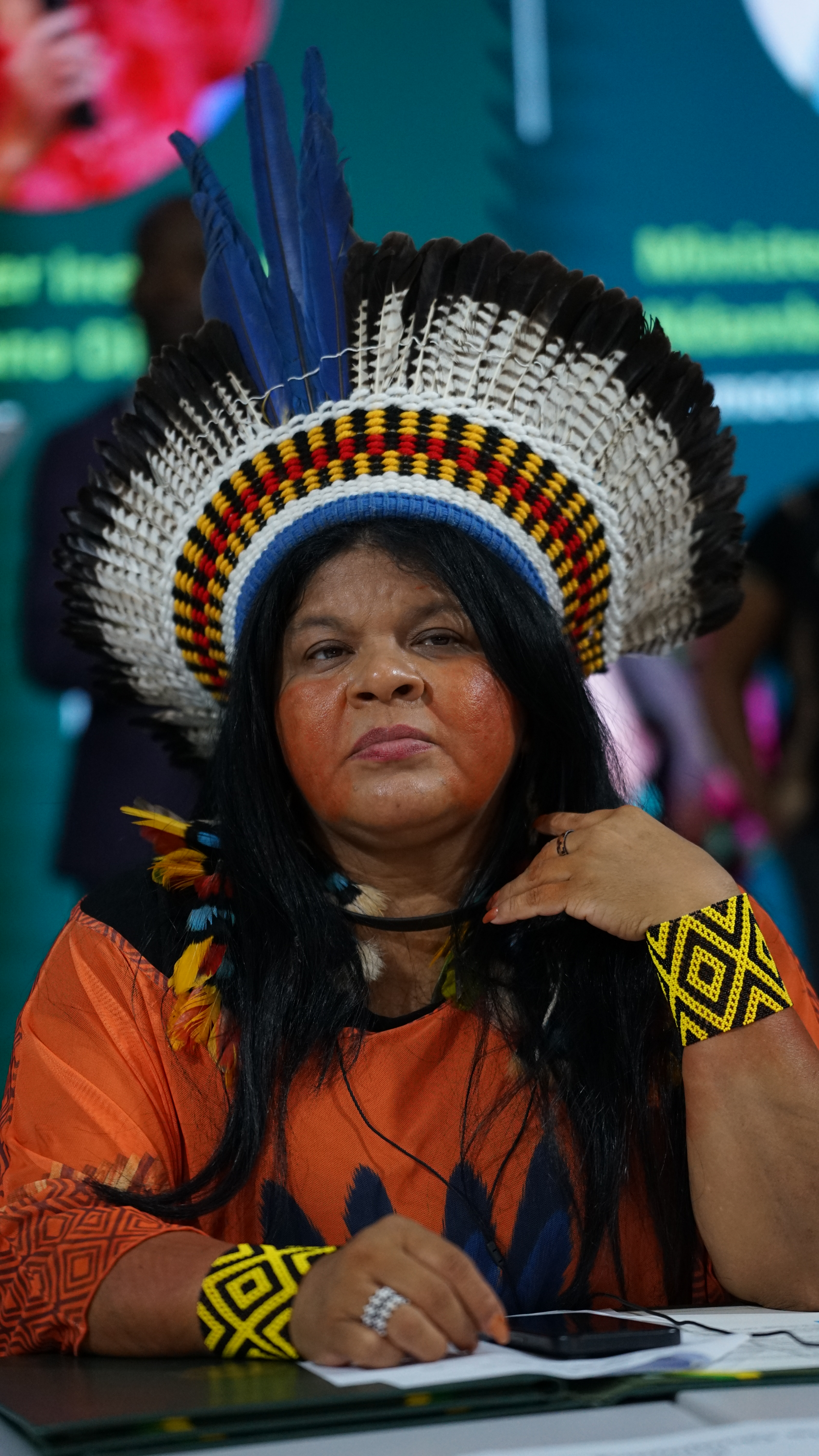
- Guajajara at COP30 in 2025

Member of the Chamber of Deputies
- Incumbent
- Assumed office 1 February 2023 (Note: On leave from February 1, 2023, to March 31, 2026, to take on the role of Minister of Indigenous Peoples. Reelected in the 2026 elections for another term starting in 2027.)
- Constituency: São Paulo

Minister of Indigenous Peoples
- In office 1 January 2023 – 1 April 2026
- President: Luiz Inácio Lula da Silva
- Preceded by: Office established
- Succeeded by: Eloy Terena

Personal details
- Born: Sônia Bone de Souza Silva Santos; 6 March 1974 (age 52) Araribóia Indigenous Land, Maranhão, Brazil
- Party: PSOL (2011–present)
- Other political affiliations: PT (2000–2011)
- Education: State University of Maranhão (BLitt, BSN)

Sônia Bone de Souza Silva Santos (born 6 March 1974), usually known as Sônia Guajajara, is a Brazilian indigenous Guajajara activist, environmentalist, nurse and politician. A member of the Socialism and Liberty Party (PSOL), she was initially a candidate for President of Brazil in the 2018 Brazilian general election, before being chosen as the vice presidential running mate of nominee Guilherme Boulos. This made her the first indigenous person to run for a federal executive position in Brazil. From 2023 to her resignation in 2026, she served as the inaugural Minister of Indigenous Peoples in the Second cabinet of Lula da Silva. In 2022, Guajajara was named one of the 100 most influential people in the world by Time.

== Early life ==
Sônia Guajajara was born to a Guajajara family on Araribóia Indigenous Land (Portuguese: Terra Indígena Araribóia), located in the Amazonian rainforest in the northeastern state of Maranhão. At the age of 15, she left home at the invitation of FUNAI and moved to Minas Gerais, where she completed her initial education at an agricultural boarding school.

Guajajara became interested in politics at a very young age, and stated, "I was born an activist. I’ve spent my whole life fighting against anonymity, against indigenous peoples’ invisibility. I always wanted to find a path, a way to bring the history and way of life of the indigenous people to light for society as a whole."

Guajajara would later attend the Federal University of Maranhão, located in the state capital of São Luís. Guajajara additionally holds a master’s degree in culture and society from the Institute of Humanities, Arts, and Culture at the Federal University of Bahia. Following graduation, Guajajara worked in a variety of professions, including as a teacher and as a nurse.

== Activism and honors ==
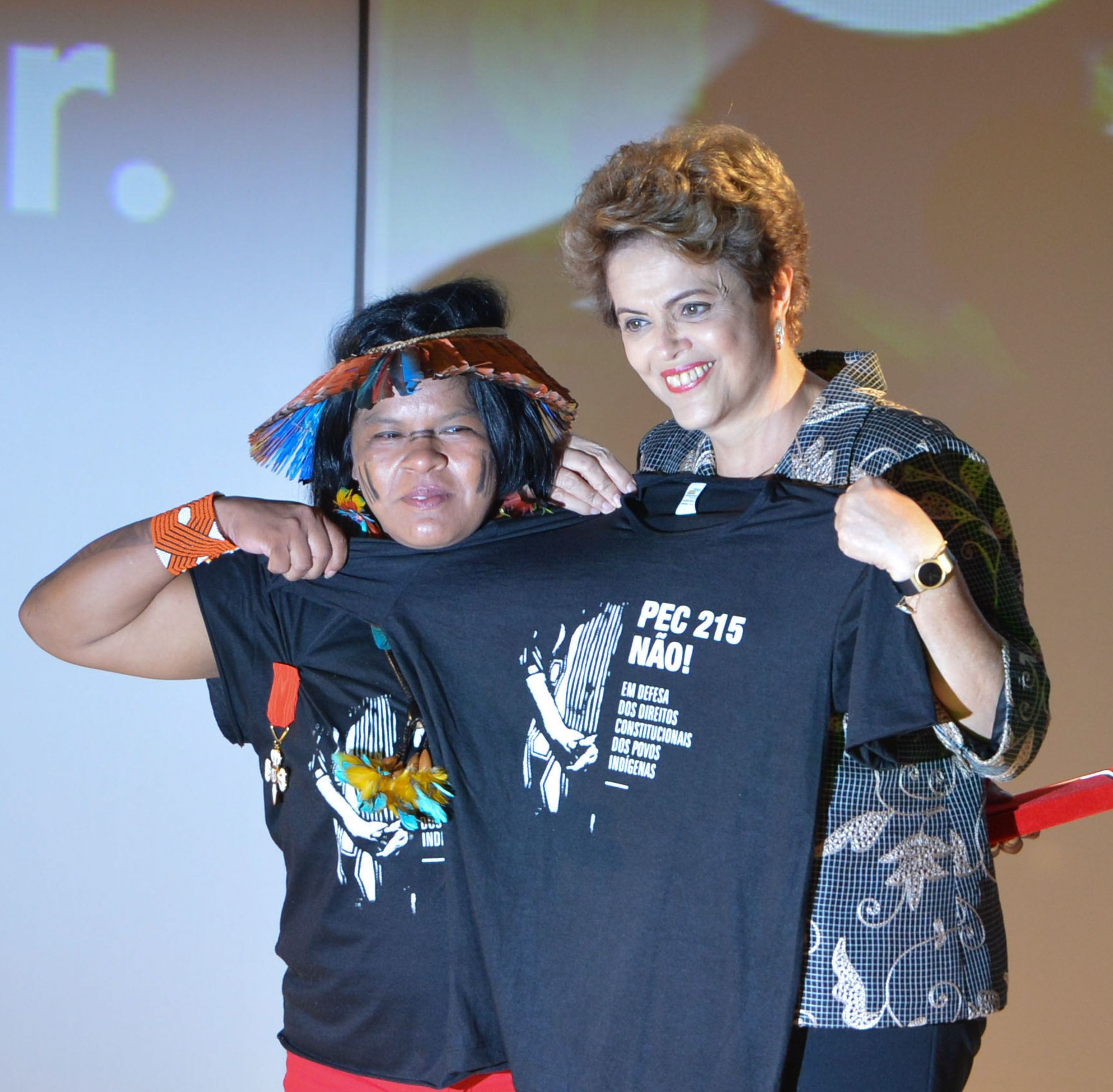
Guajajara with President Dilma Rousseff in 2015.

Guajajara is the leader of the Articulação dos Povos Indígenas do Brasil (Articulation of the Indigenous Peoples of Brazil, or "APIB"), an organization that represents around 300 indigenous ethnic groups in Brazil.

As an activist, she has been at odds with the ruralistas in the National Congress, a group of conservative legislators allied with agribusiness interests who favor further development on public lands.

Guajajara strongly opposes efforts to contact uncontacted peoples in the Amazon Rainforest. Guajajara has described President Jair Bolsonaro as "a threat to the planet" due to his deforestation policies. In 2020, she called for urgent environmental action amid the COVID-19 pandemic.

During her time as an activist, she has organized a number of demonstrations in support of indigenous rights in Brazil, and facilitated a meeting of indigenous leaders with then-President Dilma Rousseff in 2013. In 2015, she was named to the Brazilian Ordem do Mérito Cultural. She was also awarded a medal by Maranhão state.

In March 2022 she was amongst 151 international feminists signing Feminist Resistance Against War: A Manifesto, in solidarity with the Russian Feminist Anti-War Resistance. (Note: This manifesto was criticized by both Ukrainian feminists and members of the Feminist Anti-War Resistance themselves.)

== Political career ==
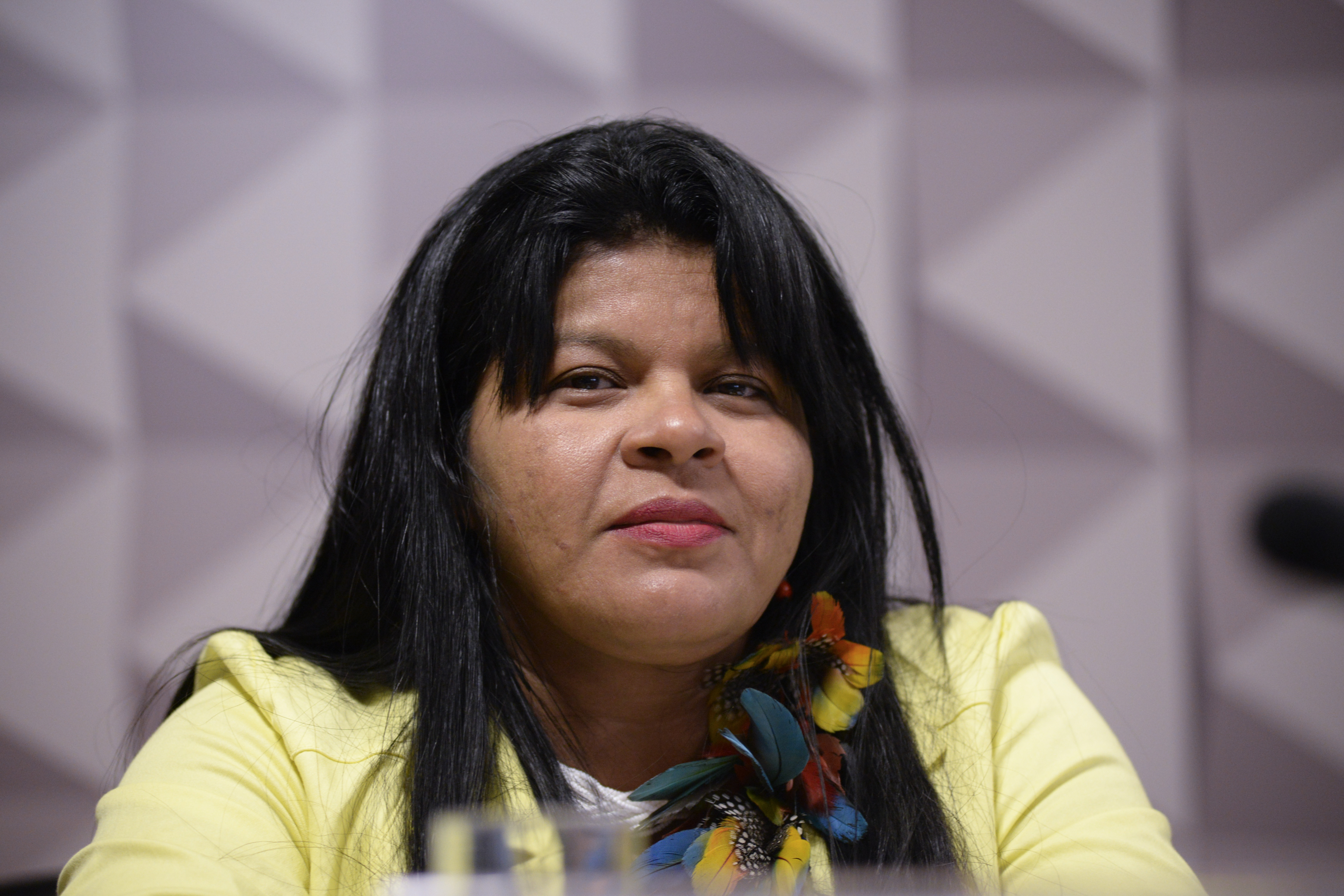
Guajajara at a public hearing for a proposed reorganization of Rio Novo National Park.

=== Party politics ===
Guajajara became a member of the Workers' Party (PT), the left-wing party that ruled Brazil from 2003 to 2016, in 2000. In 2011, Guajajara left the party due to its alliance with Roseana Sarney, a conservative politician who served as Governor of her home state of Maranhão. She later joined the Socialism and Liberty Party (PSOL), a socialist party initially founded by PT dissidents.

In the run-up to the 2014 presidential election, Guajajara criticized the presidency of Dilma Rousseff in an interview, stating that the "Dilma government was very bad for us". In the same interview, she also cautioned against the election of a right-wing Brazilian Social Democracy Party (PSDB) to the presidency. Despite her misgivings, Guajajara denounced the impeachment of Dilma Rousseff that led to the installation of Michel Temer as President, describing it as a "coup".

=== 2018 presidential election ===
In 2018, Guajajara announced her intention to run for President of Brazil as a member of PSOL. Her candidacy was backed by the support of the ecosocialist wing of the party. In the end, she was chosen by labor leader Guilherme Boulos to serve as his vice presidential running mate on the PSOL ticket. Guajajara was the first indigenous person to run for a federal executive office in Brazil.

=== 2022 Chamber of Deputies election ===
Guajajara was confirmed as a pre-candidate for federal deputy in the 2022 Brazilian general election. She was elected with 156,966 votes. In January 2023, President Luiz Inácio Lula da Silva appointed Guajajara to lead the Ministry of Indigenous Peoples. She was sworn in on 11 January 2023.

=== COP30 ===
At the U.N. climate summit held in Brazil in 2025, Guajajara helped to ensure that about 400 Indigenous representatives were able to participate in the official Blue Zone where negotiations were conducted and plenary sessions, among other events, were held, and thousands more from all over the world were present in other areas.

=== 2026 Chamber of Deputies election ===
Guajajara resigned on 1 April 2026 to run for the Chamber of Deputies in the 2026 Brazilian general election. She was succeeded as Minister by Eloy Terena.

== Awards ==
In November 2023, Guajajara was named to the BBC's 100 Women list, which features 100 inspiring and influential women from around the world.

== Notes ==
Political offices
Office created	Minister of Indigenous People; 2023–present	Incumbent
Party political offices
Preceded by Jorge Paz	PSOL nominee for Vice President of Brazil; 2018	Most recent
