= History of Roraima =

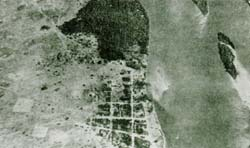
Aerial view of Boa Vista in 1924, by the explorer Hamilton Rice.

The history of the territory that is now Roraima, a state at the extreme north of present-day Brazil is recent, but not thereby simple. Invaded numerous times by the various countries interested in the region, the seldom-visited Roraima aroused little interest on the part of the Portuguese, especially after the arrival of the royal family in Rio de Janeiro. Meanwhile, the territory became coveted by other countries, including England, the Netherlands, and, especially, Spain.

A stage for revolts, massacres, exploration, and development, there were numerous foreign invasions, each repelled by the Portuguese force at Forte São Joaquim. Joaquim Nabuco, the acclaimed Pernambucan lawyer, defended the region from the king of Italy in the 19th century. The territory which was a municipality became a federal territory and a state.

== The 17th century: the discovery of the Branco River ==
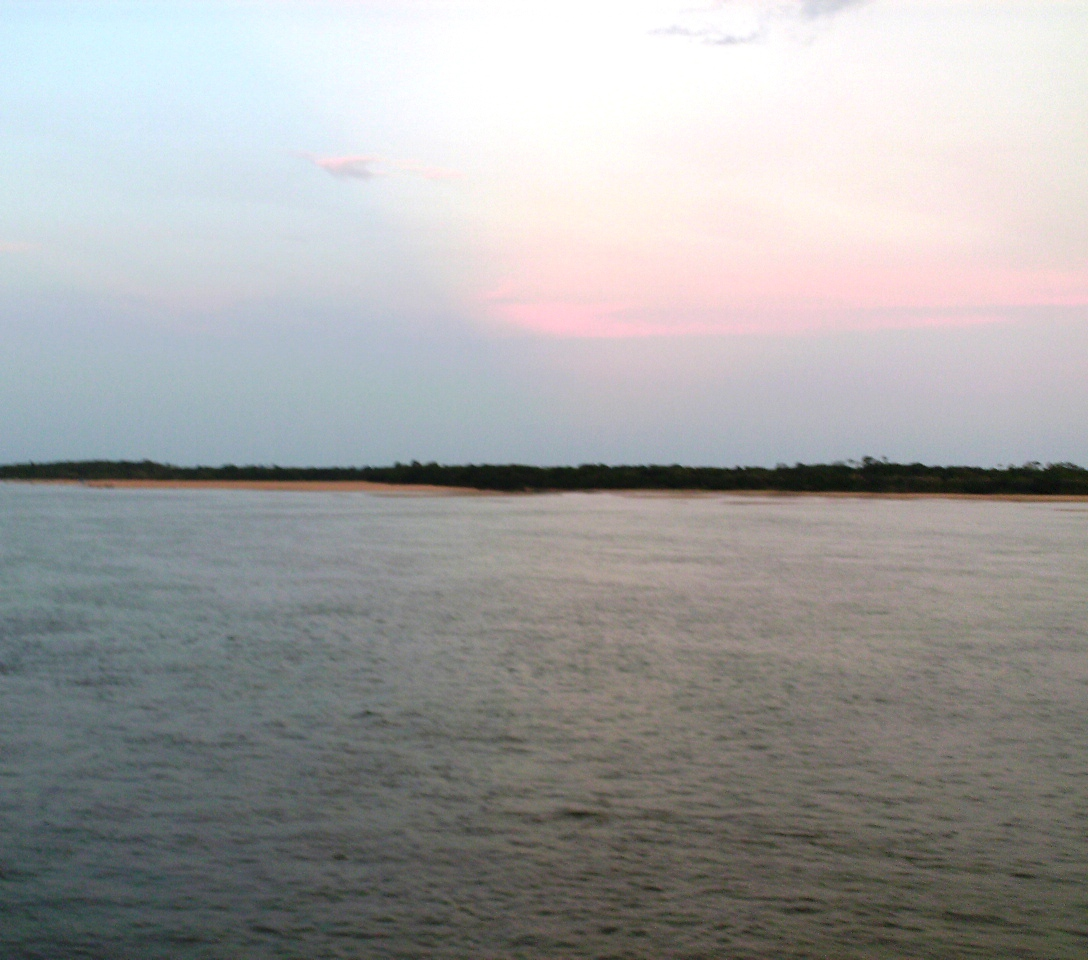
The Branco River, the largest and most important river in the region.

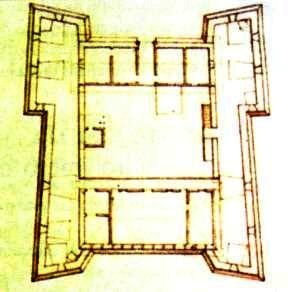
Plan of Forte São Joaquim.

Although the Portuguese arrived in Brazil in 1500 under Pedro Álvares Cabral, two hundred years passed before they discovered the Branco River valley. It was by this river, which is the principal watercourse in the area, that the first Portuguese colonizers arrived.

Although the area was inhabited by native people, the first Europeans' stay there was not calm, as Spain launched invasions from Venezuela, and the Netherlands from Suriname. The Portuguese reacted by defeating and expelling the invaders, and establishing Portuguese sovereignty in the region.

Captain Francisco Ferreira and the Carmelite priest Jerônimo Coelho were the first colonizers to arrive at the Branco River. Their intentions were to imprison natives and collect turtle eggs.

Later, Cristóvão Aires Botelho and Lourenço Belfort arrived, being the first to cross the Cachoeira do Bem-Querer. José Miguel Aires also came up the Branco, with the goal of imprisoning indigenous people and selling them at Belém do Pará and São Luís do Maranhão, where they would become slaves.

In November 1739, Nicholas Horstman, a German surgeon commissioned by the Dutch Governor of Guiana, traveled up the Essequibo River accompanied by two Dutch soldiers and four Indian guides. In April 1741 one of the Indian guides returned reporting that in 1740 Horstman had crossed over to the Rio Branco and descended it to its confluence with the Rio Negro. Horstman discovered Lake Amucu on the North Rupununi and later settled in Belém.

The Spanish, on their part, invaded the Uraricoera River Valley between the years 1771 and 1773, having crossed the cordillera of Pacaraima. There they founded three settlements, Santa Bárbara, São João Batista de Caya Caya, and Santa Rosa. However, they could not resist the Portuguese and were eventually expelled from the region. Seeing the international interest in the region, the colonial government constructed the Forte de São Joaquim do Rio Branco (now disappeared), a mark of Portuguese hegemony in the area.

The construction of the fort brought an illusion of having achieved prosperity, with the construction of three villages where the natives were forced to live: Nossa Senhora da Conceição e Santo Antônio, on the banks of the Uraricoera, São Felipe on the Takutu River, and Nossa Senhora do Carmo e Santa Bárbara on the Rio Branco. They were not successful, as the natives rebelled against the Portuguese impositions, and abandoned the villages which later disappeared.

== The 18th century: introduction of cattle ==
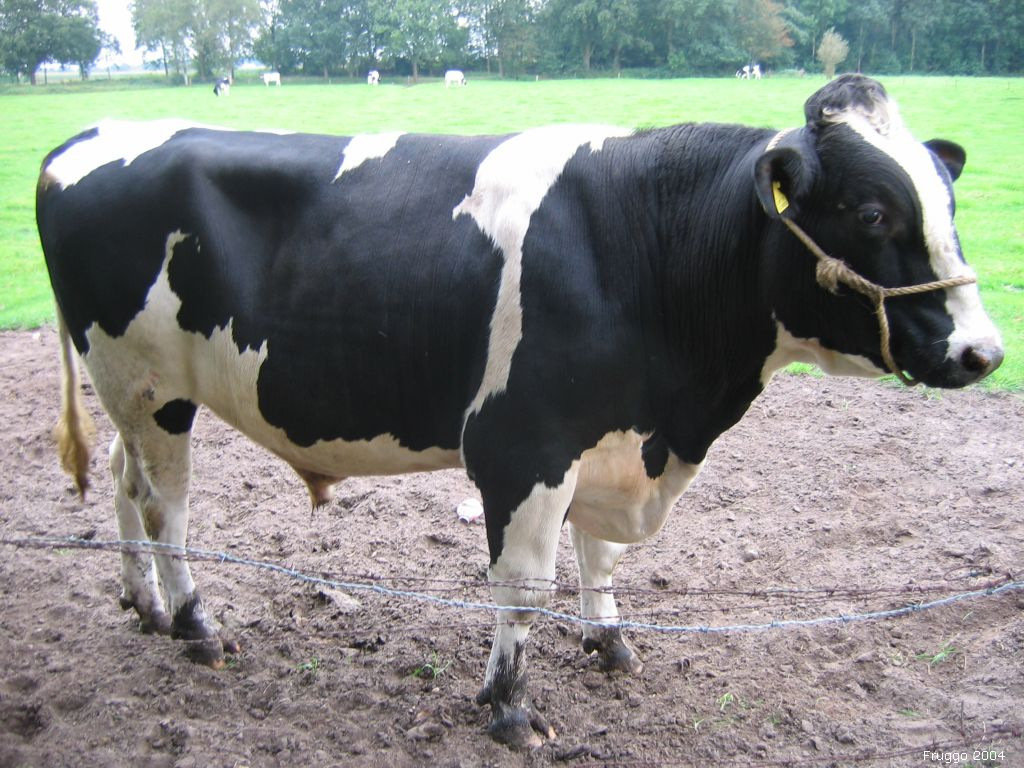
The cow was, along with the horse, the first livestock in the region.

The end of the 18th century marked the beginning of an economy based on cattle husbandry. Manuel da Gama Lobo D'Almada was the pioneer who, in 1789, introduced cattle and horses to the region, which the intention of spreading his familiar civilization to this new place.

In 1770, there was an indigenous revolt in Roraima known as the Bloody Beach Revolt (Revolta da praia de sangue). The name comes from the fact that many soldiers and native people were killed and their blood tinted the waters of the Branco River.

The livestock industry began at the São Bento ranch, then later was concentrated at São José, and finally in 1799 established itself definitively at Fazenda São Marcos, which is now located within the boundaries of the indigenous areas stipulated by FUNAI.

There were no fences, walls, or other enclosures to delimit the edges of the grazing areas, allowing the animals to disperse throughout the region. Some took advantage of this by claiming stray cattle and starting their own ranches. Some of the native people became well established as ranchers, in particular the Macushi, who remain known for it today.

== The 19th century: the royal family and economic stagnation ==
In 1808 the Portuguese moved to Brazil, fleeing Napoleon Bonaparte and the French army. Established in the colonial capital, Rio de Janeiro, the nobility confronted problems adapting to their new home. They wished to establish the comfort and luxurious way of life they were accustomed to in Europe, which caused to the southern part of the colony to develop, while the Amazon found itself abandoned.

At the time of this abandonment, Forte São Joaquim, was maintained for over a century as a sentinel of Portuguese sovereignty in the region. During this time, there were various confrontations between Portuguese soldiers and foreign invaders. This is a list of the leaders of the fort from this period:

1. Captain Nicolau de Sá Sarmento (1787)
2. Captain Inácio Magalhães (1830)
3. Captain Ambrósio Aires (1835)
4. Captain José Barros Leal (1839)
5. Major Coelho (1842)
6. Captain Bento Brasil (1852)
7. General Pedro Rodrigues (1899)

=== The question of Pirara ===
Map with the areas contested by the English. Not drawn to scale.

Among the most powerful armies to challenge Portuguese dominance in the Branco river valley were the English. The dispute between the English and Portuguese in parts of the Brazilian territory went beyond military invasions to international diplomacy and advocateship, and lasted many years without arriving at a definite resolution.

Between 1810 and 1811 English soldiers penetrated the region. The commander of the fort received them cordially, but preventing them from completing their mission. The German Robert Hermann Schomburgk, who worked for the English, visited the area in 1835, under the pretense of researching the physical geography of the interior of Guyana. He sent to London reports denouncing the almost nonexistent Portuguese control of the area that is the present-day state of Roraima, and suggested that England occupy certain areas, in some cases permanently.

The English court and public opinion received the report well and the Protestant missionary Thomas Yound was sent to the area. Yound arrived in the area of Pirara converting the natives to Protestantism and encouraging British allegiance, teaching English and raising the British flag.

The president of the province of Pará, General Francisco José de Sousa Soares de Andréa, ordered the commander of the fort, Ambrósio Aires, and the friar José Santos Inocentes to command the missionary personally to leave the region. He, for his part, followed the command, but took with him natives that had already been converted.

The attempt of the English to dominate the region did not end there, and in 1840 a large conflict developed which involved even the European kings and international tribunals. On this date, Schomburgk drew a map with contained the regions of Tacutu, Mau and Surumu, showing that they were occupied by "independent tribes," and sent it to London. It gave a new border between the Brazilian lands and the present-day territory of Guyana, given as the Cotingo and Surumu Rivers.

The map impressed British public opinion, which supported complying with Schomburgk's suggestions of occupying the territory. The Brazilian presence in the border region was weak due to disunity in the royal family; nevertheless, the government in Para protested before the English consulate in Belém, and the Brazilian government protested at the Brazilian embassy in London. The protests made the British government retreat to the provisional boundaries already established in the region, but did not desist in its claims. In 1842, a Brazilian recommendation was received in London that the disputed area (called "Rupununi") be "neutralized."

Britain agreed, but did not renounce its rights: it accepted neutralization only on the condition of the inclusion of the areas of the Cotindo and Mau rivers. This diplomatic impasse lasted until 1898, when Brazil agreed with Britain that the issue be submitted to the Italian government, who would serve as an arbiter for the dispute. The Pernambucan Joaquim Nabuco argued the Brazilian case, which would be heard by Victor Emmanuel III of Italy. Nabuco studied the case, arguing for the precedence of Portuguese supremacy in the area. Eighteen volumes of arguments were advanced in the Portuguese case.

In 1904 a decision was made by the Italian king: 19,630 square kilometers would be taken from Brazil and given to Britain, which today form the territory of the nation of Guyana, defining the boundaries of the countries. Despite this, the arguments of Nabuco were not in vain, considering that without them the territory lost would have been about double, giving Roraima an eternal debt to his argumentative skill.

=== The birth of Boa Vista ===
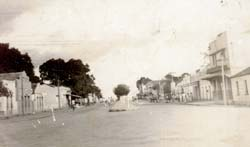
View of Boa Vista: Avenida Jaime Brasil in 1924.

According to the data from 1887, the population of Boa Vista was 1,000 inhabitants, counting only whites and slaves, and not the indigenous population. On July 9, 1890 the governor of Amazonas Augusto Ximeno de Ville Roy created the municipality of Boa Vista do Rio Branco (today simply Boa Vista), believing that in this way he was creating an incentive for developing the Branco valley region.

Another attitude which contributed to the development of the region was the construction of a road linking Boa Vista and Manaus, which today is one of the primary highways of the area, the BR-174. The order for construction was given by the Amazonas governor, Eduardo Ribeiro and was executed by the resident Sebastião Diniz.

== The 20th century: creation of the federal territory ==
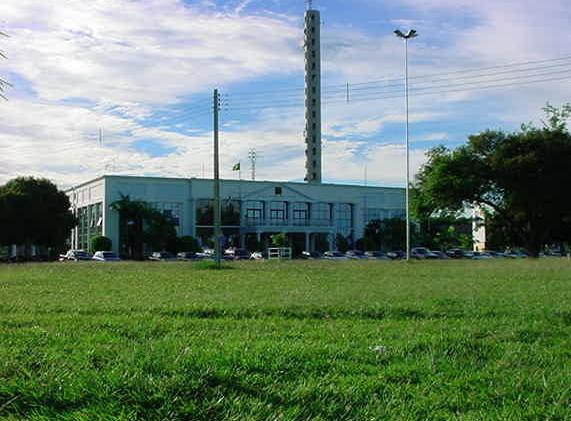
The Palácio Senador Hélio Campos represented not only the creation of the executive, but also the independence from the Palácio Rio Negro, in Manaus.

In 1943, the president of the republic Getúlio Vargas created five new federal territories, of which two were renamed (Guaporé became Rondônia), two were eliminated in 1946 (Ponta Porã and Iguaçu), and one in 1988 (Fernando de Noronha). Until then Acre was the only federal territory. The present-day state of Roraima was called the Território Federal do Rio Branco.

This act made the region a bit more visited. A Division of Production, Land and Colonization (Divisão de Produção, Terra e Colonização, DPTC) was created, which realized surveys concerning the natural resources of the territory, recording lands and organizing agricultural colonies, among other functions.

The first acts of the new territory were:

- Construction of 52 residences in the centre of the capital;
- Construction of the scholastic groups Lobo D'Almada, Osvaldo Cruz, Professor Diomedes and Afrânio Peixoto;
- Installation of the Monteiro Lobato Regional Normal Course, which prepared professors, and the gymnasium Euclides da Cunha
- Constitution of the Blue Legion to prepare the terrain for the road from Mucajaí to Caracaraí;
- Creation of the three primary agricultural colonies of the territory, Coronel Mota (in Taiano), Braz de Aguiar (in Cantá), and Fernando Costa (in Mucajaí)

In order that these colonies would become populated, there was a package prepared for immigrants from Maranhão, which included passage to Boa Vista, lodging in the capital during the period of adaptation, 25 hectares of land, agricultural tools, seeds, plant shoots, mosquito nets, medicine, and medical and technical assistance, mechanical combine for the production of manioc flour, and ₢$30,000 for six months.

During the 1960s and 70s, the military expanded the infrastructure, giving support so that businesses and workers would establish themselves in the region. Diamonds caused great interest in the area during the 1980s, and Roraima experienced its greatest population growth during this period.

In its last decade as a federal territory, two federal highways were opened, the BR-174 and the BR-210. Along these roadways colonization projects in the dozens were started. In 1982, 42 agricultural colonies were being developed. The neighborhood streets are perpendicular to the highways which augmented the number of lots, and consequently colonizers, who came especially from Maranhão and southern Brazil.

=== Gold and diamonds ===
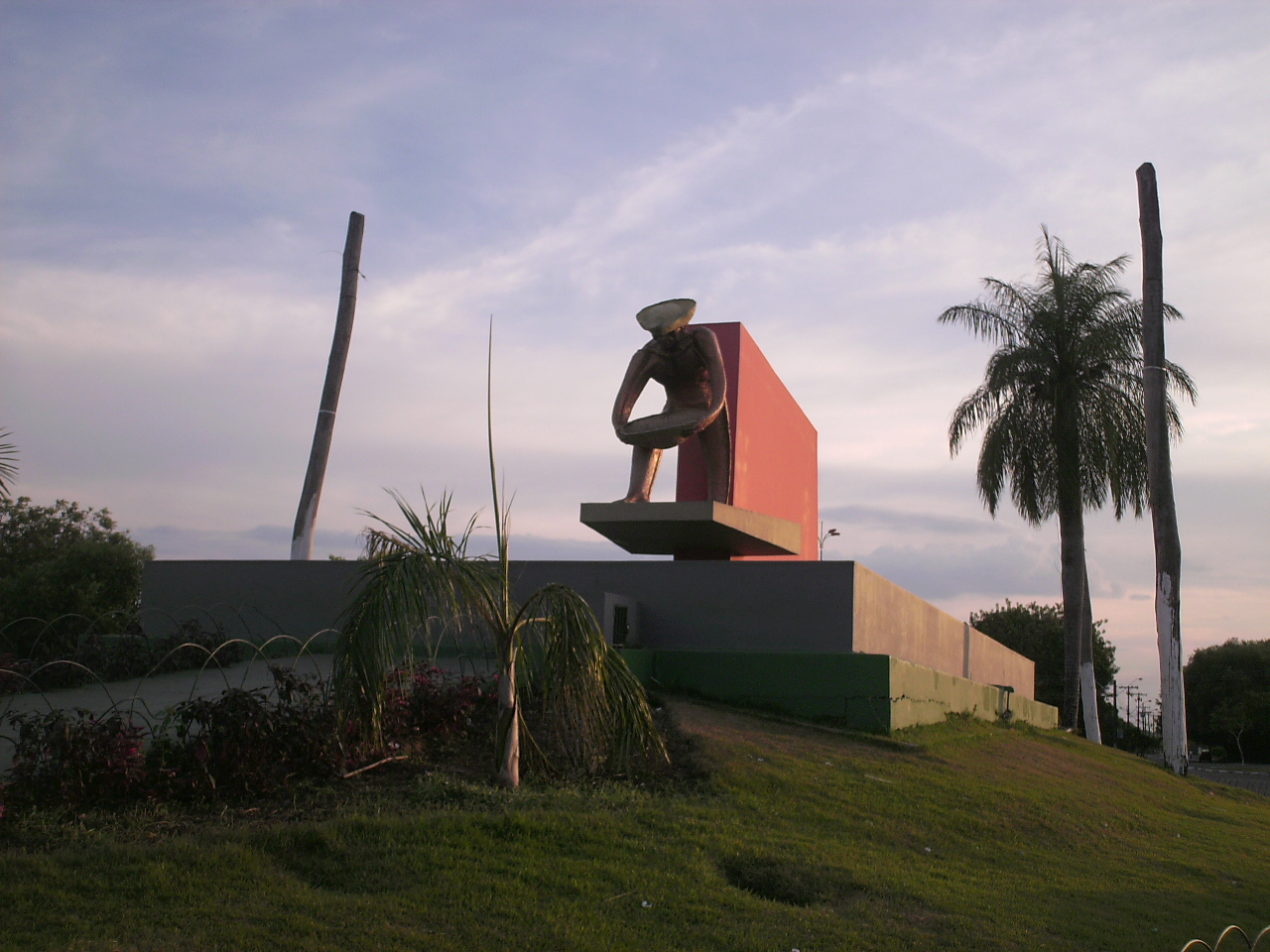
Monumento aos Garimpeiros, constructed in honor of diamond searchers

Production of gold in Roraima

Year	Production (kg)
1985	161
1986	104
1987	167
1988	334
1989	325
1990	5.646
1991	3.469
1992	1.038

In the western part of Roraima there are numerous places where gold can be found. From 1987 to 1991 108 clandestine routes were constructed in the territory of the Yanomamö. The diamond was, probably, the most powerful attractant of population and economic development in the history of the region, and, without doubt, the most destructive and damaging to the environment. It is also known that there is other mineral wealth in the territory, including uranium, thorium, cobalt, molybdenum, titanium, tantalite, columbite, cassiterite, gold, and diamonds, along with various other minerals. Diamond hunting in the area began in the 1930s, by Severino Mineiro, from Paraíba. The oldest and most productive regions were:

- Serra do Tepequém
- Serra do Maturuca
- Serra Verde
- Cotingo River valley
- Quinô River valley
- Igarapé do Suapi
- Igarapé do Sapão
- Mau River valley
- Água Fria

In the middle of the 1980s, this mushroomed in an uncontrolled and unsustainable growth, bringing to the state tens of thousands of immigrants from Northeastern Brazil, neighboring states, southern Brazil, and even other countries. Diamond hunting was done with machines, which made the work quicker, but also more destructive.

An example of the destructive power of the machines used is Tepequém, in the municipality of Amajari, where there is a space in the river called a "funnel" for its formation, acquired as a consequence of explosions made by seekers of gold, diamonds, and other precious stones. Until a few years after the gold rush, when the territory was demarcated as the Parque Indígena Ianomâmi. The environment was preserved, containing many marks left by the exploration which are still visible.

Production of diamonds in Roraima

Year	Production (carats)
1985	6,913
1986	12,871
1987	6,100
1988	8,500
1989	50,000
1990	100,000
1991	100,000
1992	85,000

The data for the quantity of diamonds found in Roraima is imprecise, due to lightness of the goods, which allows easy transport and hence tax evasion.

=== The administration of the territory ===
The federal territory of Rio Branco was officially established on September 13, 1943 with the Decree-Law No. 5812, but a governor was only named in June 1944, during the Second World War. The governors of federal territories were named by the president of the republic. In general, the administrative history of the territory can be divided into three periods:

Period before the military dictatorship (1943–1964)

In all 15 governors administrated the region, on average for a short period of 16 months, which impeded the anticipated growth of the area.

1. Capitan Ene Garcez dos Reis (21 months)
2. Lieutenant Coronel Félix Valois de Araújo (26 months)
3. Captain Clóvis Nova da Costa (13 months)
4. Dr. Miguel Ximenes de Melo (22 months)
5. Prof. Jerocílio Gueiros (9 months)
6. Colonel Belarmino Neves Galvão (6 months)
7. Sr. Aquilino da Mota Duarte (12 months)
8. Dr. José Luiz de Araújo Neto (19 months)
9. Lieutenant-colonel Auris Coelho e Silva (6 months)
10. General-Médico Ademar Soares da Rocha (5 months)
11. Captain José Maria Barbosa (35 months)
12. Sr. Hélio Magalhães de Araújo (26 months)
13. Dr. Djacir Cavalcanti de Arruda (5 months)
14. General Clóvis Noda da Costa (second term) (17 months)
15. Dr. Francisco de Assis Albuquerque (18 months)

Period of the military dictatorship (1964–1985)

There were eight governors during the 20 years of the military regime.

1. Lieutenant-Colonel Dilermando Cunha da Rocha (40 months)
2. Lieutenant-Colonel Hélio da Costa Campos (14 months)
3. Major Walmor Leal Dalcin (10 months)
4. Lieutenant-Colonel Hélio da Costa Campos (second term) (49 months)
5. Colonel Fernando Ramos Pereira (60 months)
6. Brigadier Ottomar de Sousa Pinto (47 months)
7. Brigadier Vicente de Magalhães Morais (9 months)
8. General Arídio Martins de Magalhães (19 months)

Period after the military dictatorship (1985–1990)

During this short period of five years that preceded the transformation of the territory into a state, the territory was governed by four people.

1. Doctor Getúlio Alberto de Souza Cruz (28 months)
2. General Roberto Pinheiro Klein (11 months)
3. Dr. Romero Jucá (18 months)
4. Sr. Rubens Vilar de Carvalho (8 months)

=== New territory, new municipalities ===
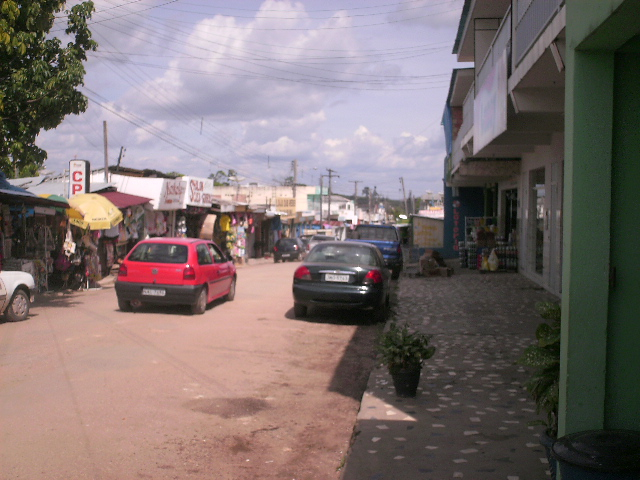
Commercial centre of the small Pacaraima, on the border with Venezuela.

To form the federal territory, three municipalities were separated and maintained. Moura and Barcelos were separated and Boa Vista do Rio Branco was kept in the region, becoming the capital. The decree that established the territory created the municipalities Boa Vista (simplifying its name by excluding "do Rio Branco") and Catrimani. The latter never was established, and in 1955 it was extinguished and in its place was Caracaraí. In all, there were seven districts, four in Boa Vista (Boa Vista proper, Conceição do Mau, Depósito and Uraricoera) and three in Caracaraí (Caracaraí proper, Santa Maria do Boiaçu and São José do Anauá).

In 1962, the Roraiman federal deputy Valério Caldas de Magalhães presented a law project to change the name of Território Federal do Rio Branco to Território Federal de Roraima. The suggestion was prompted by confusion between the territory and the capital of Acre, Rio Branco. The name Roraima, from the Yanomamö language meaning "green mountain," refers to the imposing Mount Roraima found on the border between Brazil, Venezuela, and Guyana, the high point of the region.

With the territory more populated and developed, in 1982 Law No. 7009 of July 1 was approved, creating eight new municipalities, three with territory taken from Boa Vista (Alto Alegre, Bonfim and Normandia, and four with territory taken from Caracaraí (Mucajaí, São João da Baliza and São Luiz, better known as São Luiz do Anauá).

A few years later, in 1994, with Roraima already transformed into a state, two more municipalities were created: Caroebe from territory taken from São João da Baliza and Iracema, from Mucajaí. In the following year, 1995, five more municipalities were created. Amajari and Pacaraima, with land taken from Boa Vista, Uiramutã, from Normandia, Cantá, from Bonfim, and, finally, Rorainópolis from São Luiz (do Anauá). Rorainópolis is now the second-largest city in the state and has the greatest annual growth rate in population. The laws did not identify districts within the new municipalities.

=== 1988: a state aborning ===
Article 14 of the Act of Transitory Provisions of the Constitution of Brazil states that the Federal Territory of Roraima would become a state. The law was promulgated in 1988 and the territory became a state on October 5, 1988.

However, more than a year and a half was required before the region gained its first elected governor, on January 1, 1991, Brigadier Ottomar de Sousa Pinto, who had served as governor of the territory during the military dictatorship. He installed his secretaries of state by means of a provisional measure:

Secretaries of Means

- Secretary of State of Administration
- Secretary of State of the Treasury
- Secretary of State of Planning, Industry, and Commerce

Secretaries of Ends

- Secretary of State of Education
- Secretary of State of Health
- Secretary of State of Labor and Social Well-being
- Secretary of State of Agriculture and Provisions
- Secretary of State of Public Services and Works
- Secretary of State of Public Security
- Secretary of State of the Interior and Justice

In addition, other positions created were the Civil Cabinet, Military Cabinet, Attorney General, Vice-Governor and Military Police.

=== The legislature and judiciary are created ===
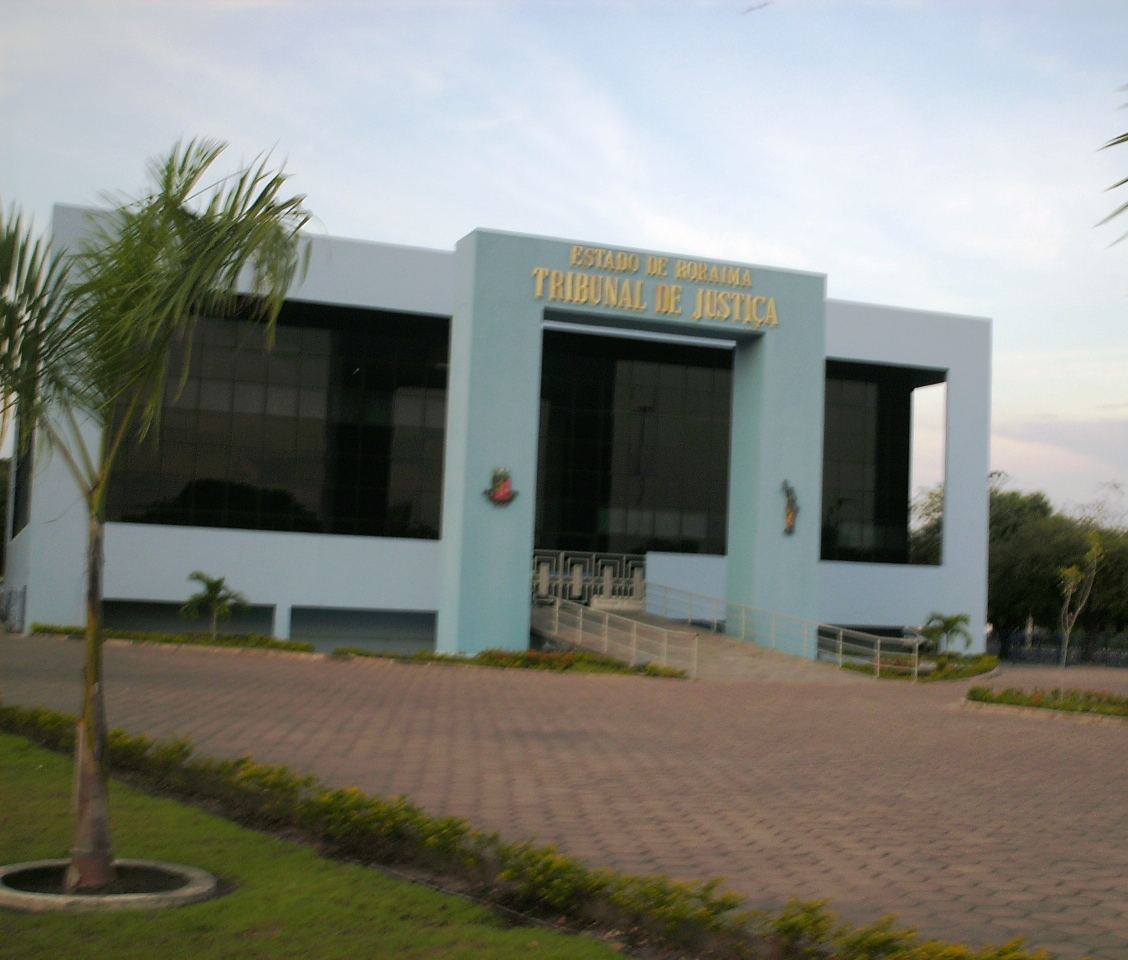
The current Tribunal of Justice of Roraima, the seat of the state's judicial authority.

For a state to be recognized as a democracy it should have separation of powers between its three branches of government. In 1990 the bench of the state deputy was elected, constituting the legislature of the new state, consisting of 24 representatives, in a session that began on January 1, 1991. The first president of the Roraiman legislature was Flávio Chaves.

The first sessions functioned in temporary locations, improvised in three halls located in the State Bank of Roraima. However, months later the assembly was transferred to the Tribunal of Justice (now the Sobral Pinto Forum), in the central square of the city. After eight months, there was another move, this time definitive, to the recently inaugurated Antônio Martins Palace. In the 1994 election, the engineer Neudo Campos was elected governor, and he assumed the position in 1995. He was re-elected in 1998.

=== 1998: a state in flames ===
In February and March 1998, Roraima experienced severe fires. The extreme dryness destroyed, according to the calculations of specialists, at least 30% of the forests and pastures. The strongest effects were felt in the north of the state, affecting the entire settlements of Apiaú, Boqueirão and As Confianças. A battalion of about 2,000 firefighters from the army, military police, air force, and the fire departments of several Brazilian cities and even overseas cities was mobilized to combat the flames. The cooperation between the states to deal with the situation reached a level never before seen.

The federal government (led by president Fernando Henrique Cardoso) recognized the seriousness of the situation late, which resulted in criticism. The federal government spent R$17 million and the state government, R$6.2 million. In all, 33,000 square kilometers of Roraima were affected by the burn. Reports confirm that the fires began in the settlements of small farmers, with planned burns lit in order to prepare the land for new crops.

Smoke lingered over Boa Vista and the interior for several days, causing numerous respiratory problems and eye infections. In order to prevent a recurrence, fire brigades were created, formed from firefighters and technicians who taught the farmers and producers to prepare fields for cultivation in such a way that if fire is used, it is not allowed to spread.

== The 21st century: unemployment and corruption scandals ==
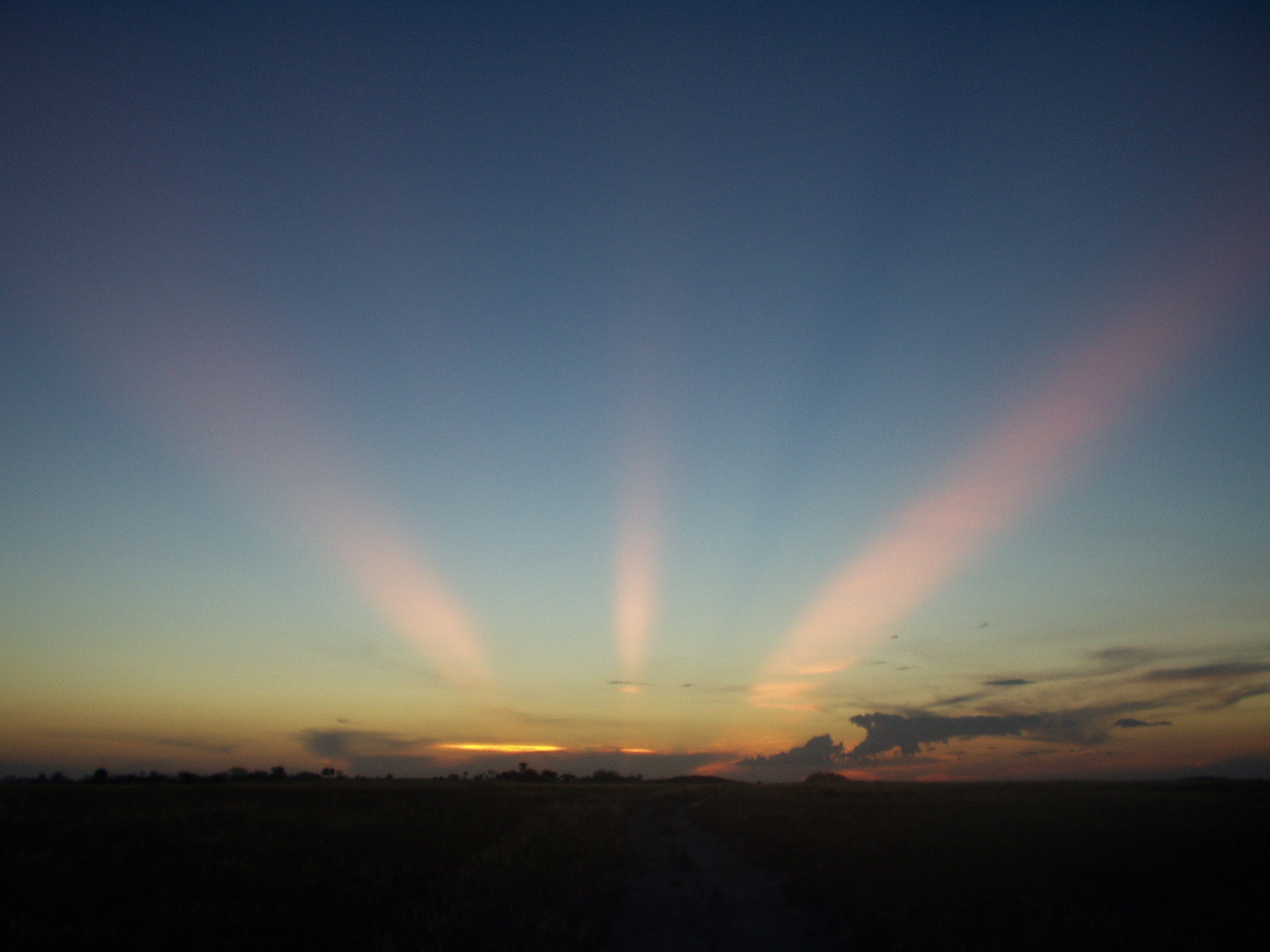
Sunrise over Tepequém

The Millennium Portal, a monument to mark the beginning of the second millennium, was inaugurated in 2000 at the Praça das Águas. At the turn of the 21st century, immigration into the area continued at a high rate, encouraged perhaps by the contract of people for public services without public contests, people who in many cases were not qualified for the work in the area. The state government employed at least 30,000 people.

=== Resignations and elections ===
In the first years of the 2000s, the governor Neudo Campos resigned from his office in order to run for another office, and the vice-governor, Francisco Flamarion Portela took his place. Flamarion ran in the elections of 2002, against the former governor Ottomar Pinto; in the first round Ottomar won by a small margin, but in the second round, Flamarion Portela won.

Portela served six years as governor, from 2001 to 2006. In his first years after being elected, a corruption scandal exploded. Following an investigation by the federal police, several important politicians of the region, in general deputies, were imprisoned, including the former governor Neudo Campos. A few days later they were released.

=== Public races ===
However, what most stained the second term of Portela in the eyes of the public was the tax levied by the Attorney General for the realization of public races, dismissing a large part of the staff of bureaucrats of the state. Flamarion yielded to the requirements and there were such races, with tests developed by Universidade de Brasília.

The number of positions available in the race was much smaller than the number of government employees, which resulted, after the races, in a high level of unemployment which had negative repercussions on the market and immigration into the state. The popularity of Portela thus fell, even though he was not responsible for the races. At this time, the ex-governor Ottomar Pinto was leading a court case to annul the governor who had defeated him in the 2002 election. The accusation consisted of electoral crime, based on evidence that Portela had infringed laws during the election period.

=== Portela and Pinto, annulment and power ===
In 2004, Flamarion Portela was dismissed and his vice-governor provisionally became president of the Assembly Mecias de Jesus. Hours afterward, at the Boa Vista International Airport Ottomar de Souza Pinto, the runner-up in the elections, deplaned in order to be judicially appointed governor for the second time, third if you count his tenure during the territorial period.

The investiture was done at the Palácio Senador Hélio Campos, informally known as the Governor's Palace, before thousands of people in the Civic Center Square, near the Prospector's Monument. One of the first promises Ottomar made upon his return to power was to "save" health, which had disintegrated into chaos in the end of the terms of Neudo and Flamarion. Although many hospitals had been reformed and expanded, allegations of medical negligence were becoming widespread, although inquiries were showing the opposite.

In 2006, new elections for governor were held. Ottomar was re-elected, along with his vice-governor Anchieta Júnior, with a wide margin in front of the other candidates; the team garnered 62.4% of the total vote, or 116,542 votes. The runner-up in the first round, the Pernambucan and ex-minister of Lula, Romero Jucá, who had also served as governor when Roraima was a territory, had more than 30% fewer votes, and thus no second round was necessary.

Toward the end of 2006 the Electoral Public Ministry accused governor Pinto of abusing his power, and even suggested that he be removed from office. Early in 2007, the governor suffered another impugnment, this time from the Federal Public Ministry of Roraima, also for alleged abuses of power.

=== The indigenous reserves ===
Roraima is one of the states in Brazil with the largest area designated as indigenous reserves, covering approximately 70% of the total territory. In fact, these territories along with federal territories make it so that less than 9% of the state's area is free from external restrictions, which explains the reason several critics have criticized the restrictions and demarcations within the state.

Below are extracts from a letter sent by the Yanomami to senator Severo Fagundes Gomes, on January 24, 1986, from Boa Vista. The senator was active in the creation of the Yanomami Park.

"His Excellency Sr. Senator Severo Gomes

We have become aware of your project to create a Yanomami Park. We feel that the project is very good and important for us, the Yanomami. In this way, we will be able to live peacefully...without needing to war against white prospectors and farmers.

...We know that the governor of Roraima spoke negatively of the project, saying that you do not know our land. Perhaps you don't know it, but we know it very well...and thus we can say that your project is very good...We, the Yanomami Indians, ask your help to remove the prospectors from the invaded areas of the Ericó, Novo, and Apiaú Rivers in Roraima. We know that the area near Mount Neblina, Amazonas, has also been invaded. The creation of the Yanomami Park is urgent...

If it is necessary, we can go to Brasilia to help. Thank you very much for your support.

Davi Xiriana Yanomami
Ivanildo Wanaweythey"

The areas mentioned specifically in the passage were the regions which became later the indigenous park after the approval of the project. The right of the land was disputed by prospectors and farmers. With the restrictions in place, prospecting fell and the fragile state economy was weakened.

The last area designated was Raposa/Serra do Sol. Several protests were launched in Boa Vista against the "continuous" nature of the demarcation (even some indigenous people were against this), defending an "island" style of demarcation. A continuous demarcation left national boundaries exposed, extinguished the seats of municipalities and hurt various farms which produced grain and towns.

However, in April 2005, the president Luiz Inácio Lula da Silva sanctioned the law which would create a large continuous indigenous reserve, although with certain exceptions. Among these exceptions are the distancing of the territory several kilometers from the international border and the withdrawing of the municipal settlements from the territory.

==== Table of indigenous reserves ====
Name	Size (ha)
Ananás	1.769
Aningal	7.627
Anta	2.550
Barata/Livramento	18.830
Boqueirão	13.950
Canuanim	6.324
Ianomami	9.419.108
Jabuti	8.000
Jacamim	107.000
Malacacheta	16.150
Mangueira	4.033
Manoá/Pium	43.330
Ouro	13.572
Pium	3.810
Ponta da Serra	15.597
Raimundão	4.300
Raposa Serra do Sol	1.747.464
Recanto da Saudade	13.750
Santa Inês	29.698
São Marcos	624.110
Wai-Wai	330.000
Waimiri/Atoari	514.000
Xununumetamu	48.750
Total	1.2783.338

== Topics in Roraima history ==
=== Culture ===
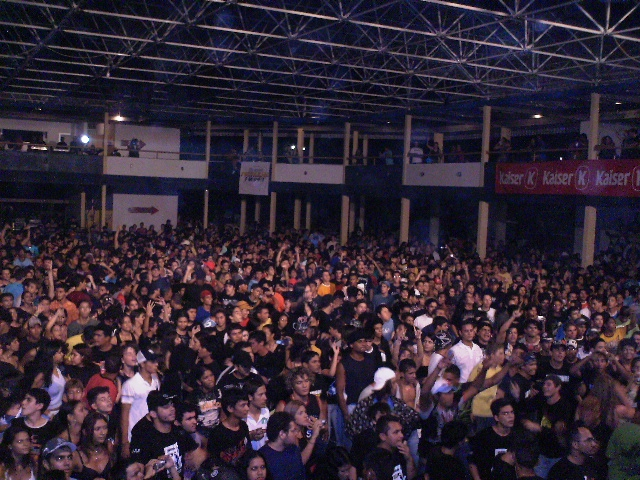
Partial view of the audience of a show of the rock band, Raimundos.

Before the Western exploration of the area, Roraima culture was composed only of indigenous traditions. With the arrival of the Portuguese, their customs and traditions began to spread in the region. Later, with the arrival of the English missionary Thomas Yound, British religious and other customs began to be taught. Decades later, with the arrival of Northeastern and Southern Brazilians with the economic growth and the construction of Boa Vista, Roraiman culture became a mix of the cultures from various places in the country and the natives. The forró, for example, became established as one of the most widely heard rhythms of the region in that period.

Today, with the arrival of immigrants from all states, attracted by the public exhibitions, as well as from abroad (especially Guyana and Venezuela, but also Colombia and Bolivia), it is difficult to define the state of Roraima culturally. Although the region has had an increase in shows of Brazilian popular music and rock music, forró continues to predominate. In artistry, indigenous traditions continue to inspire.

=== Economy ===
Roraima began to have an economy at the end of the 18th century with the creation of the livestock industry, whose pioneer was the commander Manuel da Gama Lobo D'Almada, who introduced cattle and horses in 1789. When Boa Vista do Rio Branco was founded in 1890, it provided an incentive for growth, both economic and demographic. This further increased with the construction of the road from Manaus.

Today the state contributes the lowest fraction of any state to the gross national product of Brazil, about 0.1%. Despite this, the state economy has achieved the highest growth indices of all the federal units in Brazil.

The GNP is based on the service sector, which is responsible for 87.4% of the product. In the modest industrial capital district there are factories of soap, concrete, soft drinks, and wood; the latter is the primary export product, responsible for 76% of the 7 million U.S. dollars collected.

=== Education ===
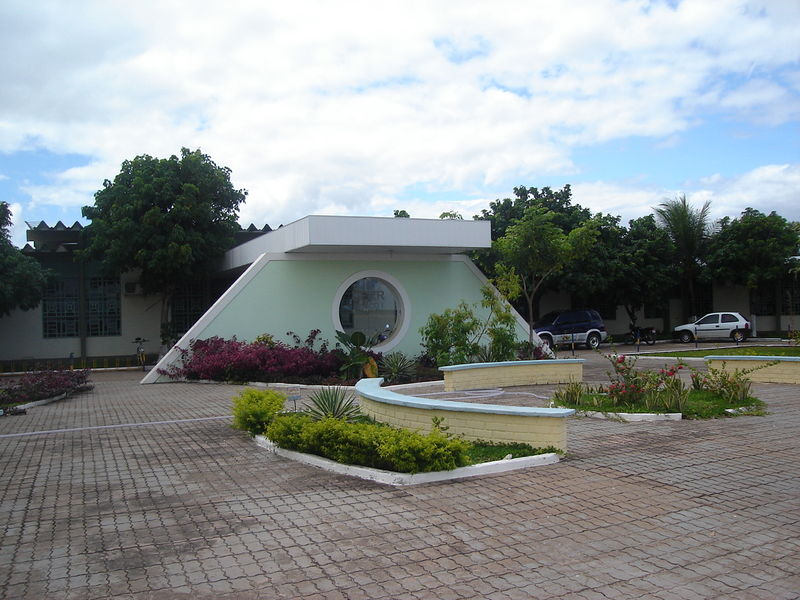
Photograph of the front of Block I of the Universidade Federal.

Education in Roraima began among the indigenous, who inculcated among their youth the local tribal languages, customs, and traditions. Their cultural heritage remains even today in the state, although they are dwindling today as residents from the cities are sent by the state and federal governments to educate the indigenous people. The Evangelical missionary Thomas Yound was the first to instruct the natives in Christianity, though he was expelled from the territory for it

In 1943, with the creation of the Federal Territory of Rio Branco, public schools began to multiply, whether organized on a municipal or territorial level. Various school groups were created and preparatory courses for the professors were initiated.

Starting in the 1990s, with the establishment of the state, a political position of Secretary of State of Education was created, which contributed to the improvement in education and the infrastructure of colleges. An example of the improved infrastructure is that in 2000 the state achieved the distinction of having the schools with the best structures in the country.

The 1980s saw the establishment of several institutions of higher learning. In 1989, the Universidade Federal de Roraima (UFRR) was inaugurated. In 1987 the Escola Técnica Federal de Roraima was inaugurated, in what was the periphery of Boa Vista (Pricumã), but which rapidly grew afterwards, turning itself into the Centro Federal de Educação Tecnológica.

In 1997, the state's first federal public school of basic education, belonging to the UFRR, was created. Afterwards, becoming a state organ, was given a large building and departments in basic education and medicine, a "school of application." A few years later it became part of the Federal University and in 2005 became, effectively, one of several centers of education in the country.

In 2006 the first state university was inaugurated, the Universidade Estadual de Roraima (UERR) and also the first Virtual University, the Universidade Virtual de Roraima, administrated by the state government. There are also several large private universities, especially in the capital.

=== Demographics and population ===
Beginning in the middle of the 20th century, Rio Branco began to grow. The population increase was low until the 1970s; however, stimulated by diverse factors, the numbers began to jump in the succeeding decades, as can be seen in the chart below.

Source: IBGE. Notes: ¹ In July 2000. ² Estimated August 2005.

Among the factors for this growth are the opening of BR-174 (Manaus-Boa Vista-Pacaraima), and the development campaign by the government of Roraima, including the opening of diamond prospecting. Before the opening of BR-174, the only communication link between the capitals of Roraima and Amazonas were along the Rio Branco, which is only navigable three to four months of the year.

The place of origin of the immigrants to Roraima are diverse, but the most common are from the northeast. The chart below shows the state of origin of the immigrants.

State of origin	Percentage
Amazonas	35,20%
Maranhão	27,39%
Ceará	13,95%
Pará	6,61%
Piauí	3,74%
Rio Grande do Sul	2,93%
Rio Grande do Norte	2,91%
Paraná	1,81%
Others	15,46%

== See also ==
- History of Rondônia
- History of Acre
- History of Brazil
- History of Guyana
- History of Portugal
