= Thieres Pinto =

Brazilian businessman and politician

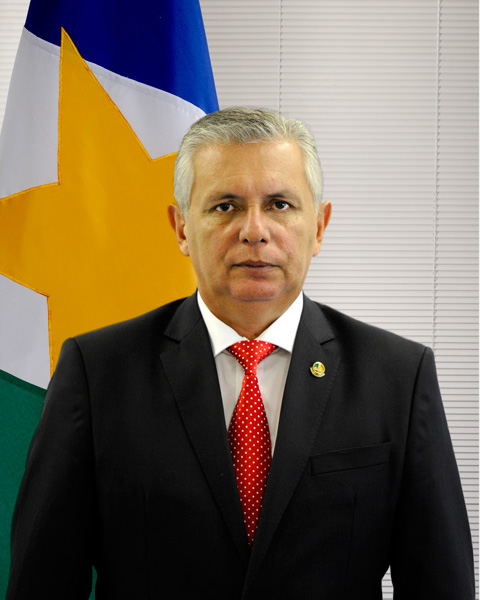

Senator from Roraima
- Incumbent
- Assumed office 15 December 2016

Personal details
- Born: Thieres Pinto de Mesquita Filho; 27 April 1962 (age 62); Santa Quitéria, Ceará, Brazil
- Political party: PTB
- Occupation: Businessman

Thieres Pinto de Mesquita Filho (born 27 April 1962 in Santa Quitéria) is a Brazilian businessman and politician affiliated to the Brazilian Labour Party (PTB). He currently is in office of senator of the Republic. In 2014, Thieres was elected 1st Substitute of senator Telmário Mota, elected by the Democratic Labour Party (PDT), for the Federal Senate.

In December 2016, after the discharge of Mota, assumed office as senator.
