= Normandia, Roraima =

Municipality of Roraima, Brazil

Normandia
- Municipality
- Municipio de Normandia
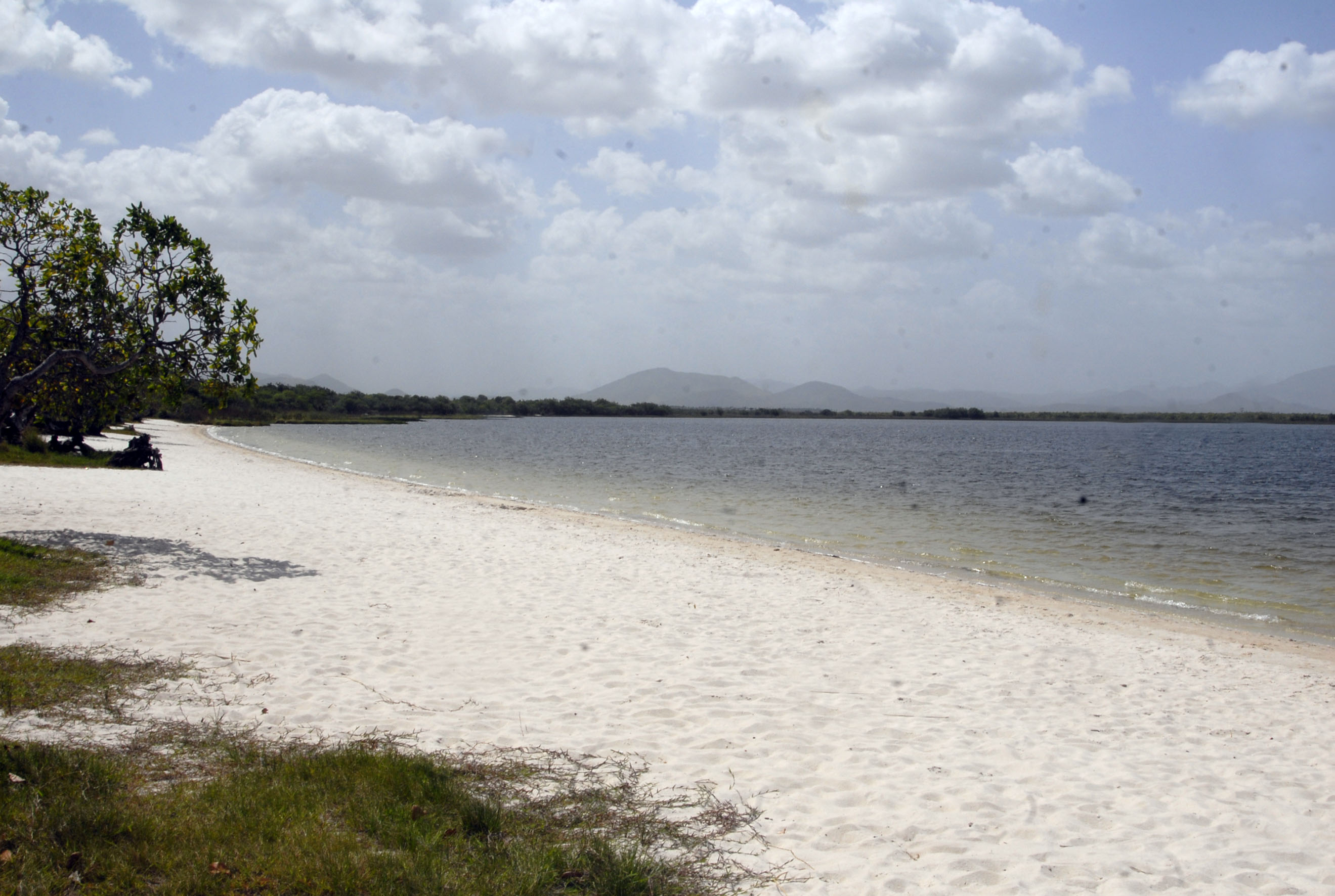
- Lake Caracaranã in the Raposa Serra do Sol indigenous reserve

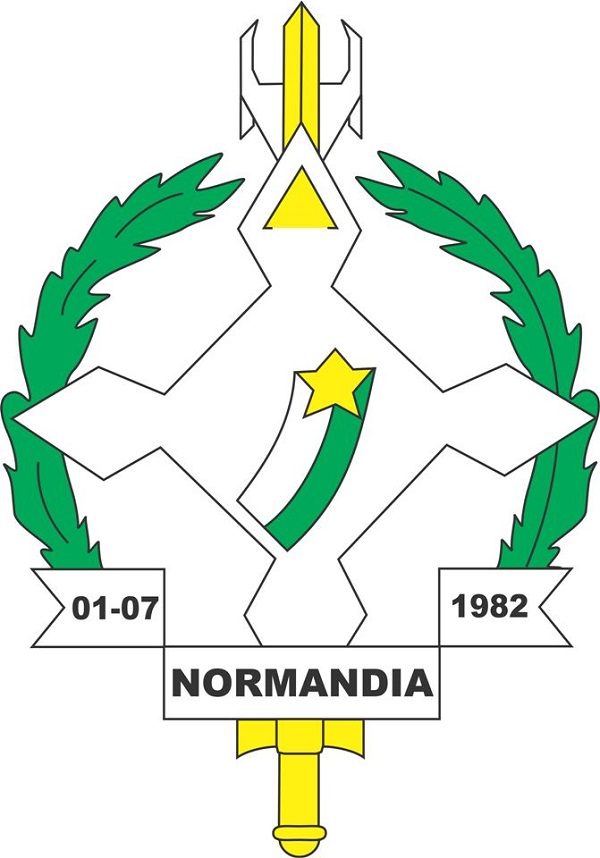
- Flag Coat of arms

- Location of Normandia in the State of Roraima

- Location in Brazil
- Coordinates: 03°52′51″N 59°37′22″W
- Country: Brazil
- Region: North
- State: Roraima
- Founded: 9 July 1890

Government
  - Mayor: Vicente Adolfo Brasil (PDT)

Area
  - Total: 6,960 km^{2} (2,690 sq mi)
- Elevation: 100 m (330 ft)

Population (2022)
  - Total: 13,986
  - Density: 1.28/km^{2} (3.3/sq mi)
- Time zone: UTC−4 (AMT)
- Postal Code: 69355-000

Normandia (Brazilian Portuguese pronunciation: [noʁmɐ̃ˈdʒi.ɐ]) is a city located in the northeastern region of the Brazilian state of Roraima. Normandia covers 6,960 km^{2} (2,690 mi^{2}), and has an estimated population of 11,532 as of 2020 with a population density of 1.28 inhabitants per square kilometer. The municipality consists almost entirely of indigenous areas; 98.6% of the land area of the city is part of the Raposa Serra do Sol indigenous reserve. The remaining area consists of the city seat located close to the Ireng River which forms the Brazil-Guyana border.

== Climate ==
Normandia is located in an ecotone, a transition area between two biomes. The municipality sits between the great tropical Amazon rainforest region and the cerrado, an open Savanna-type grassland. The transition area is known locally as the lavrado. The lavrado of Roraima, and of Normandia, is relatively dry compared to the nearby Amazonian rainforest areas; it receives between 1,100 mm (43 in) and 1,400 mm (55 in) of precipitation per year.

== History ==
Normandia takes its name from the region of Normandy in France, the birthplace of settler Henri Charrière, better known as "Papillon". Charrière was sentenced to serve time in a maximum security prison on Devil's Island in French Guiana. He and several inmates managed to escape from French Guiana to Brazil and settled in the area of present-day Normandia. While Charrière left the settlement after four or five years, other inmates became permanent residents. The Municipality of Normandia (Municipio de Normandia) was created by Federal Law No. 7,009 of July 1982, with land separated from the state capital of Boa Vista.

== Lake Caracaranã ==
Lake Caracaranã, located in Normandia, is one of the tourist destinations of the state of Roraima. It has some tourist facilities and is located only 180 km (110 mi) from the state capitol of Boa Vista. Lake Caracaranã, with a perimeter of 5.8 km, is surrounded by sandy beaches and native cashew trees. With the demarcation of the Raposa Serra do Sol indigenous reserve, access to the lake was closed. It reopened in 2013 and now tourists pay a nominal fee to visit the lake.

== Economy and infrastructure ==
The main sources of income in Normandia are tourism (primarily to Lake Caracaranã), livestock, and mining. The city has one public hospital, Ruth Quitéria, with 22 beds, and a health clinic in the city seat, Health Centre Iracema Galvão. Several health posts serve the indigenous communities of Normandia. There is a special squad (located in Boa Vista) subject to the Jungle Infantry Brigade border that protects the city and controls its sole airport. Normandia has a system of water distribution, electricity (distributed by CER, through thermal), post office, bank branch and telephone network. There are 26 elementary schools and 2 high schools. Normandia has a single television channel, 7-TV Roraima, an affiliate of Rede Globo.

== Transportation ==
Normandia is connected to the state capital of Boa Vista by a single highway, BR-401, a distance of 185 km (115 mi).

== Notable people ==
- Telmário Mota (b. 1958), politician
