= Lake Caracaranã =

Lake in Roraima, Brazil

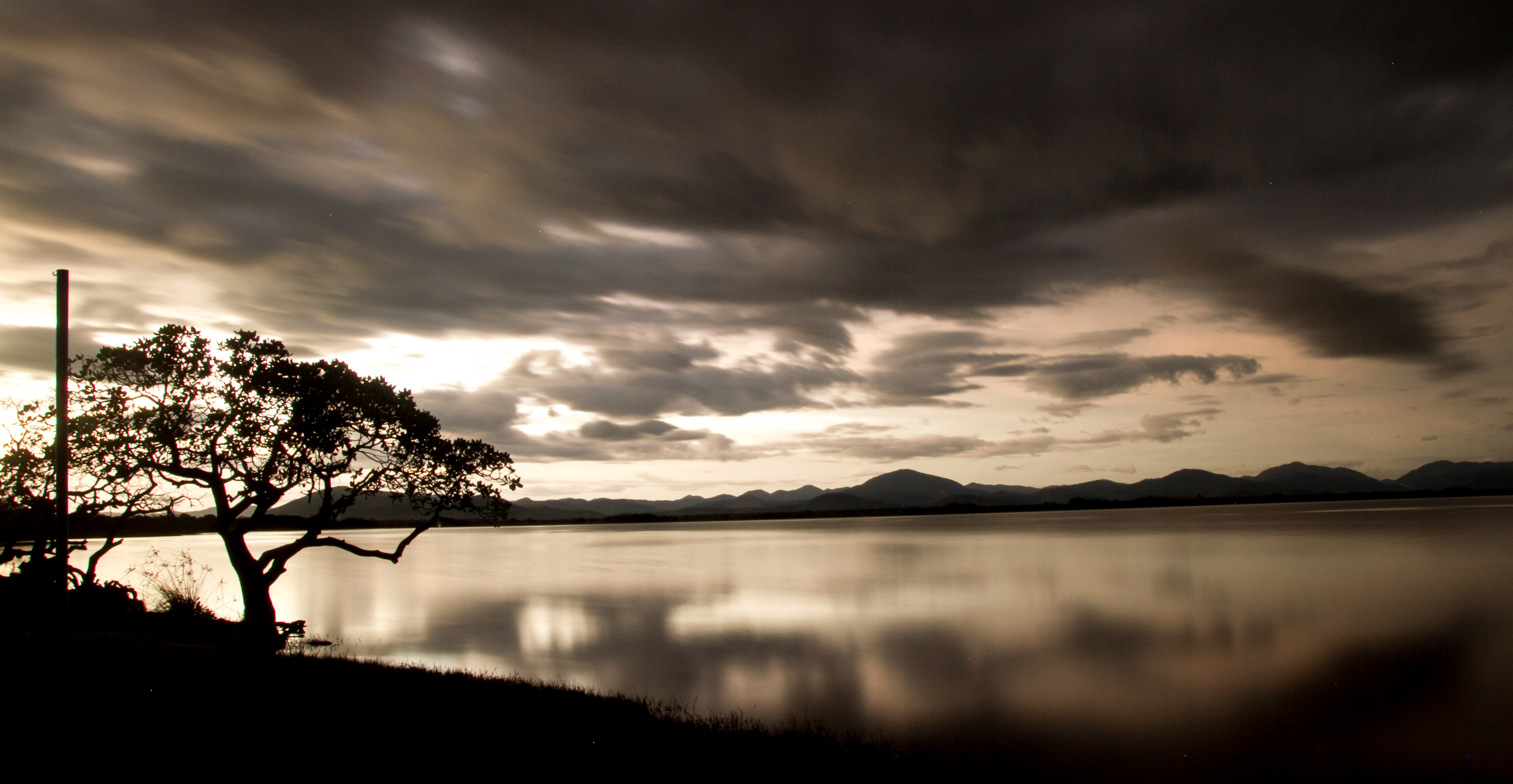
- Sunset on Lake Caracaranã

- Location within Brazil
- Interactive map of Lake Caracaranã
- Location: Roraima, Brazil
- Coordinates: 3.8442°N 59.7832°W
- Surface area: 5.8 km^{2} (2.2 sq mi)

Lake Caracaranã (Portuguese: Lago Caracaranã) is a lake in the Normandia municipality of Roraima, Brazil. The lake is located in the Raposa Serra do Sol indigenous territory.

Lake Caracaranã is one of the tourist destinations of the state of Roraima. It has some tourist facilities and is located 217 km (135 mi) from Boa Vista, the state capital. The lake is surrounded by white sandy beaches with cashew trees and a view on the Pacaraima Mountains in the background.

After the demarcation of the Raposa Serra do Sol indigenous reserve, access to the lake was closed. It reopened in 2013 and tourists now have pay a nominal fee to visit the lake or stay overnight. Alcohol consumption is forbidden in the reservation. The regional centre for the Amerindian reserve is located on the lake.
