= Milestone thesis =

Brazilian judicial case

Temporal Landmark Law
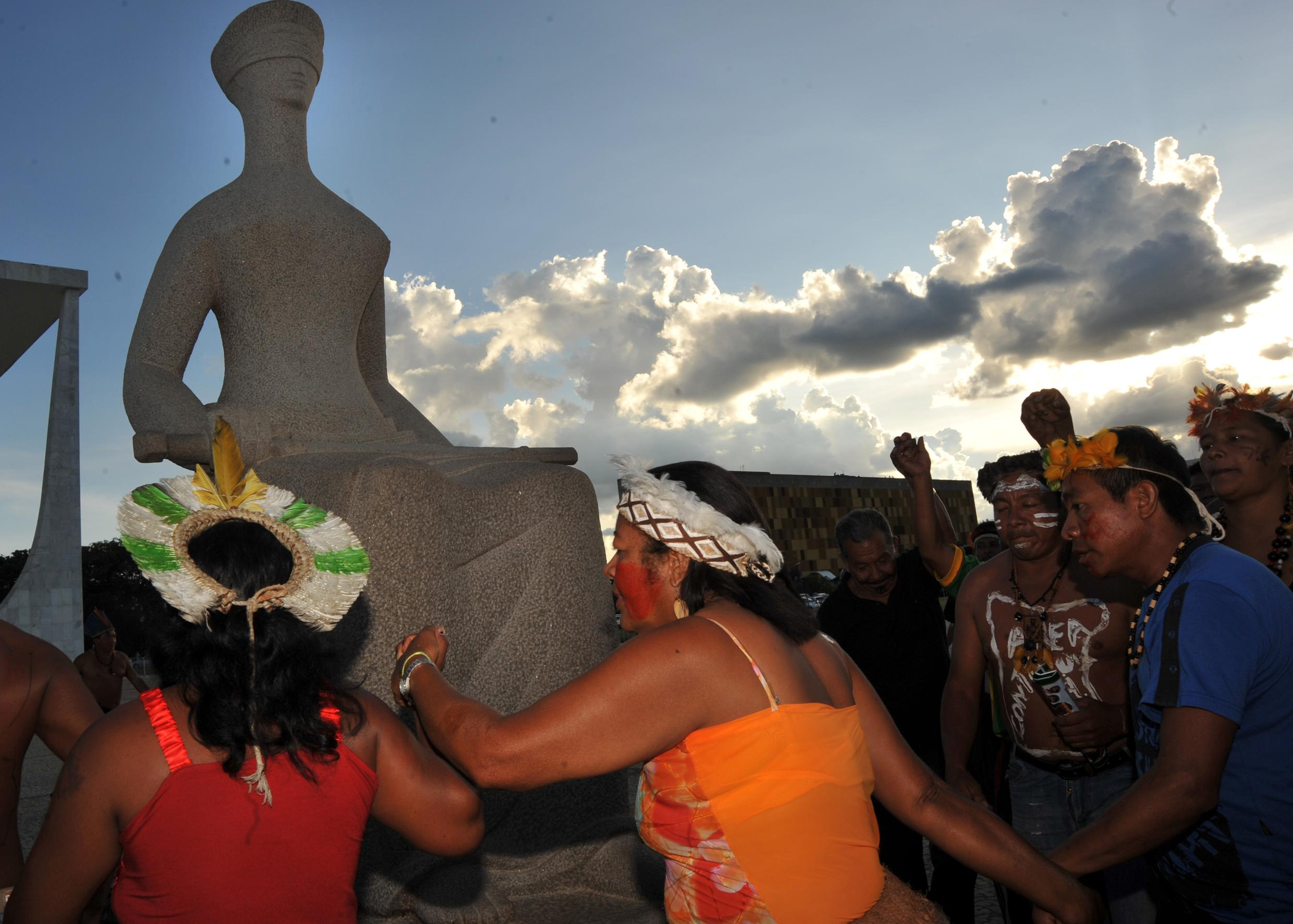
- Indigenous people in front of the A Justiça statue protesting on the day of the Raposa Serra do Sol judgment by the Supreme Federal Court of Brazil, 19 March 2009.

Brazilian National Congress
- Long title: Amends Law No. 6,001 of 19 December 1973, which establishes the Indigenous Statute.
- Citation: Law no. 14701 of 20 October 2023
- Territorial extent: Whole of Brazil
- Passed by: Chamber of Deputies
- Passed: 30 May 2023
- Passed by: Federal Senate
- Passed: 27 September 2023
- Vetoed by: President Luiz Inácio Lula da Silva
- Vetoed: 20 October 2023
- Type of veto: Line-item
- Veto overridden: 14 December 2023

Legislative history

Initiating chamber: Chamber of Deputies
- Bill title: Bill 490/2007
- Bill citation: PL 490/2007
- Introduced by: Dep. Homero Pereira (PR-MT)
- Introduced: 20 March 2007
- Passed: 30 May 2023
- Voting summary: 283 voted for; 155 voted against; 1 abstained

Revising chamber: Federal Senate
- Bill title: Bill 2903/2023
- Bill citation: PL 2903/2023
- Received from the Chamber of Deputies: 1 June 2023
- Passed: 27 September 2023
- Voting summary: 43 voted for; 21 voted against

Final stages
- Reconsidered by the Chamber of Deputies after veto: 14 December 2023
- Voting summary: 137 voted for; 321 voted against
- Reconsidered by the Federal Senate after veto: 14 December 2023
- Voting summary: 19 voted for; 53 voted against

Supreme Federal Court cases
- RE 1017365 - Ruled unconstitutional on 21 September 2023 (Decided 9-2, not valid)

Keywords
- Indigenous peoples in Brazil, Indigenous peoples in Brazil
- Status: In force

The milestone thesis (Portuguese: Marco temporal das terras indígenas, lit. 'Temporal marker for Indigenous lands'), also known as the time marker or Copacabana thesis, is a legal framework established through case law based on the Supreme Federal Court of Brazil's (STF) ruling in the Raposa Serra do Sol case in 2009. In this decision, the Supreme Court ruled that Article 231 of the Constitution, which guarantees the usufruct of lands traditionally occupied by Indigenous peoples in Brazil, should be interpreted as applying only to lands that were in their possession on 5 October 1988, the date the Constitution was promulgated.

== Background ==
=== Raposa Serra do Sol case ===
In 2005, during Luiz Inácio Lula da Silva's administration, the Ministry of Justice demarcated an area of 1,747,464 hectares (4,318,080 acres) in Roraima as an Indigenous territory, namely Raposa Serra do Sol. At the time, the territory was home to 194 Indigenous communities, comprising around 19 thousand people; anyone on the territory who was not part of the Indigenous communities was given one year to vacate the territory.

Rice farmers of Roraima contested this demarcation, arguing that their expulsion would seriously affect the state's economy, and that they had deeds to the lands they occupied. Dozens of motions were submitted to the Supreme Federal Court requesting the demarcation be overturned or be turned discontinuous, so the farmers could remain. These were represented by the landmark Petition (PET) 3388/RR of the Supreme Court.

In March 2009, with a single dissenting vote by minister Marco Aurélio Mello, the Supreme Court ruled the demarcation legal and constitutional. This is the birth of the temporal marker, or milestone, thesis; in his decision, rapporteur Ayres Britto argued the following:

I - o marco temporal da ocupação. Aqui, é preciso ver que a nossa Lei Maior trabalhou com data certa: a data da promulgação dela própria (5 de outubro de 1988) como insubstituível referencial para o reconhecimento, aos índios, "dos direitos sobre as terras que tradicionalmente ocupam". Terras que tradicionalmente ocupam, atente-se, e não aquelas que venham a ocupar. Tampouco as terras já ocupadas em outras épocas, mas sem continuidade suficiente para alcançar o marco objetivo do dia 5 de outubro de 1988. [...]
I - temporal marker of occupation. Here, one must see that our Greater Law works with a certain date: the date of promulgation of itself (5 October 1988) as an irreplaceable reference point for recognition, to indigenous peoples, "of rights over lands they traditionally occupy". Lands they traditionally occupy, note, and not those that they will come to occupy. Much less lands once occupied in other times, but without enough continuity to reach the objective mark of the 5th of October, 1988. [...]

— Britto, Carlos Ayres (19 March 2009). "Petição 3.388 Roraima". Supreme Federal Court (in Brazilian Portuguese). p. 67.

The name "Copacabana thesis" originates from a remark made by Minister Gilmar Mendes during a 2014 case that reaffirmed the temporal marker. He stated: "Certainly, Copacabana had Indigenous people at some point; Avenida Atlântica was undoubtedly inhabited by Indigenous people. Adopting the thesis presented in this opinion, we could, without a doubt, reclaim these apartments in Copacabana, as Indigenous ownership would certainly be established at some point in time."

=== Application to other demarcation cases ===
Following the original decision, in a motion for clarification, the STF specified that the conditions established in the Raposa Serra do Sol ruling applied only to that specific case.

In July 2017, however, during Michel Temer's administration, the Attorney General's Office (AGU) determined the precedent set by the Raposa Serra do Sol case was binding for all processes involving the demarcation of Indigenous lands.

In 2019, the issue resurfaced with the ruling on Extraordinary Appeal No. 1.017.365, a case concerning the recognition of an area claimed by the Xokleng Indigenous people within the Sassafras Biological Reserve in Santa Catarina.

== Decisions and progress ==
RE 1017365
- Judgment in the Raposa Serra do Sol case; starting on page 41, point 78, the reporting minister Carlos Ayres Britto explains the regulatory frameworks of the demarcation process, starting with the "time frame of occupation".
- Court: Supreme Federal Court
- Full case name: Recurso Extraordinário 1.017.365 (Fundação Nacional dos Povos Indígenas v. Instituto do Meio Ambiente de Santa Catarina)
- Started: 14 December 2016
- Decided: 21 September 2023

Court membership
- Judges sitting: President Rosa Weber Justices: Luís Roberto Barroso; Edson Fachin; Luiz Fux; Cármen Lúcia; Nunes Marques; Gilmar Mendes; André Mendonça; Alexandre de Moraes; Dias Toffoli; Cristiano Zanin

Case opinions
- Decision by: Fachin
- Concurrence: Barroso, Fux, Lúcia, Mendes, Moraes, Toffoli, Zanin, Weber
- Dissent: Marques, Mendonça

In the first vote of the trial, Judge Rapporteur Edson Fachin opposed the establishment of a precedent. He argued that the decision regarding Raposa Serra do Sol, rather than resolving the issue, had halted demarcations and escalated conflicts. He also stated that treating Raposa Serra do Sol as a precedent for all Indigenous matters would disadvantage other Indigenous ethnic groups.

The second vote came from Minister Nunes Marques, who supported the thesis, stating: "A theory that argues that land limits are subject to a permanent process of recovery of possession due to ancestral expropriation opens the door to conflicts of all kinds without offering any prospect of pacification."

The trial was suspended on 15 September 2021, when Justice Alexandre de Moraes requested additional time to review the case. On 20 September 2023, the STF resumed the trial, and the following day, a majority was formed to overturn the time frame thesis.

== Reception ==
The STF acknowledged the "general repercussions" of the case, indicating that its decision would establish a precedent for the entire Brazilian judiciary. Following the ruling by Justice Rapporteur Edson Fachin, all proceedings related to the demarcation of Indigenous lands were suspended until the end of the COVID-19 pandemic or the final decision on the extraordinary appeal.

The Attorney General's Office (AGU) defended the thesis, with Attorney General Bruno Bianco, arguing that it established "beacons and safeguards for the promotion of Indigenous rights and for ensuring the regularity of the demarcation of their lands." However, the Public Prosecutor's Office (MPF) opposed the landmark, creating a divergence between the two bodies.

The Attorney General of the Republic, Augusto Aras, stated that "for reasons of legal security, the identification and delimitation of lands traditionally occupied by Indigenous peoples must be done on a case-by-case basis, applying the constitutional norm in force at the time to each specific situation."

Former President Jair Bolsonaro also voiced support for the framework, warning that if the STF were to modify it, it would be "a severe blow to our agribusiness, with almost catastrophic repercussions domestically and abroad."

The Observatório do Clima, a Brazilian environmental regulatory body, referred to the 2023 legislation upholding the thesis as the "Indigenous genocide law." The law would allow increased industrial activities on Indigenous lands, potentially leading to greater deforestation. Despite numerous amendments and vetoes proposed by Brazilian President Luiz Inácio Lula da Silva, the National Congress of Brazil overrode them.
