= Amajari =

Municipality of Roraima, Brazil

- Municipality
- Municipality of Amajari
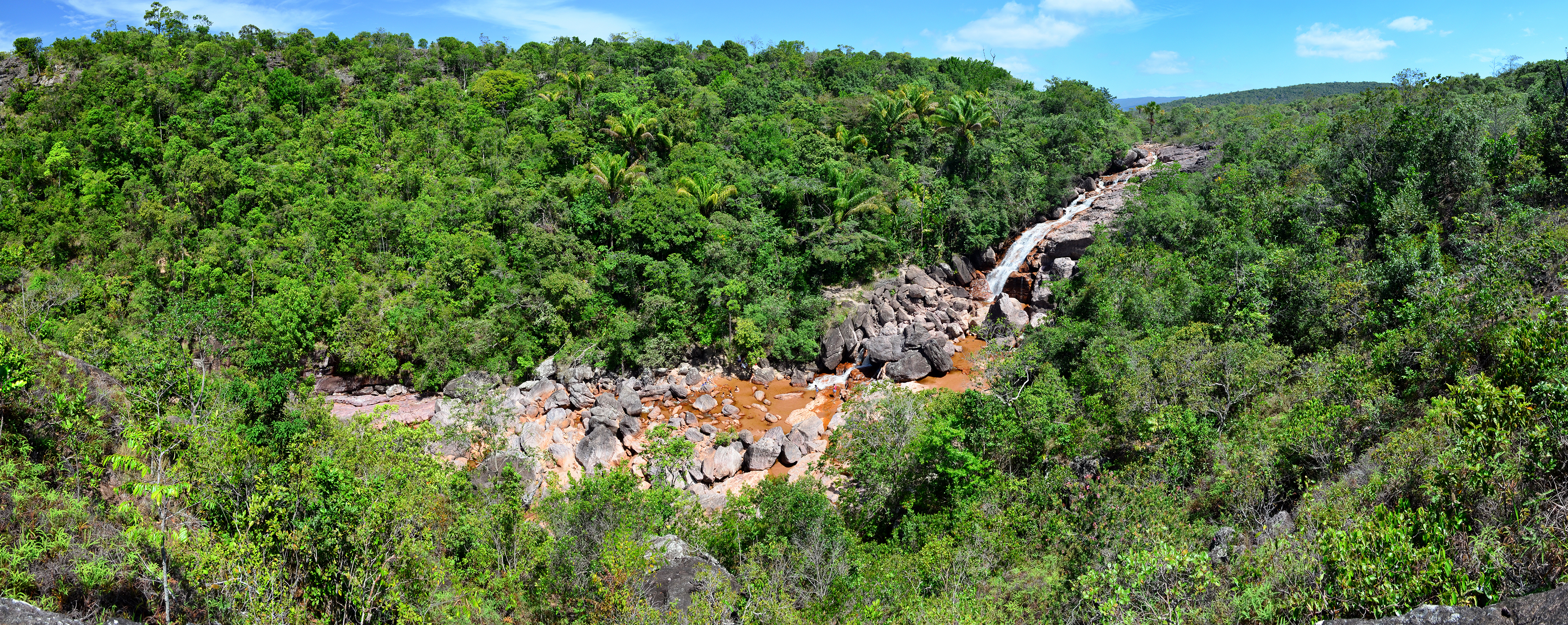
- Paiva waterfall

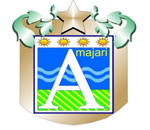
- Flag Coat of arms

- Location of Amajari in the State of Roraima
- Coordinates: 03°39′07″N 61°22′15″W
- Country: Brazil
- Region: North
- State: Roraima
- Founded: 17 October 1995

Government
  - Mayor: Vera Lúcia (PSC)

Area
  - Total: 28,472 km^{2} (10,993 sq mi)
- Elevation: 100 m (330 ft)

Population (2022)
  - Total: 13,927
  - Density: 0.21/km^{2} (0.54/sq mi)
- Time zone: UTC−4 (AMT)
- HDI (2000): 0.654 – medium
- Website: amajari.rr.gov.br

Amajari (Brazilian Portuguese pronunciation: [ɐmaʒaˈɾi]) is a municipality located in the northwest of the state of Roraima in Brazil. Its population is 13,185 and its area is 28,472 km^{2}. It is the westernmost municipality in Roraima.

The municipality of Amajari is a region of 8 indigenous segments with a total of 19 indigenous communities living there. The present ethnic groups are the Macuxi, Wapichana, Sapará and Taurepang people. The 8 indigenous segments: TI Araçá, TI Ouro, TI Anaro, TI Ponta da Serra, TI Aningal, TI Garagem, TI Santa Inês and TI Ananás. The indigenous communities that are located in the region are: Araçá, Mutamba, Mangueira, Três Corações, Guariba, Anaro, Ponta da Serra, Urucuri, Juraci, Nova União, Ouro, San Francisco, Cajueiro, Garagem, Ananás, Leão de Ouro, Santa Inês, Aningal and Vida Nova.

== Main townships ==
The following is a list of the main populated places within the municipality and their population according to the census of 2010.

- 1,219 inhabitants - Vila Brasil
- 116 inhabitants - Vila Tepequém
- 587 inhabitants - Vila Três Corações
- 693 inhabitants - Vila do Trairão

== Notable people ==
- Suely Campos (1953), politician and former governor of Roraima
