= Tepequém =

- Village
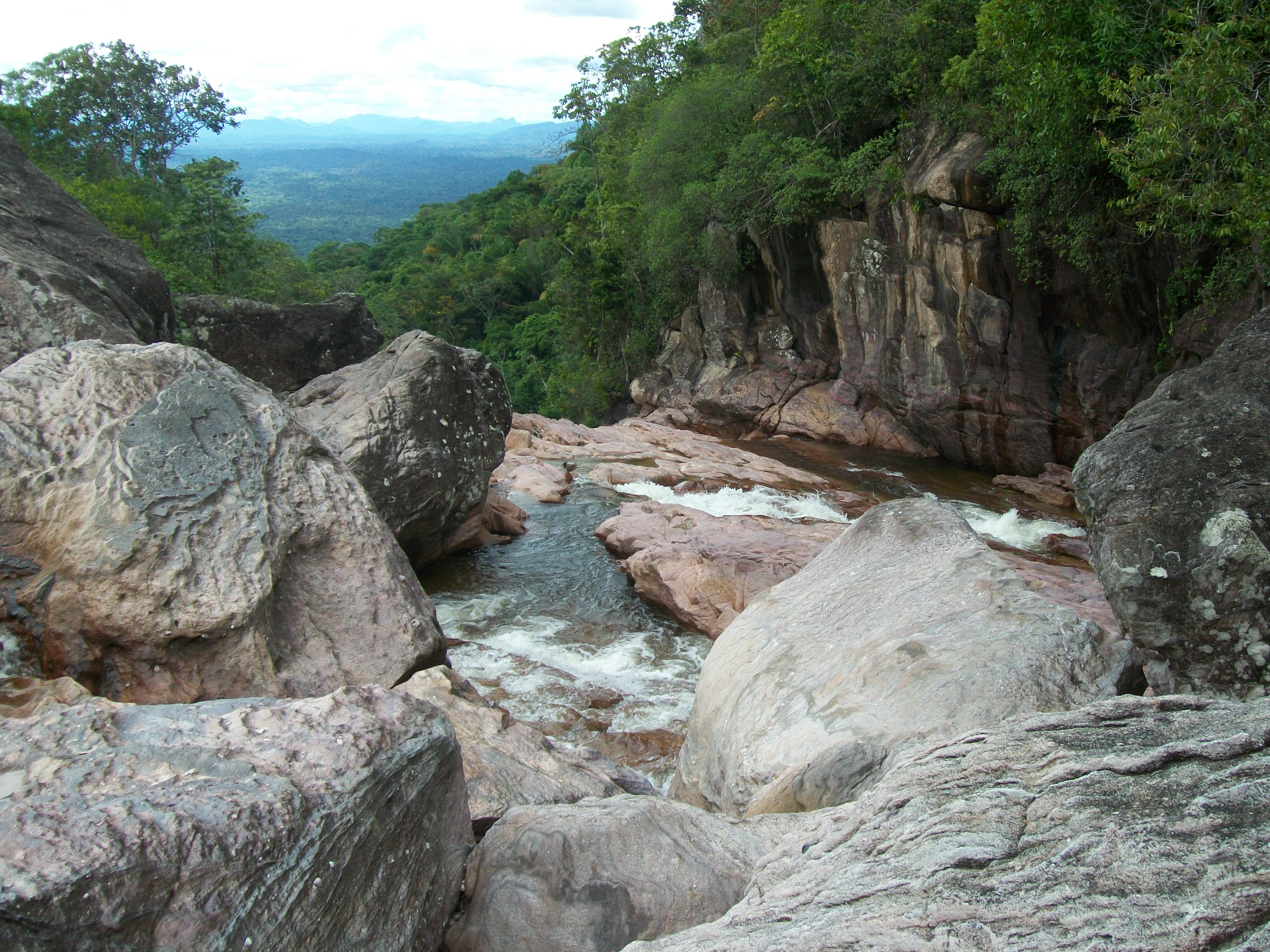
- Serro de Tepequém

- Location in Brazil
- Coordinates: 3°48′10″N 61°44′29″W
- Country: Brazil
- State: Roraima
- Municipality: Amajari

Population (2010)
  - Total: 116
- Postal code: 69343-000

Tepequém is a remote and sparsely populated (2010) village in eastern Amajari, Roraima, Brazil. Diamonds were discovered near the village in the 1930s. The village can be reached by road from the RR-203. The economy is based on tourism.

== Serro de Tepequém (Tepequém Mountain Range) ==
The village of Tepequém is surrounded by Serro de Tepequém. Serro de Tepequém is a tepui about 1,100 metres above sea level at its plateau, its highest point.
