= Telmário Mota =

Brazilian politician and journalist

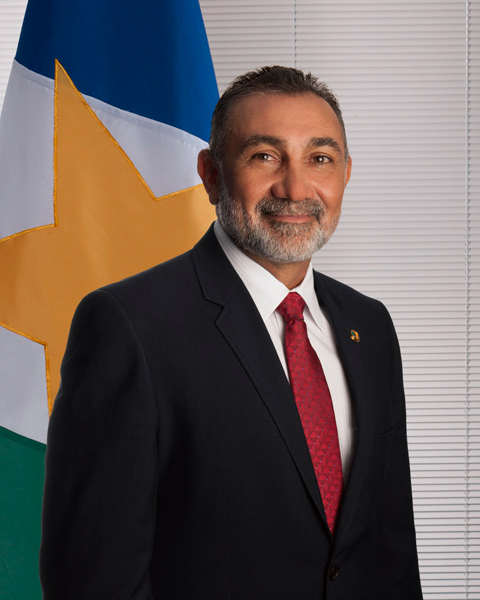

Senator for Roraima
- In office February 1, 2015 – February 1, 2023

Member of the Municipal Chamber of Boa Vista
- In office January 1, 2009 – January 1, 2013
- Constituency: At-large

Personal details
- Born: February 15, 1958 (age 68) Normandia, Roraima, Brazil
- Party: Solidariedade (2019-23)
- Other political affiliations: PSDC (1996–2005); PDT (2005–17); PTB (2017–19); PROS (2019); Solidariedade (2019-23)
- Profession: Accountant

Telmário Mota (born February 15, 1958) is a Brazilian politician and journalist. He had represented Roraima in the Federal Senate from 2015 to 2023. He is a member of the Republican Party of the Social Order (PROS).

Mota was arrested over murder of Antônia Araújo, his own daughter's mother, who was shot dead days before she was due to testify against him.
