= Soros (disambiguation) =

George Soros (born 1930) is a business magnate, investor, and philanthropist.

Soros may also refer to:

== People ==
- Alexander Soros (born 1985), son of George Soros, philanthropist
- Daisy Soros (born 1929), wife of Paul Soros, philanthropist and supporter of the arts
- Jonathan Soros (born 1970), son of George Soros, founder and chief executive officer of JS Capital Management LLC
- Paul Soros (1926–2013), brother of George Soros, and Henry Laurence Gantt Medal winner
- Susan Weber Soros (born 1954), founder and director of the Bard Graduate Center
- Tivadar Soros (1894–1968), Esperanto writer, father of George Soros

== Other uses ==
- Soros Fund Management, a financial services company founded by George Soros
- Soros Foundation, a network of national foundations which fund volunteer socio-political activity created by George Soros
- Soros: The Life, Times, and Trading Secrets of the World's Greatest Investor, 1996 biography of George Soros by Robert Slater
- Soros (Echinades)
