= Robert Soros =

American investor

- Born: Robert Daniel Soros; 1963 (age 62–63); New York City, U.S.
- Education: New York University (BA)
- Occupation: Investor
- Employers: Soros Fund Management; (1994–2017); Soros Capital Management; (2017–present)
- Spouse(s): Melissa Robin Schiff (m. 1992; div. 2014) Jamie Singer (m. 2020)
- Father: George Soros
- Relatives: Jonathan Soros (brother); Alexander Soros (half-brother); Tivadar Soros (grandfather); Paul Soros (uncle)

Robert Daniel Soros (born 1963) is an American investor and the founder of Soros Capital Management. The eldest son of billionaire investor George Soros, he was the deputy chairman and president of his father's firm, Soros Fund Management, until June 2017. He then formed Soros Capital Management, a family office based in New York. He graduated from New York University in 1986 with a degree in English literature.

== Early life and education ==
Robert Daniel Soros was born in 1963 in New York City, the eldest son of Annaliese and George Soros, a billionaire investor who founded Soros Fund Management. Robert attended Choate Rosemary Hall, a boarding school in Wallingford, Connecticut. He later graduated in 1986 with a degree in English literature from New York University.

== Career ==
Soros began his career working at his father's firm, Soros Fund Management. His first employment at the firm was brief and he left to work at a variety of other organizations, including the German bank Schröder, Münchmeyer, Hengst & Co. He returned to work at his father's firm in 1994.

In 2000, George Soros announced that he would be rolling back his involvement in his firm and appointed Robert Soros as interim chief executive. In October 2001, William Stack was appointed chief executive of Soros Fund Management to replace Robert Soros, who was named deputy chairman. In 2004, Soros was named chief investment officer (CIO) in addition to deputy chairman of the firm which at the time managed $12.8 billion in assets. Soros was in charge of the Quantum Endowment Fund, an investment portfolio managing $8.3 billion in assets. He held the CIO position for two years while continuing to make personal investments as well as trade stocks, bonds, currencies and commodities. Soros stopped trading for the firm in 2012 and continued to manage his own investments.

Soros Fund Management had $26 billion in assets under management by June 2017 when Soros stepped down as deputy chairman and president to start Soros Capital Management. A family office based in New York, his firm was a major backer of the Japanese deferred online payment service Paidy, which was acquired by PayPal for $2.7 billion in 2021.

== Personal life ==
On May 5, 1992, Soros married Melissa Robin Schiff at the Temple Emanu-El in New York City. They filed for divorce in 2014. In October 2020, Soros married Jamie Singer Soros, the CEO and founder of Ussie. She is 22 years his junior.

Soros is an avid competitive sailor.
