= Soros on Soros: Staying Ahead of the Curve =

1995 non-fiction book by George Soros

- First edition cover
- Author: George Soros
- Language: English
- Subject: Financial theory, personal history, and political analysis of George Soros
- Genre: Nonfiction
- Publisher: John Wiley and Sons
- Publication date: 1995
- Publication place: USA
- Media type: Print (hardback) and (paperback)
- Pages: 326
- ISBN: 0471119776

Soros on Soros: Staying Ahead of the Curve is a non-fiction book by George Soros, released by John Wiley and Sons in 1995, that gives an insight into the financial theory, personal history, and political analysis of George Soros. The narrative proceeds in an interview-like style with Byron Wien, Managing Director of Morgan Stanley, and German journalist Krisztina Koenen asking questions of Soros.

== Content ==
Soros describes his career in finance and provides his perspective on investing and global finance, politics, and what he views as the new world order. He follows his life from Holocaust survivor and student of philosophy and finance at the London School of Economics, to his emergence as one of the more successful and powerful traders of the twentieth century. Soros tells the story of Soros Fund Management and its $12 Billion dollar Quantum Fund, which for years produced a remarkable average annual return of 30%.

Soros describes "Black Wednesday", the time he made 1 billion dollars selling the British pound short, as well as the roughly $600 million he once lost speculating on the yen in February 1994. In simple terms, "Black Wednesday", was a formal devaluation of the British pound by around 20% against the dollar, the German Mark, and other currencies that took place on September 16, 1992. Soros, in the two weeks prior to September 16, on behalf of his hedge fund, and backed by both large bank loans and a multitude of the fund's co-investors, acquired and sold around ten billion British Pounds. Other private investors, not associated with Soros's funds, followed suit. After the pound dropped around 10-20% against the Mark, Soros, on behalf of his hedge fund, claimed to have made an estimated profit of around 1 billion dollars. Balancing the criticism by many British citizens and economists that this move damaged the English economy, Soros advocates noted that he had invested heavily in British securities during this period, and during the nationalization of industries imposed by Margaret Thatcher, Soros's funds were heavily invested in English industries including Jaguar automobiles and British Telecom. More specifically, Soros biographer Robert Slater estimated that Soros invested $500 million in British stocks shortly before "Black Wednesday" in the first few weeks of September 1992, based on the assumption that Great Britain's equities would rise following the devaluation of its currency.

=== Philanthropy ===
Perhaps most significantly, Soros explains the motivation he had in creating his philanthropic organizations, the Soros Foundation and his Open Society Institute. Through these organizations, Soros initially worked to begin Open Societies in the Soviet Union, and in Eastern European countries, many still under Communist rule. Among other efforts, Soros and the Open Society Foundations gave grants to further scientific research in Russia, spent close to $1 billion founding Central European University with multiple campuses in Eastern Europe, and worked to further freedom of speech. Soros's foundations and philanthropy extended to his native Hungary, then Poland, Czechoslovakia, Lithuania, and the Balkans. By the early 90's Soros's foundations were active in eighteen countries including Romania, Bulgaria, Yugoslavia, and the new states of Ukraine, Belarus, Moldova, Georgia, Kazakhstan, Uzbekistan, Kyrgyzstan, and Turkistan.

Most notably in Russia during a period of Glasnost which included more transparency with America and Western Europe in the 1990s, Mikhail Gorbachev recommended Soros for the Nobel Prize for giving grants of $100 million to Soviet scientists when the state had no money to pay them, giving $100 million to free the teachings of Humanities in Universities from their adherence to Marxism–Leninism, and most notably spending $100 million for all thirty-three regional Universities in Russia to connect to the Internet. Soros, on behalf of his foundations, spent millions to combat a virulent strain of drug-resistant tuberculosis that was advancing in Russia, most notably in its prisons.

== Critics of Soros's philanthropy ==
As Soros has admitted, at times a small portion of his contributions may have been pocketed by their recipients or used privately by those who should have been administering his foundations, and others have found his positive changes to be cut short when a new Presidential administration or opposing political movement gains power. In China in 1989, though he made efforts to support economic growth and back anti-Communist dissidents, the Open Society Foundation was forced to close due to the rigidity of its Communist bureaucracy and opposition from leaders such as Chairman Deng Xiaoping who associated the group with a competing political faction. In China in 1987, as in several other Communist nations, Soros's Open Society Foundation was erroneously suspected of being tied to efforts of America's Central Intelligence Agency to undermine Communism or export China's technological secrets.

=== International opposition ===
Soros's has faced considerable opposition in several of the Eastern European and Asian countries where his Open Foundations are based. Michael Kaufman, a noted, if not entirely objective biographer of Soros, has written that most of Soros's strongest European and Asian opponents were at one point identified as autocrats, and often were dictatorial leaders who stifled the opposition press. As Kaufman noted, Soros has "in fact crossed rhetorical swords with a sizable portion of the world's autocrats, dictators, and despots". Among the leaders who have criticized Soros's philanthropic efforts in their country are Slobodan Milosevic in Yugoslavia, Franjo Tudjman in Croatia, Aleksandr Lukashenko in Belarus, Vladimir Meciar in Slovakia, and most strongly Mahathir Mohamad in Malaysia.

=== Sources of opposition in America ===
In the United States, Soros has come under attack frequently by leaders of the country's "war on drugs", who abhor his attempts to deal with narcotics as a public health rather than a criminal problem and have attacked him for supporting referendums in five states to legalize the use of marijuana for medicinal purposes. More recent opposition has been by critics who believe his foundations have provided funding to support the campaigns of judges and attorney generals they consider soft on crime. According to Robert Slater writing around 2009, "since 1993, Soros has donated $15 million to foundations and groups that advocated altering America's drug policies", though the current figure may be larger. He has also faced considerable criticism from conservative websites, commentators, and occasionally politicians who question his motives in donating roughly $27 million to the Democratic opposition in the 2004 Presidential election of George Bush. Soros's total philanthropic donations during 2004 were close to $1 billion, and his opposition to Bush's re-election, was not central to his philanthropic agenda. Soros's frequent statements against America's War in Iraq and his concern over the civil liberties strained by the Patriot Act during George Bush's administration opened him to additional criticism. In fact, with the frequency of his appearances and statements, Soros's opposition to Bush's 2008 campaign could be said to have been a campaign in itself.

In the book, Soros also provides valuable analysis of affairs in Russia and the nations of the communist bloc and describes the reasons why, in his estimation, America and Western Europe have been unable to successfully aid their evolution into modern nations of the free world. He also discusses issues with the Global Exchange Rate Mechanism (ERM), particularly the resulting late twentieth century European ERM crisis related to "Black Wednesday", and looks into the potential gains and pitfalls of investing in emerging markets.

== Critical reviews ==
Former Secretary of State Henry Kissinger said of the book, "If you have ever wanted to sit down for a candid conversation with a phenomenal financial success, George Soros's book provides the opportunity. You will meet a complex man and a first-rate mind."

Foreign relations expert Zbigniew Brzezinski, praised Soros's book and his philanthropic efforts, noting Soros "has translated a remarkable personal financial success into a truly generous and historically significant effort to promote postcommunist democracy".

Paul A. Volcker also praised the book, but focused on Soros's philanthropic efforts, writing, "What really drives the man now, with a personal fortune beyond all personal need, is a different kind of strategic investing--investment to build in Eastern Europe the kind of open societies he came to value in his own life".

The Wiley website has written that Soros on Soros "is a must read for anyone interested in world finance and international policy.", and an insight into what makes one of the "greatest financial wizards of this or any age tick".

Alex Barrow, writing for the Macro Ops Financial website has noted Soros's greatest single insight into his investment strategy is that he doesn't have a particular style of investing, or more specifically he changes his style to fit the conditions of a particular market and era. He considers Soros on Soros a scaled down version of Soros's Alchemy of Finance, which he considers a valuable but somewhat difficult read. Barrow importantly notes that in general Soros's "prose is sorely lacking. As a result, his brilliance comes across slightly muddled and his ideas too abstruse for many to grasp", although Barrow writes that due to its brevity and interview-like style, Soros on Soros suffers less from this problem.
