= Alexander Soros =

American investor and philanthropist (born 1985)

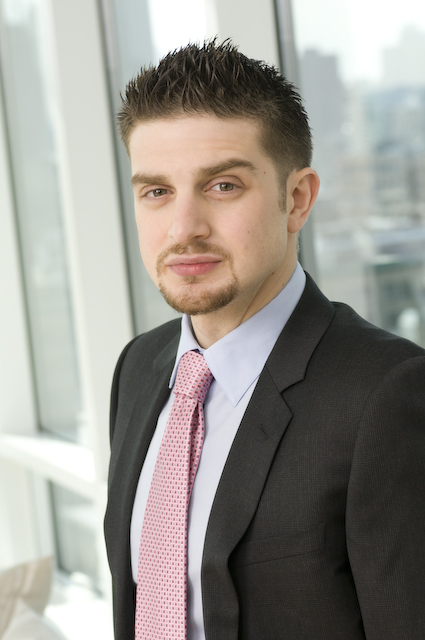
- Soros in 2012
- Born: October 27, 1985 (age 41); New York City, U.S.
- Education: New York University (BA); University of California, Berkeley (MA, PhD)
- Occupations: Investor; chairman; philanthropist
- Title: Chair of the Open Society Foundations
- Spouse: Huma Abedin (m. 2025)
- Parent(s): George Soros; Susan Weber
- Relatives: Robert Soros (half-brother); Jonathan Soros (half-brother); Tivadar Soros (grandfather); Paul Soros (uncle)

Alexander Soros (born October 27, 1985) is an American investor and philanthropist. One of the five children of billionaire George Soros, he chairs the Board of Directors of the Open Society Foundations and sits on the investment committee for Soros Fund Management. He was also named one of the World Economic Forum's Young Global Leaders of 2018.

== Early life and education ==
Alexander Soros—one of two sons of Susan Weber Soros and billionaire George Soros—was raised with his younger brother, Gregory, in Katonah, New York. Alexander attended the King Low-Heywood Thomas school (now known as the King School), in Stamford, Connecticut, then graduated from New York University in 2009, and earned a PhD in history from the University of California, Berkeley in 2018.

On June 11, 2023, The Wall Street Journal reported that George Soros had handed control of his $25 billion Soros Open Society Foundation to his son Alexander. Shortly after, the foundation announced layoffs of at least 40 percent of its international staff of then 800 and "significant changes" to its operating model.

== Philanthropy ==
Soros manages the Soros Family Foundation and the Open Society Foundation, which distributes around US$1.5 billion a year to advance human rights and democratic governments. Soros established himself as a philanthropist with his first major contribution to Bend the Arc in 2011.

According to a 2011 profile in The Wall Street Journal, Soros's focus is on "progressive causes." Since then, he has joined the board of directors of organizations including Global Witness (as an advisory board member), which campaigns against environmental and human rights abuses associated with the exploitation of natural resources. In March 2012, he donated $200,000 to the Jewish Council for Education and Research, the organization behind 2008's "Great Schlep" in support of then-candidate Barack Obama.

=== Alexander Soros Foundation ===
In 2012, Soros established the Alexander Soros Foundation, which is dedicated to promoting social justice and human rights. Among the foundation's initial grantees are Bend the Arc, the National Domestic Workers Alliance, which represents the rights of 2.5 million domestic workers in the U.S., and Make the Road New York, a social justice organization for Latino and working class communities in the New York metropolitan area.

Alongside the Ford Foundation and the Open Society Foundations, the Alexander Soros Foundation funded the first U.S. national statistical study of domestic workers ("Home Economics: The Invisible and Unregulated World of Domestic Work," released November 26, 2012).

==== ASF awards ====
- In July 2012, the Alexander Soros Foundation presented its inaugural ASF Award for Environmental and Human Rights Activism to Liberian activist Silas Siakor.
- In 2013, the prize went to Chut Wutty, the Cambodian activist who died defending the Prey Lang forest.
- In 2014, the prize was awarded posthumously to Edwin Chota, Jorge Ríos Pérez, Leoncio Quincima Meléndez and Francisco Pinedo, a group of indigenous leaders from Peru who were murdered because of their work trying to end illegal logging in their community in Peru's rainforest.
- In 2015, the prize went to Alphonse Muhindo Valivambene and Bantu Lukambo for their dedication to defending Virunga National Park against corrupt interests attempting to open the park to illegal oil drilling and poaching.
- In 2016, the prize went to Paul Pavol, a villager from Papua New Guinea who is speaking out against the appropriation of rainforest in his home district of Pomio by Malaysian logging conglomerate Rimbunan Hijau.
- In 2017, Antônia Melo da Silva, a longtime Brazilian environmental activist, received the Alexander Soros Foundation Award for Environmental and Human Rights Activism for her inspiring role leading campaigns to stop the construction of the Belo Monte Dam and other infrastructure projects in the Amazon rainforest.

== Investment career ==
Soros is the only family member sitting on the investment committee for Soros Fund Management, the vehicle which The Wall Street Journal says is managing the $25bn for the family and the charitable foundation.

== Other activities ==
Soros is credited as a producer of several movies, including Trial by Fire and The Kleptocrats. Soros is a visiting assistant professor of political studies at Bard College, where he has been a postdoctoral fellow at the Hannah Arendt Center for Politics and Humanities. Additionally, Soros is a member of the board of trustees at Bard.

In 2026, Soros has pledged to funnel $30 billion to fight antisemitism and also combat anti-Muslim hate by funding various justice organizations in the United States.

== Publications ==
In 2014, Soros contributed an essay to the book God, Faith and Identity from the Ashes: Reflections of Children and Grandchildren of Holocaust Survivors.

Soros's writing has appeared in The Guardian, Politico, The Miami Herald, The Sun-Sentinel, and The Forward.

== Personal life ==
Soros lives in NoHo, Manhattan. He had been dating Huma Abedin since at least May 2024, when they appeared together at the Met Gala. He married Abedin on June 14, 2025, after an eleven-month engagement. Guests in attendance at the wedding included various Democratic political leaders, Hollywood celebrities and other high-profile individuals such as Anna Wintour.
