= Soro =

Soro may refer to:

== Places ==
- Soro, Denmark, a town in Denmark
- Soro, East Timor, a suco in Ainaro Municipality, East Timor
- Soro (woreda), Hadiya Zone, Ethiopia
- Soro, Balasore, a town in Odisha, India
  - Soro (Odisha Vidhan Sabha constituency), an assembly constituency in Balasore district, Odisha, India
- Soro, a village in Ganjuwa, Bauchi State, Nigeria

== Other uses ==
- Soro (album), a 1987 album by Salif Keita
- Soro (fiction), a fictional extraterrestrial race in David Brin's Uplift Universe

== See also ==
- Soros (disambiguation)
