= Jonathan Soros =

American businessman (born 1970)

- Born: Jonathan Tivadar Soros; September 10, 1970 (age 56)
- Education: Wesleyan University (BA); Harvard University (JD, MPP)
- Occupation: Investment fund manager
- Spouse: Jennifer Allan (m. 1997)
- Parent(s): George Soros; Annaliese Witschak
- Relatives: Robert Soros (brother); Alexander Soros (half-brother); Tivadar Soros (grandfather); Paul Soros (uncle)

Jonathan Tivadar Soros (born September 10, 1970) is an American businessman who is co-founder and partner of One Madison Group, a private investment firm. He previously was chief executive officer of JS Capital Management LLC and co-deputy chairman of Soros Fund Management.

He has been a prominent donor to Democratic and progressive political causes. Soros started the Friends of Democracy PAC, now merged into Every Voice, to push for campaign finance reform and the abolition of the electoral college.

== Early life and education ==
Soros's parents are Annaliese Witschak and business magnate George Soros, who divorced in 1981. He is the brother of Andrea and Robert Soros and half-brother of Gregory and Alexander, from his father's second marriage to Susan Weber.

He received a Bachelor of Arts from Wesleyan University in Middletown, Connecticut, in 1992. He then received a Juris Doctor from Harvard Law School and a Master of Public Policy from Harvard Kennedy School.

== Career ==
=== Early career ===
Soros worked for a federal judge as a law clerk before joining Soros Fund Management.

=== Soros Fund ===
Soros worked at Soros Fund Management beginning in 2002 and in 2004, he and his brother, Robert, became co-deputy chairmen of the organization that managed $12.8 billion in funds at that time. Their father stepped down at that time, but remained as chairman.

He focused on operations and was the organization's chief investment officer until he stepped down in 2011. His father said that Jonathan was "the principal architect of our transition to a healthy and stable investment operation" out of a turbulent financial period. However, that year, the organization had incurred "significant losses" and had converted to a family office—managing the funds of George, his foundation, and Soros family members— and no longer operating as a hedge fund. In the process, its investors received $1 billion from the fund. Reuters states that the move was made to avoid a deadline to register at the U.S. Securities and Exchange Commission as an investment manager. Jonathan remained on the board of his father's foundation.

=== JS Capital Management ===
Soros was the founder and chief executive officer of JS Capital Management LLC, a private investment firm, located in midtown Manhattan near Central Park. The second quarter 2015 filings showed that the U.S. assets in its portfolio were valued at $500 million, up from $394.76 million the previous quarter. (Note: In 2015, it invested in Yepme.com, run by VAS Data Services. According to the Registrar of Companies (RoC), it and TCS Capital invested ₹30 crore (US$3.1 million) in the online fashion retailer, largely men's wear. It invested in HRG Group, and sold 1.18 million shares in the third quarter of 2016, which reduced its stake in the company by 60%. By the end of that quarter, it held 774,582 shares, valued at $12.16M.) In 2015, Bloomberg Politics identified him as one of the hedge fund titans. JS Capital Management is now doing business as One Madison Group.

=== One Madison Group ===
In 2016 JS Capital partnered with One Madison Corporation, a private investment firm, to form a special purpose acquisition company that purchased Ranpak Holdings Corp. In 2024, JS Capital combined with One Madison Group. Soros and JS Capital's CIO, Salil Seshadri joined One Madison Group's CEO Omar Asali as co-founders and partners.

In 2020, Soros and Jon Patricof co-founded Athletes Unlimited, which operates professional women's sports leagues.

== Political advocacy ==
=== Campaign reform ===
He advocates for the removal of the electoral college, which he says is undemocratic and unconstitutional. This is the position of the Every Voice political advocacy group and the National Popular Vote Interstate Compact that advocates for electoral votes to be given to each state based upon certified results of the popular vote.

Imagine for a moment that you hail from one of the most famous families in international finance. Your father is worth $20 billion. And on account of his largesse, your last name is as synonymous with Democratic politics as Roosevelt or Kennedy.

Seeking your generosity, candidates come to you, hat in hand. Your concerns, they tell you, will be their concerns—so long as you contribute at their next fundraiser. And then, in your early 40s, you decide that this whole system is messed up. That it is you, and people like you, the rarest of the one percenters, who have warped our politics.

— David Freedlander

In July 2012, Soros started and funded Friends of Democracy PAC (now merged into Every Voice), a hybrid political action committee and super PAC designed to push for campaign finance reform that would mandate a public financing system for all federal elections. Soros's organization was described as an "anti-super PAC super PAC" by The Washington Post. Founded with Ilyse Hogue, (Note: In 2016, Hogue has been identified as a contender to head the Democratic National Committee. Soros said that "she has a clear sense of what she's after in terms of progressive outcomes" and noted the importance of the party having clear objectives in the years following the 2016 presidential election, which may see the removal of existing liberal legislation that "could take years, decades to rebuild.") formerly with Media Matters for America and MoveOn.org, and David Donnelly, executive director of the Public Campaign Action Fund, the goal of the organization is to elect candidates that support campaign reform, including public matching funds for elections.

Its strategy is to identify 10 to 15 districts where incumbent senators or congressmen have not supported "citizen-led" elections, and use multiple forms of media—like television ads, direct mail, phone calls, internet ads—to communicate the lawmaker's position on campaign funding. For instance, Soros, the organization's largest contributor, helped fund the 2012 election of Cecilia Tkaczyk, who supports changes to funding for state elections by implementing a system of public financing. She won by a small margin, in a district that historically elected Republicans.

By 2014, he gave $2 million over a few years to support initiatives and candidates, and a total of $3.7 million was spent by Soros for Democratic candidates by October of that year. Seven of the eight candidates that the PAC chose to back were elected in 2014. He is a member of Democracy Alliance, an organization that funds Democratic campaigns. The American Prospect said of him, "Jonathan Soros has emerged in recent years as a savvy donor and operative, much more hands-on than his father, George, the billionaire investor and Democratic donor."

He backed two state legislative initiatives in 2016 to reform campaign financing, one in the state of Washington and the other in South Dakota. Washington Initiative 1464 would have provided $150 for each voter to contribute towards a candidate of their choice and limited contributions by government contractors and lobbyists. It did not pass. However, South Dakota's Government Accountability and Anti-Corruption Act was successful.

=== Other groups ===
Soros has worked with MoveOn.org and other political advocacy groups. He is a senior fellow at the Roosevelt Institute and a member of the board of directors of the New America Foundation and the Open Society Foundations. He is a donor to the Democracy Alliance.

He supports the New York Leadership for Accountable Government, formed about 2012. By March 2013, he supported small donor democracy, in which small-dollar campaign contributions are multiple-matched to increase participation by citizens and donor diversity. (Note: He spoke at a small donor democracy event hosted by Committee for Economic Development (CED), League of Women Voters, Americans for Campaign Reform, NY LEAD, and the Brennan Center for Justice that month.)

He contributed to Hillary Clinton and Martin O'Malley's presidential campaigns in 2015. In 2016, he donated $1 million to the Planned Parenthood Super PAC, which supported the Hillary Clinton presidential campaign.

== Personal life ==
Soros married Jennifer Allan in 1997, who was then a social worker. They met while working for the 1992 Clinton-Gore presidential campaign. Beginning in 2000, they lived in a townhouse in the West Village of Manhattan. He and Jennifer have three children.

== See also ==
- George Soros
- Open Society Foundations
- Tides Foundation
