= Ilyse Hogue =

American progressive activist (born 1969)

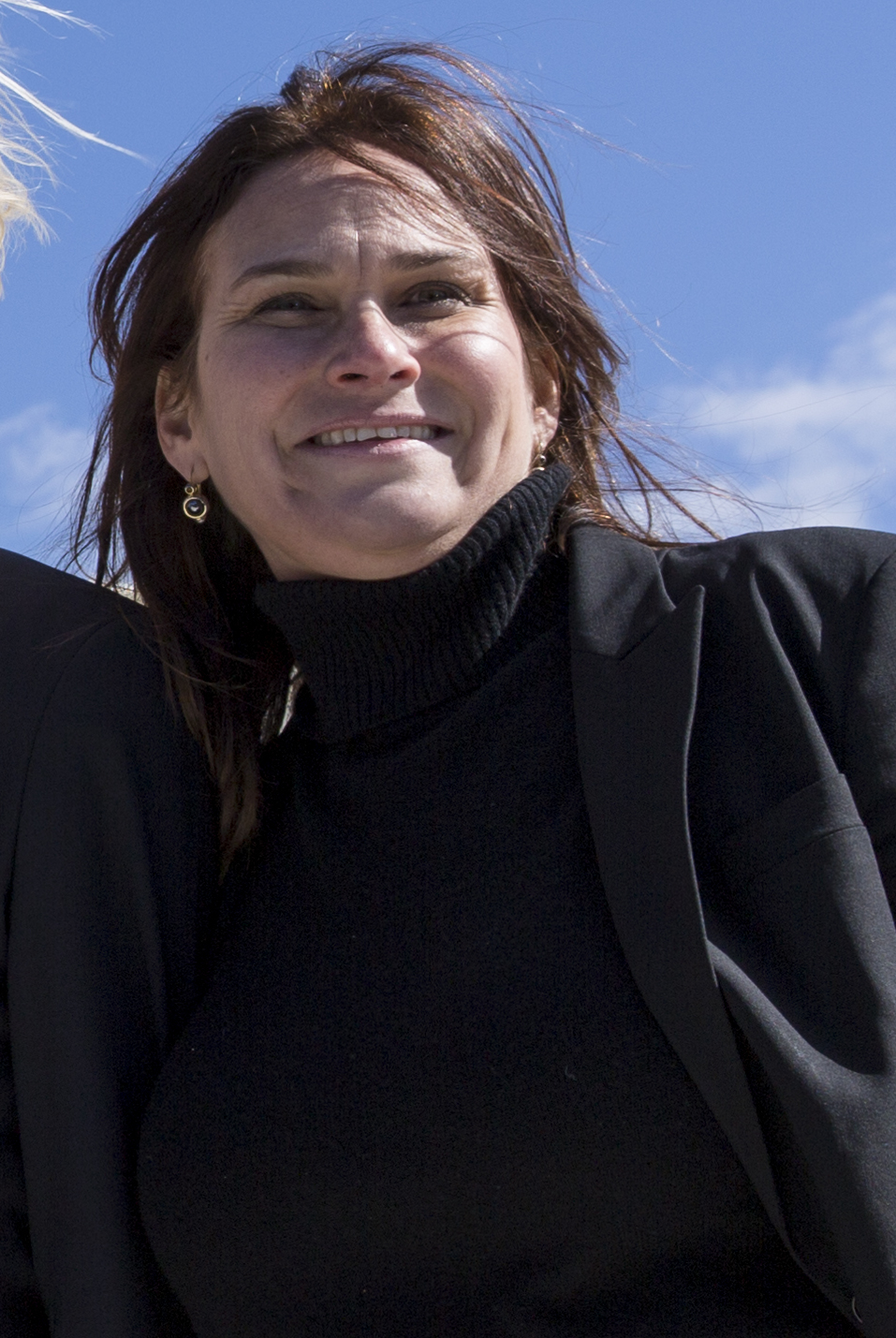
- Born: August 26, 1969 (age 56); Dallas, Texas, U.S.
- Education: Vassar College (AB); University of Michigan, Ann; Arbor (MS)
- Known for: President of NARAL; Pro-Choice America
- Political party: Democratic

Ilyse Hogue (born August 26, 1969) is an American progressive activist who served as president of NARAL Pro-Choice America, a reproductive rights lobbying and advocacy organization, from 2013 to 2021. In September 2021, she became president of Purpose, a social impact organization.

== Early years ==
Hogue was born in Dallas, Texas, in August 1969. Her family is Jewish. She graduated from high school at Greenhill School in Addison, Texas, before attending Vassar College in Poughkeepsie, New York, where she studied environmental science. She attended graduate school at the University of Michigan and later worked as a research assistant at the University of Montana. At Vassar, she engaged in her first political work in April 1989 when she joined the March for Women's Lives, a demonstration focused on reproductive rights.

== Career ==
Hogue joined NARAL in January 2013. When assuming the role of president, some commentators remarked on her relative youth compared to her sexagenarian predecessor (she was 43 at the time) as an intentional choice on the part of NARAL as it sought to bring a more aggressive approach to defending abortion rights and courting younger supporters.

One of her first moves as president was to build coalitions within the progressive movement with groups that traditionally had little to do with reproductive rights. She also brought an increased focus on ballot measures, partly in an attempt to force opponents to define what they are in favor of while giving Americans who support abortion rights a platform.

Following a shooting which occurred at a Planned Parenthood clinic in Colorado in 2015, The Huffington Post reported on a Facebook post of Hogue's in which she was critical of the rhetoric of anti-abortion activists including David Daleiden and Troy Newman.

Prior to her work for NARAL, Hogue worked for MoveOn.org, Greenpeace, Rainforest Action Network, Media Matters for America, and the Friends of Democracy PAC, a campaign-finance reform group founded by Jonathan Soros. She served on the board of Bend the Arc: A Jewish Partnership for Justice, a Jewish social organization.

On November 15, 2016, Hogue announced she was considering running in the Democratic National Committee chairmanship election, 2017. She ultimately decided not to enter the race.

After eight years serving as president of NARAL, Hogue stepped down from her position on May 28, 2021. In September 2021, she became president of Purpose, a social impact organization.

== Personal life ==
She is married to John Neffinger, with whom she had twins in 2015.
