= Stanley Druckenmiller =

American investor and philanthropist (born 1953)

- Born: Stanley Freeman Druckenmiller; June 14, 1953 (age 73); Pittsburgh, Pennsylvania, U.S.
- Education: Bowdoin College (BA); University of Michigan
- Occupations: Investor, hedge fund manager and philanthropist
- Known for: Founding and managing Duquesne Capital; Managing the Quantum Fund with George Soros

Stanley Freeman Druckenmiller (born June 14, 1953) is an American billionaire investor, philanthropist and former hedge fund manager. He is the former chairman and president of Duquesne Capital, which he founded in 1981. He closed the fund in August 2010, at which time it had over $12 billion in assets. From 1988 to 2000, he managed money for George Soros as the lead portfolio manager for Quantum Fund. He is reported to have made $260 million in 2008.

== Early life and education ==
Druckenmiller was born in Pittsburgh, Pennsylvania, the son of Anne White and Stanley Thomas Druckenmiller, a chemical engineer. He grew up in a middle-class household in the suburbs of Philadelphia. His parents divorced when he was in elementary school, and Stanley went to live with his father in Gibbstown, New Jersey, then Richmond, Virginia; his sisters, Helen and Salley stayed with their mother in Philadelphia.

Druckenmiller is a graduate of Collegiate School, Richmond, Virginia. In 1975, he received a BA in English and economics from Bowdoin College (where he opened a hot dog stand with Lawrence B. Lindsey, who later became economic policy adviser to President George W. Bush). He dropped out of a Ph.D. program in economics at the University of Michigan in the middle of the second semester to accept a position as an oil analyst for Pittsburgh National Bank.

== Investment career ==
Druckenmiller began his financial career in 1977 as a management trainee at Pittsburgh National Bank. He became head of the bank's equity research group after one year. In 1981, he founded his own firm, Duquesne Capital Management.

In 1985, he became a consultant to Dreyfus, splitting his time between Pittsburgh and New York City, where he lived two days each week. He moved to New York full-time in 1986, when he was named head of the Dreyfus Fund. As part of his agreement with Dreyfus, he also maintained management of Duquesne. In 1988, he was hired by George Soros to replace Victor Niederhoffer at Quantum Fund. He and Soros famously "broke the Bank of England" when they shorted British pound sterling in 1992, reputedly making more than $1 billion in profits, in an event known as Black Wednesday. They calculated that the Bank of England did not have enough foreign currency reserves with which to buy enough sterling to prop up the currency and that raising interest rates would be politically unsustainable. He left Soros in 2000 after taking large losses in technology stocks.

Since then, he has concentrated full-time on Duquesne Capital. He is profiled in the book The New Market Wizards by Jack D. Schwager. According to Bloomberg News, on August 18, 2010, Druckenmiller announced the closing of his hedge fund "telling investors he'd been worn down by the stress of trying to maintain one of the best trading records in the industry while managing an 'enormous amount of capital.'" Duquesne Capital Management posts an average annual return of 30 percent without any money-losing year. His funds were down for about 5 percent when he announced his retirement in August. However, they had since erased the losses and closed with a small gain through successful bets that the market would rally in anticipation that the Federal Reserve would announce further "Quantitative Easing" to assist in reducing unemployment and avoid deflation.

According to The Wall Street Journal, on August 18, 2010, Druckenmiller "told clients that he's returning their money and ending his firm's 30-year run, citing the 'high emotional toll' of not performing up to his own expectations." He indicated it was not easy to make big profits while handling very large sums of money. His biggest investments are Microsoft and Amazon in 2020.

In October 2024, Druckenmiller alongside Greg Coffey, invested in an AI company Reflexivity in their most recent round to raise 30 million dollars.

=== Investment philosophy ===
Druckenmiller is a top-down investor who adopts a similar trading style as George Soros by holding a group of stocks long, a group of stocks short, and uses leverage to trade futures and currency. In early 2019 he held large positions in Microsoft, Abbott Laboratories, Salesforce.com, Delta Air Lines, and American Airlines.

== Economic and political views ==
In 2020, after the stock market crash and subsequent rally above pre-crash levels, Druckenmiller said he expects inflation in the US economy due to actions taken by the Federal Reserve. He made a similar warning in 2013 during an address at Bowdoin College in which he noted that, since 1994, he has been concerned that spending on government entitlement programs would lead to an economic crisis worse than the financial collapse of 2008. He advocates reducing government spending on social safety net programs such as Social Security.

Druckenmiller was a major supporter of Republican Governor Chris Christie of New Jersey. In 2015, Druckenmiller donated $300,000 total to the presidential candidacies of Christie, Jeb Bush, and John Kasich. In 2023, he endorsed Nikki Haley in the 2024 Republican Party presidential primaries. The following year, Druckenmiller stated that he would be voting for neither Donald Trump nor Kamala Harris in the 2024 United States presidential election.

== Wealth and philanthropy ==
In 2009, Druckenmiller donated $705 million to foundations that support medical research, education, and anti-poverty, including a $100 million gift to found a Neuroscience Institute at the NYU School of Medicine. In 2010, Stanley Druckenmiller announced that he will close his Duquesne Capital hedge fund in order to spend more time on philanthropy, according to Bloomberg.com. Druckenmiller gave $700 million to his foundation last year and will apparently ramp that up in coming years.

Druckenmiller is also Chairman of the Board of Harlem Children's Zone, a multi-faceted, community-based project. Harlem Children's Zone was founded by Druckenmiller's college friend and fellow Bowdoin College alumnus Geoffrey Canada. In 2006, Druckenmiller gave $25 million to the organization. In 2013, Druckenmiller and Canada toured college campuses urging reform in taxation, health care, and Social Security to ensure intergenerational equity.

Druckenmiller and his wife are also principal sponsors of the New York City AIDS walk. The Stanley F. Druckenmiller Hall, built in 1997 at Bowdoin College, is named after Druckenmiller's grandfather and was dedicated to Bowdoin by Druckenmiller himself.

=== Pittsburgh Steelers ===
In July 2008, Druckenmiller emerged as a potential investor in the Pittsburgh Steelers franchise of the National Football League. The five sons of Steelers founder Art Rooney Sr. were working to restructure ownership of the team, and Druckenmiller was contacted by a member or representative of the Rooney family about buying the shares of several of the Rooney brothers. On September 18, Druckenmiller withdrew his bid to purchase the team.

Former Steelers President Dan Rooney stated that he has no ill will toward Druckenmiller, mentioning that he hopes the financier remains a great Steelers fan. NFL owners unanimously approved the restructuring of ownership on December 17, 2008, with Dan & Art II getting the mandated 30% stake.

== AI Controversy ==
On August 24, 2026, the Wall Street Journal published an op-ed that Druckenmiller claimed to have written. This piece was later uncovered to have been written completely by artificial intelligence. When confronted, Druckenmiller confessed, stating he was "‘proud of using it" and "not embarrassed" or "ashamed."

== Personal life ==
Druckenmiller has been married twice. In 1976, he married his high school sweetheart; they divorced in 1980. In 1988, Druckenmiller married Fiona Katharine Biggs, a Barnard College graduate and niece of investor Barton Biggs, in an Episcopalian ceremony. Druckenmiller has three daughters with Biggs.
