= Dawn Fitzpatrick =

American investment banker

- Education: University of Pennsylvania (BS)
- Occupations: Chief investment officer, Soros Fund Management
- Children: 3

Dawn Fitzpatrick is an American investment banker and hedge fund manager. She is the chief executive officer (CEO) and chief investment officer (CIO) at Soros Fund Management.

== Early years ==
Fitzpatrick "is a second-generation Irish American with ancestors hailing from Kilkenny and Cork on her father's and mother's side", and is a native of New York. She earned a bachelor's degree from the University of Pennsylvania's Wharton School of Business. While at UPenn Fitzpatrick ran track. She is divorced with three children.

== Career ==
Fitzpatrick started working at O'Connor & Associates in 1992 and went on to become the global head and CIO of O'Connor within the alternative and quantitative investments area. In August 2013, when O'Connor became a standalone business area within UBS Global Asset Management, Fitzpatrick was promoted to global head and chief investment officer (CIO) at O'Connor.

In January 2016, Fitzpatrick became the Global Head of Equities, Multi-Asset and O'Connor at UBS Asset Management, responsible for overseeing more than $500 billion in assets. In January 2017, she became Head of Investments within UBS Asset Management. She was also a member of the UBS Asset Management Executive Committee.

In April 2017, Fitzpatrick became the Chief Investment Officer of Soros Fund Management. She is on the Open Society Foundations' Economic Justice Program advisory board, the Federal Reserve Bank of New York's Investor Advisory Committee on Financial Markets, as a non-executive Director on the Barclays board, and sits on the Advisory Council of The Bretton Woods Committee.

Fitzpatrick was named one of Business Insider's most powerful women on Wall Street in 2013. In 2015, American Banker put her on their list of the 25 most powerful women in finance and The Hedge Fund Journal put her on the list of 50 leading women in hedge funds. In 2018 and 2019, Fitzpatrick was on the Worth Power 100, a list of "the 100 most powerful men and women in global finance." In 2020 and 2021, Barron's listed her as one of the "100 Most Influential Women in U.S. Finance", and the University of Pennsylvania Wharton Club of New York presented Fitzpatrick with the 2020 Joseph Wharton Award for Leadership "for the Wharton alumnus who embodies the highest standards of leadership in both business and society."
