= Daisy Soros =

Hungarian-born American philanthropist and supporter of the arts (born 1929)

- Born: Daisy Margaret Schlenger; September 7, 1929 (age 97); Bratislava, Slovakia
- Citizenship: American
- Occupation: Philanthropist
- Organization: The Paul & Daisy Soros Fellowships for New Americans
- Spouse: Paul Soros (m. 1951; died 2013)
- Children: 4
- Relatives: George Soros (brother-in-law)

Daisy Margaret Soros (née Schlenger; September 7, 1929) is an American philanthropist and supporter of the arts. She is the chairperson of the Paul & Daisy Soros Fellowship for New Americans, a fellowship program that supports graduate studies for 30 new Americans each year for two years. She was married to the late Paul Soros, founder of Soros Associates and older brother of financier George Soros.

== Early life and education ==
Daisy Margaret Schlenger was born in Bratislava (in modern-day Slovakia) on September 7, 1929, but was raised in Austria and Hungary. Her parents were Paul (in Hungarian, Pál) Schlenger and Piroska Erzsebet "Piri" Schlenger (née Stein).

After graduating from the Lutheran Gymnasium in Budapest, she received her diploma from École hôtelière de Lausanne in Switzerland. She came to the United States on a student visa as a Hungarian citizen, enrolling at Columbia University School of General Studies. She later attended the New York School of Interior Design, and NYU's School of Social Work, and worked extensively as a counselor to terminally ill patients and their families.

== Philanthropy ==
Soros has been involved with various charitable organizations for decades. In 1993, she became a member of the Board of Overseers of Weill Cornell Medical College. In an effort to promote the mission and ideals of academic medicine, she founded the Information Please luncheon lecture series which continues. She is a member of the Board of Fellows for the Discoveries that Make a Difference Campaign, which raised $1.3 billion for the Weill Cornell Medical School. She is also the founding chairman of the Dean's Council.

In 1997, she and her husband established the Paul and Daisy Soros Fellowship for New Americans in order to provide assistance to young new Americans for graduate studies. Initially established with a fifty million dollar trust fund, the Soroses donated an additional $25 million in 2010 and have supported over 825 grantees to date.

Soros serves on the boards of The Society of the Memorial Sloan-Kettering Cancer Center, The Foreign Policy Association and The American Austrian Foundation. She is on the Mount Sinai Lung Cancer advisory committee. She is an honorary trustee of the International House in New York.

== Involvement in the arts ==
Daisy Soros serves on the chairman's council of the Metropolitan Museum of Art. She is an executive committee member and secretary at the New York Philharmonic and the Advisory Director Metropolitan Opera, director emeritus of the Lincoln Center for the Performing Arts, Vice President of Venetian Heritage, and a former Chairman of the Board of the Friends of the Budapest Festival Orchestra.

== Family life ==
Paul Soros and Daisy Schlenger met in 1950 in New York, where they were both college students living at the International House. They began dating, and married in 1951. They had four children, Peter, Steven Paul, Linda and Jeffrey. Steven Paul and Linda died in separate accidents in early childhood. Their two surviving children, Peter and Jeffrey, both serve on the Board of the Paul and Daisy Soros Fellowship Program, Jeffrey as its President.

== Awards and honors ==
Soros has received several awards and honors for her philanthropic work, including:

- The Metro International Fulbright Award
- The Lincoln Center Laureate Award
- The Ellis Island Medal of Honor
- The International House Harry Edmonds Award
- The Casita Maria Gold Medal of Honor
- The National Immigration Forum's "Keepers of the American Dream Award"
- Honors from the Henry Street Settlement
- Honorary Doctorate of Laws at Bates College in Maine
- Honorary Doctorate of Humane Letters from Macaulay Honors College of the City University of New York
- Honorary Doctorate of Arts from the New York School of Interior Design
