= Antônia Melo =

Brazilian environmental activist

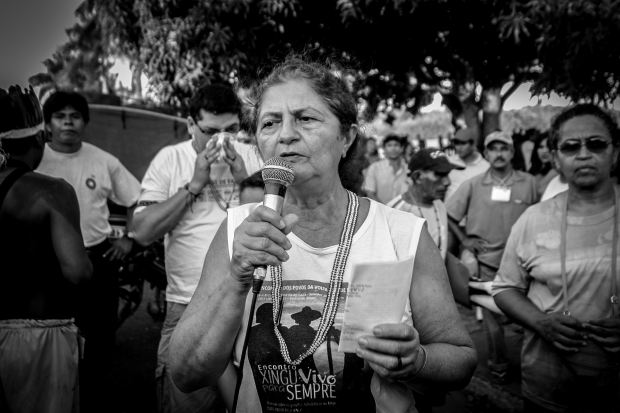
Antônia Melo (2017)

Antônia Melo da Silva (born 1949) is a Brazilian human rights activist and environmentalist. In 2017, she received the Alexander Soros Foundation Award for Environmental and Human Rights Activism for leading campaigns against the construction of the Belo Monte Dam and other environmentally harmful projects in the Amazon rainforest.

== Biography ==
Born in Piripiri, Piauí, in 1949, Antônia Melo da Silva was brought up by peasant parents who taught her the importance of fighting for their land and their rights. In 1953, she and her family moved to Altamira, Pará, and settled in Conceição do Araguaia on the banks of the Xingu River where her parents developed a successful farm. In 1959, she attended a religious school and then trained to be a teacher.

In 1970, she married and moved to a house in Altamira where she raised a family of four children while working as a teacher. From the late 1980s, she became active in a number of organizations founded to protect the rights of the indigenous people living in the area, in particular by campaigning against the construction of the Belo Monte Dam. In May 2008, she was a co-founder of the Movimento Xingu Vivo Para Sempre which fought against the construction of the dam and the related hydroelectric project. Over the years, the movement combined social and environmental organizations with communities along the river including fishermen, agricultural workers, town dwellers, native peoples and religious and women's organizations.

Despite her campaigning, the Belo Monte Dam was built and Melo had to move out of her home. But she has since become involved in many similar movements and has been able until now to counter plans for the construction of a huge dam on the Tapajós River. In honouring Antônia Melo with the Foundation Award, Alexander Soros commented: "She is one of the heroes of the environmental and human rights movement, and I can't think of anyone who deserves the Alexander Soros Foundation Award more than she does."
