= Susan Weber (historian) =

American historian (born 1954)

- Born: 1954 (age 71–72); New York City, U.S.
- Education: Barnard College (BA); Parsons School of Design (MA); Royal College of Art (PhD)
- Spouse: George Soros (m. 1983; div. 2005)
- Children: 2, including Alexander Soros

Susan Weber (born 1954) is an American historian. She is the founder and director of the Bard Graduate Center (BGC) for studies in the decorative arts, design history, and material culture affiliated with Bard College in Dutchess County, New York. She was previously married to George Soros.

== Early life and education ==
Susan Weber was born in Brooklyn, New York City, the daughter of Iris and Murray Weber. Her father was a manufacturer of shoe accessories; her mother was a housewife. Her father was born in New York City to parents who had emigrated from Russia. Her mother passed on her fondness for the decorative arts. She grew up in the New York City area in a non-observant Jewish household; summing up her upbringing, Weber stated: "We were cultural Jews."

She attended an Episcopal high school in Brooklyn and graduated from Barnard College with a degree in art history. In 1990, she earned a master's degree from Cooper-Hewitt/Parsons.

She also studied at the Royal College of Art in London, where she earned her PhD degree (1998) with a thesis on the furniture of E. W. Godwin.

== Career ==
Weber was executive director of the Open Society Institute (OSI), the umbrella name for some 24 independent foundations that support the advancement of freedom of expression around the globe.

In 1991, Weber was turned down for the job of director of graduate education at the Parsons School of Design. So, with $20 million of her husband's money, she started her own school in 1993, establishing the Bard Graduate Center where she is professor of the history of the decorative arts. BGC offers graduate degrees in history of the decorative and applied arts, cultural and design history, garden history, and landscape studies.

== Personal life ==
In 1983, Weber married billionaire George Soros, twenty-four years her senior, and the primary contributor to the Open Society Institute (OSI). They had two children, Alexander (born 1985) and Gregory (born 1988). They divorced in 2005.

== Bibliography ==
- Soros, Susan Weber (ed.) (2006). James 'Athenian' Stuart: The Rediscovery of Antiquity (Bard Graduate Center for Studies in the Decorative Arts, Design & Culture). New Haven, CT and London: Yale University Press ISBN 978-0-300-11713-4
- Soros, Susan Weber, and Stefanie Walker (ed.) (2004). Castellani and Italian Archaeological Jewelry (Bard Graduate Center for Studies in the Decorative Arts, Design & Culture) . New Haven, CT and London: Yale University Press ISBN 978-0300-10461-5
- Soros, Susan Weber, and Catherine Arbuthnott (2003). Thomas Jeckyll: Architect and Designer, 1827–1881. New Haven, CT and London: Yale University Press ISBN 978-0-300-09922-5 (Winner of the 2004 Henry Russell Hitchcock Award sponsored by the Victorian Society in America and winner of the 2005 Philip Johnson Award given by the Society of Architectural Historians)
- Soros, Susan Weber (ed.) (1999). E.W. Godwin: Aesthetic Movement Architect and Designer. New Haven, CT and London: Yale University Press ISBN 978-0-300-08008-7
- Soros, Susan Weber (ed.) (1999). The Secular Furniture of E.W. Godwin: With Catalogue Raisonné New Haven, CT and London: Yale University Press ISBN 978-0-300-08159-6
