= Paul Soros =

Hungarian-American businessman (1926–2013)

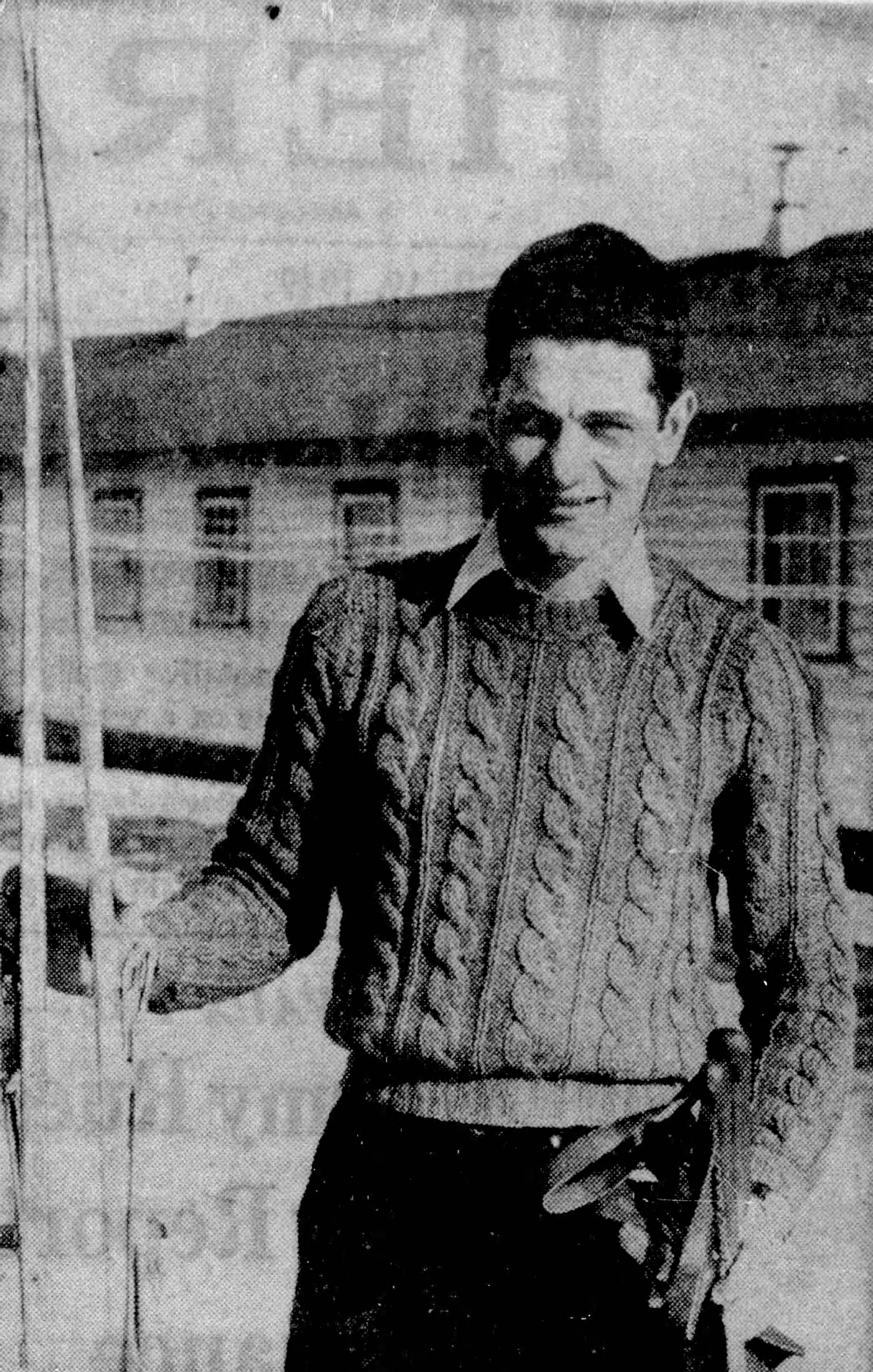
- Soros c. 1949
- Born: Pál Schwartz; June 5, 1926; Budapest, Kingdom of Hungary
- Died: June 15, 2013 (aged 87); New York City, U.S.
- Education: Brooklyn Collegiate and Polytechnic Institute (MS)
- Spouse: Daisy Schlenger (m. 1951)
- Children: 4
- Father: Tivadar Soros
- Relatives: George Soros (brother); Robert Soros (nephew); Jonathan Soros (nephew); Alexander Soros (nephew)

Paul Soros (Hungarian: Soros Pál; born Pál Schwartz; June 5, 1926 – June 15, 2013) was a Hungarian-born American mechanical engineer, inventor, businessman and philanthropist. Soros founded Soros Associates, which designs and develops bulk handling and port facilities. Soros Associates currently operates in ninety-one countries worldwide, as of 2013. Paul Soros, often called "the invisible Soros", was the older brother of George Soros, a businessman and financier.

== Early life ==
Soros was born Pál Schwartz on June 5, 1926, in Budapest, Hungary, to Tivadar Schwartz, a lawyer and author, and Erzsébet Szűcs, the daughter of the owner of a fabric store. His father had been captured by the Russians during World War I and held in a detention camp in Siberia. Soros was also a native speaker of Esperanto, a constructed language.

Tivadar Soros changed the family's surname from Schwartz to Soros in 1936 to escape antisemitism and the expansion of Nazism in Europe. Tivadar Soros forged paperwork, giving the family alias as the Germans occupied Hungary in 1944. The family fled to safe houses for nearly a year, until Soviet forces invaded the country. However, the Soviets mistakenly believed that Paul Soros was a wanted SS officer and arrested him. He was marched east, towards the Soviet Union with other prisoners. He managed to escape the prisoner march by ducking behind a bridge and hiding in an abandoned farm house. He then walked back to Budapest.

Paul Soros survived the war and emigrated to the United States in 1948. He arrived in Manhattan after defecting from Hungary, then under Communist control, while traveling in Switzerland with the Hungarian Olympic ski team.

== Career ==
Soros arrived in New York City with very little money. He enrolled at Brooklyn Collegiate and Polytechnic Institute (present-day New York University Tandon School of Engineering), where he earned his master's degree, as he could not afford the higher priced Ivy League universities. He resided in a cheap apartment near Prospect Park as a student, but still struggled to pay for rent and food.

Soros founded Soros Associates, which designs and develops bulk handling and port facilities. The Brazilian multinational, Tubarão, used designs created by Soros's company to quadruple Brazil's iron ore output and become the world's largest corporate iron ore producer. Soros Associates now operates in 91 countries around the world.

== Philanthropy ==
Paul Soros and his wife, Daisy Soros, founded The Paul & Daisy Soros Fellowships for New Americans, which provides funding for graduate degrees for immigrants and the children of immigrants. Each year, thirty students are awarded a fellowship of up to $90,000 to cover two years of graduate tuition, as well as living and other expenses. The fellows may study any subject they wish at any American university. In order to be awarded the fellowship, students must demonstrate a unique "idea or talent," have accomplished something concrete through long term effort, and have been involved with the government or other organization dedicated to the ideals of the U.S. Bill of Rights.

Paul and Daisy Soros founded the Paul and Daisy Soros Fellowship in 1998 with $50 million. By 2010, they had awarded more than $30 million to nearly 400 students. They dedicated an additional $25 million to the Fellowship in 2010. Paul Soros served as Chairman of the Fellowship, and his son, Jeffrey Soros, became president in 2010.

== Personal life ==
Paul Soros and Daisy Schlenger met in 1950 in New York, where they were both college students living at the International House. They began dating, and married in 1951. They had four children, Peter, Steven Paul, Linda and Jeffrey. Both Peter and Jeffrey serve on the Board of the Paul and Daisy Soros Fellowship Program, Jeffrey as its President. Steven Paul and Linda died in separate accidents in early childhood.

== Death ==
Soros died at his Fifth Avenue home on the Upper East Side of Manhattan on June 15, 2013, at the age of 87. He had suffered from Parkinson's disease, diabetes, jaw cancer and tongue cancer during his later life. Soros was survived by his wife, Daisy Soros (née Schlenger), who, like her husband, was a Hungarian Jewish immigrant.
