= Robert Slater =

American journalist

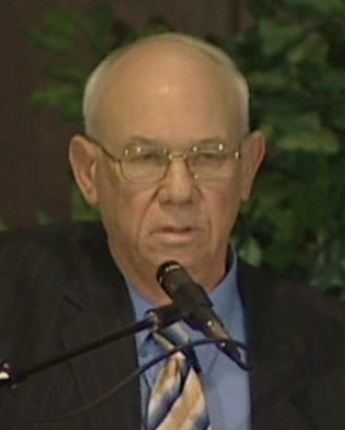
- Slater in 2005
- Born: October 1, 1943; Manhattan, New York
- Died: March 25, 2014 (aged 70); Jerusalem
- Children: Adam Slater, Rachel Slater, Miryam Slater

Robert Slater (Hebrew: רוברט סלייטר; October 1, 1943 – March 25, 2014) was an American author and journalist known for over two dozen books, including biographies of political and business figures such as Golda Meir, Yitzhak Rabin, George Soros, and Donald Trump.

Slater was born in Manhattan and grew up in South Orange, New Jersey. He graduated from Columbia High School in 1962 and graduated with honors from the University of Pennsylvania in 1966, with a degree in political science. In 1967 he received a master's degree in international relations from the London School of Economics. He worked for United Press International (UPI) from 1969 to 1971 before moving to Jerusalem, where he worked for UPI until 1974; and for Time magazine in Jerusalem from 1976 to 1996. From 1987 and 1990 he was chairman of the Foreign Press Association in Israel. In his later years he was a columnist for The Jerusalem Report, and mentored young journalists at The Jerusalem Post. He lived for much of his life in Israel, and with his wife, Elinor, co-authored the books Great Jewish Women and Great Jewish Men. He died in Jerusalem on March 25, 2014, aged 70, from complications of the flu.

== Books ==
- Rabin of Israel (1977, revised 1996)
- Golda: The Uncrowned Queen of Israel (1981)
- Great Jews in Sports (1983, revised 2000)
- The Titans of the Takeover (1987, revised 1999)
- Portraits in Silicon (1987)
- This… Is CBS: A Chronicle of Sixty Years (1988)
- Warrior Statesman: The Life of Moshe Dayan (1991)
- The New GE: How Jack Welch Revived an American Institution (1993)
- The Jewish Child's Book of Sports Heroes (1993)
- Get Better or Get Beaten: Thirty-one Leadership Secrets from GE's Jack Welch (1994, revised, 2001)
- (With Elinor Slater) Great Jewish Women (1994)
- (With Elinor Slater) Great Jewish Men (1996)
- Soros: The Life, Times, and Trading Secrets of the World's Greatest Investor (1996)
- Invest First, Investigate Later: And Twenty-three Other Trading Secrets of George Soros, the Legendary Investor (1996)
- Ovitz: The Inside Story of Hollywood's Most Controversial Power Broker (1997)
- John Bogle and the Vanguard Experiment: One Man's Quest to Transform the Mutual Fund Industry (1997)
- Great Moments in Jewish History (1998)
- Jack Welch and the GE Way: Management Insights and Leadership Secrets of the Legendary CEO (1999)
- Saving Big Blue: Leadership Lessons and Turnaround Tactics of IBM's Lou Gerstner (1999)
- The GE Way Fieldbook: Jack Welch's Battle Plan for Corporate Revolution (2000)
- Blue Chip of the New Economy: John Chambers and the Cisco Systems Way (2001)
- The Eye of the Storm: How John Chambers Steered Cisco Through the Internet Collapse (2003)
- Magic Cancer Bullet: How a Tiny Orange Pill Is Rewriting Medical History (2003)
- The Wal-Mart Decade: How a Generation of Leaders Turned Sam Walton's Legacy into the World's Number One Company (2003)
- Microsoft Rebooted: How Bill Gates and Steve Ballmer Reinvented Their Company (2004)
- Martha: On Trial, in Jail, and on a Comeback (2005)
- No Such Thing as Over-Exposure: Inside the Life and Celebrity of Donald Trump (2005)
- (With Susan Cutaia and Anthony Cutaia) Untapped Riches: Never Pay Off Your Mortgage- and Other Surprising Secrets for Building Wealth (2007)
- Seizing Power: The Grab for Global Oil Wealth (2010)
- Rabin: 20 Years After (2015)
