= George Soros =

Hungarian and American investor and philanthropist (born 1930)

George Soros HonFBA
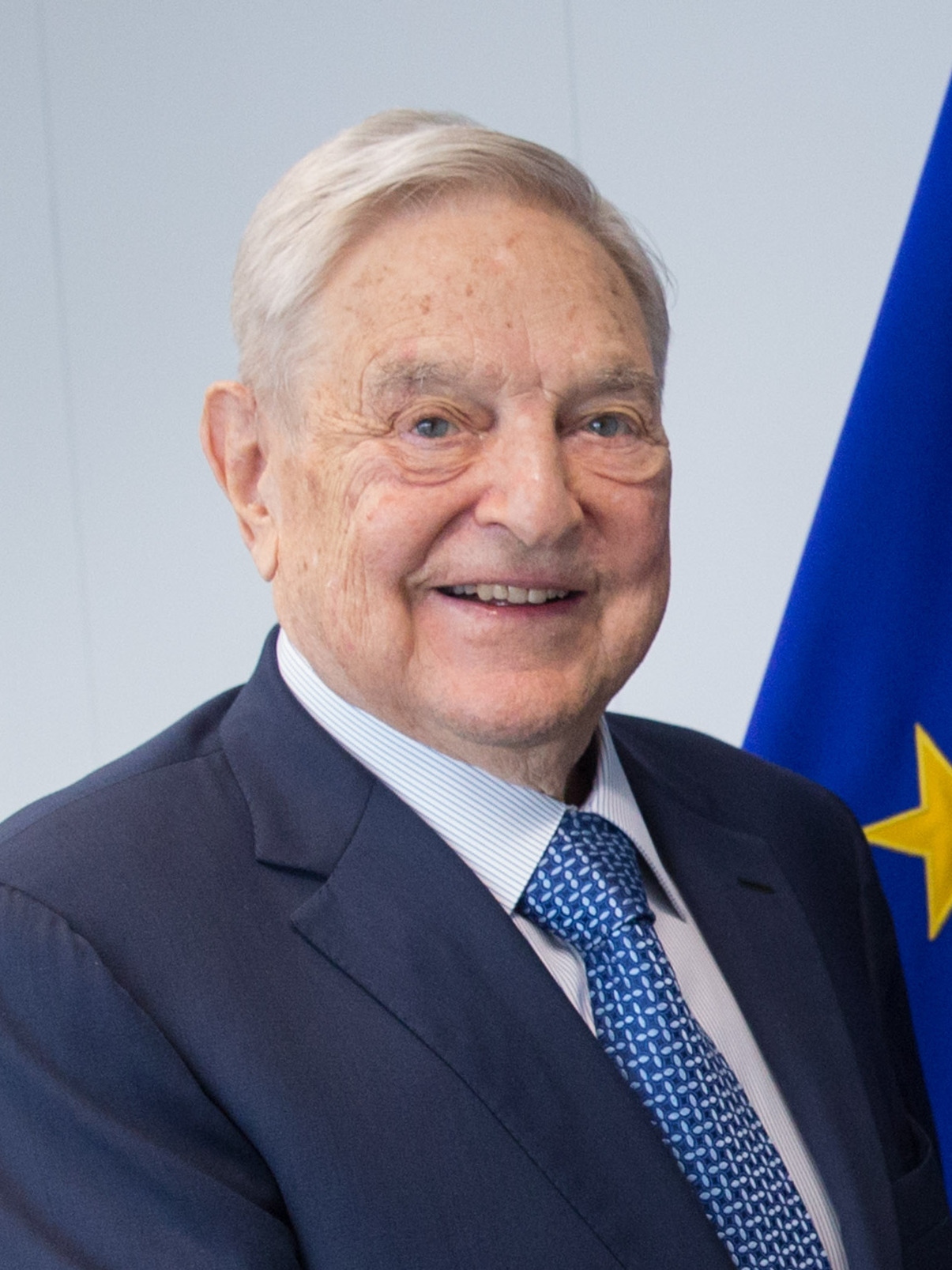
- Soros in 2017
- Born: Schwartz György; August 12, 1930 (age 96); Budapest, Kingdom of Hungary
- Citizenship: Hungary; United States (since 1961)
- Education: London School of Economics (BSc, MSc)
- Occupations: Investor; hedge fund manager; author; philanthropist
- Known for: Philanthropy; Founding and managing Soros Fund Management; Founding the Open Society Foundations; Advising the Quantum Fund; Founding Central European University
- Spouses: Annaliese Witschak (m. 1960; div. 1983) Susan Weber (m. 1983; div. 2005) Tamiko Bolton (m. 2013)
- Children: 5, including Robert, Jonathan and Alexander
- Father: Tivadar Soros
- Relatives: Paul Soros (brother)
- Awards: Presidential Medal of Freedom (2025)
- Website: www.georgesoros.com

George Soros (Note: /ˈsɒroʊs/ SORR-ohss or /ˈsɒrɒs/ SORR-oss; Hungarian: Soros György (name written in Eastern order), pronounced [ˈʃoroʃ ˈɟørɟ], SHORR-osh.) (born Schwartz György; August 12, 1930) is a Hungarian and American (Note: Soros was born in the Kingdom of Hungary but naturalized as an American citizen on December 18, 1961. He retains his Hungarian nationality and is effectively a dual-national.) investor and philanthropist. As of September 2026, he had a net worth of US$8.6 billion. Soros has donated more than $32 billion to the Open Society Foundations. In 2020, Forbes called Soros the "most generous giver" in terms of percentage of net worth.

Born in Budapest to a Jewish family, Soros survived the Nazi occupation of Hungary as a teenager and moved to the United Kingdom in 1947. He studied at the London School of Economics and was awarded a BSc in philosophy in 1951, and then a Master of Science degree, also in philosophy, in 1954. Soros started his career working in British and American merchant banks, before setting up his first hedge fund, Double Eagle, in 1969. Profits from this fund provided the seed money for Soros Fund Management, his second hedge fund, in 1970. Double Eagle was renamed Quantum Fund and was the principal firm Soros advised. At its founding, Quantum Fund had $12 million in assets under management, and as of 2011 it had $25 billion, the majority of Soros's overall net worth.

Soros is known as "The Man Who Broke the Bank of England" as a result of his short sale of US$10 billion worth of pounds sterling, which made him a profit of $1 billion, during the 1992 Black Wednesday UK currency crisis. Based on his early studies of philosophy, Soros formulated the general theory of reflexivity for capital markets, to provide insights into asset bubbles and fundamental/market value of securities, as well as value discrepancies used for shorting and swapping stocks.

Soros supports progressive and liberal political causes, to which he dispenses donations through the Open Society Foundations. Between 1979 and 2011, he donated more than $11 billion to various philanthropic causes; by 2017, his donations "on civil initiatives to reduce poverty and increase transparency, and on scholarships and universities around the world" totaled $12 billion. His influence and activities helped set off the fall of communism in Eastern Europe in the late 1980s and early 1990s, and provided one of Europe's largest higher education endowments to the Central European University in his Hungarian hometown. Soros's extensive funding of political causes has made him a "bugaboo of European nationalists". Numerous far-right theorists have promoted claims that characterize Soros as a dangerous "puppet master" behind alleged global plots. These portrayals of Soros, a Holocaust survivor, have been denounced as antisemitic conspiracy theories. In 2018, The New York Times reported that "conspiracy theories about him have gone mainstream, to nearly every corner of the Republican Party".

== Early life and education ==
György Schwartz was born on 12 August 1930 in Budapest in the Kingdom of Hungary to a prosperous non-observant Jewish family. Soros has wryly described his home as antisemitic. The family of his mother Erzsébet (also known as Elizabeth) operated a successful silk store. His father Tivadar (also known as Teodoro Ŝvarc) was a lawyer and a well-known Esperanto author who edited the Esperanto literary magazine Literatura Mondo and raised his son to speak the language. Tivadar had also been a prisoner of war during and after World War I until he escaped from Russia and rejoined his family in Budapest.

Soros's parents married in 1924. In 1936, Soros's family changed their name from the German-Jewish "Schwartz" to "Soros", as protective camouflage in increasingly antisemitic Hungary. Tivadar liked the new name because it is a palindrome and because of its meaning. In Hungarian, soros means "next"; in Esperanto it means "will soar".

Soros was 13 years old in March 1944 when Nazi Germany occupied Hungary. The Nazis barred Jewish children from attending school, and Soros and the other schoolchildren were made to report to the Judenrat ("Jewish Council"), which had been established during the occupation. Soros later described this time to writer Michael Lewis:

The Jewish Council asked the little kids to hand out the deportation notices. I was told to go to the Jewish Council. And there I was given these small slips of paper ... I took this piece of paper to my father. He instantly recognized it. This was a list of Hungarian Jewish lawyers. He said, "You deliver the slips of paper and tell the people that if they report they will be deported". I'm not sure to what extent he knew they were going to be gassed. I did what my father said.

Soros did not return to that job; his family survived the war by purchasing documents to say that they were Christians. Later that year at age 14, Soros posed as the Christian godson of an official of the collaborationist Hungarian government's Ministry of Agriculture, who himself had a Jewish wife in hiding. On one occasion, rather than leave the 14-year-old alone, the official took Soros with him while completing an inventory of a Jewish family's confiscated estate. Tivadar saved not only his immediate family, but also many other Hungarian Jews, and Soros later wrote that 1944 had been "the happiest [year] of his life", for it had given him the opportunity to witness his father's heroism. In 1945, Soros survived the Siege of Budapest, in which Soviet and German forces fought house-to-house through the city. George and his mother also spent some time hiding with the family of Elza Brandeisz and even attended their Lutheran church with them. When he was 17, Soros relocated to Paris before eventually moving to England. There he became a student at the London School of Economics. While a student of the philosopher Karl Popper, Soros worked as a railway porter and as a waiter, and once received £40 from a Quaker charity. Soros would sometimes stand at Speakers' Corner lecturing about the virtues of internationalism in Esperanto, which he had learned from his father. Soros obtained his Bachelor of Science in philosophy in 1951 and a Master of Science in philosophy in 1954 from the London School of Economics. After graduating, he wanted to stay in the university and work as a professor, but his grades were not high enough, prompting him to work for an investment firm in London.

== Financial career ==
=== Early business experience ===
In a discussion at the Los Angeles World Affairs Council in 2006, Alvin Shuster, former foreign editor of the Los Angeles Times, asked Soros, "How does one go from an immigrant to a financier? ... When did you realize that you knew how to make money?". Soros replied, "Well, I had a variety of jobs and I ended up selling fancy goods on the seaside, souvenir shops, and I thought, that's really not what I was cut out to do. So, I wrote to every managing director in every merchant bank in London, got just one or two replies, and eventually that's how I got a job in a merchant bank."

=== Singer and Friedlander ===
In 1954, Soros began his financial career at the merchant bank Singer & Friedlander of London. He worked as a clerk and later moved to the arbitrage department. A fellow employee, Robert Mayer, suggested he apply at his father's brokerage house, F.M. Mayer of New York.

=== F. M. Mayer ===
In 1956, Soros moved to New York City, where he worked as an arbitrage trader for F. M. Mayer (1956–59). He specialized in European stocks, which were becoming popular with U.S. institutional investors following the formation of the Coal and Steel Community, which later became the Common Market.

=== Wertheim and Co. ===
In 1959, after three years at F. M. Mayer, Soros moved to Wertheim & Co. He planned to stay for five years, enough time to save $500,000, after which he intended to return to England to study philosophy. He worked as an analyst of European securities until 1963.

During this period, Soros developed the theory of reflexivity to extend the ideas of his tutor at the London School of Economics, Karl Popper. Reflexivity posits that market values are often driven by the fallible ideas of participants, not only by the economic fundamentals of the situation. Ideas and events influence each other in reflexive feedback loops. Soros argued that this process leads to markets having procyclical "virtuous" or "vicious" cycles of boom and bust, in contrast to the equilibrium predictions of more standard neoclassical economics.

=== Arnhold and S. Bleichroeder ===
From 1963 to 1973, Soros's experience as a vice president at Arnhold and S. Bleichroeder resulted in little enthusiasm for the job; business was slack following the introduction of the Interest Equalization Tax, which undermined the viability of Soros's European trading. He spent the years from 1963 to 1966 with his main focus on the revision of his philosophy dissertation. In 1966, he started a fund with $100,000 of the firm's money to experiment with his trading strategies.

In 1969, Soros set up the Double Eagle hedge fund with $4M of investors' capital including $250,000 of his own money. It was based in Curaçao, Dutch Antilles. Double Eagle itself was an offshoot of Arnhold and S. Bleichroeder's First Eagle fund established by Soros and that firm's chairman Henry H. Arnhold in 1967.

In 1973, the Double Eagle Fund had $12 million and formed the basis of the Soros Fund. George Soros and Jim Rogers received returns on their share of capital and 20 percent of the profits each year.

=== Soros Fund Management ===
In 1970, Soros founded Soros Fund Management and became its chairman. Among those who held senior positions there at various times were Jim Rogers, Stanley Druckenmiller, Mark Schwartz, Keith Anderson, and Soros's two sons.

In 1973, due to perceived conflicts of interest limiting his ability to run the two funds, Soros resigned from the management of the Double Eagle Fund. He then established the Soros Fund and gave investors in the Double Eagle Fund the option of transferring to that or staying with Arnhold and S. Bleichroeder.

By the time it was renamed the Quantum Fund, the value of the fund had grown to $12m, only a small proportion of which was Soros's own money. He and Jim Rogers reinvested their returns from the fund, and also a large part of their 20% performance fees, thereby expanding their stake.

By 1981, the fund had grown to $400m, and then a 22% loss in that year and substantial redemptions by some of the investors reduced it to $200m.

In 2002, George Soros was found guilty of insider trading in France and fined $2.3m, the profit he had made on the alleged scheme. In 2006, he lost an appeal in France's highest court, then took the case to the European Court of Human Rights, where, in 2011, he lost again. In consequence, Soros planned to appeal to the Grand Chamber of the European Court of Human Rights.

In July 2011, Soros announced that he had returned funds from outside investors' money (valued at $1 billion) and instead invested funds from his $24.5 billion family fortune, due to changes in U.S. Securities and Exchange Commission disclosure rules, which he felt would compromise his duties of confidentiality to his investors. The fund had at that time averaged over 20% per year compound returns.

In 2013, the Quantum Fund made $5.5 billion, making it again the most successful hedge fund in history. Since its inception in 1973, the fund has generated $40 billion.

The fund announced in 2015 that it would inject $300 million to help finance the expansion of Fen Hotels, an Argentine hotel company. The funds will develop 5,000 rooms over the next three years throughout various Latin American countries.

=== Economic crisis in the 1990s and 2000s ===
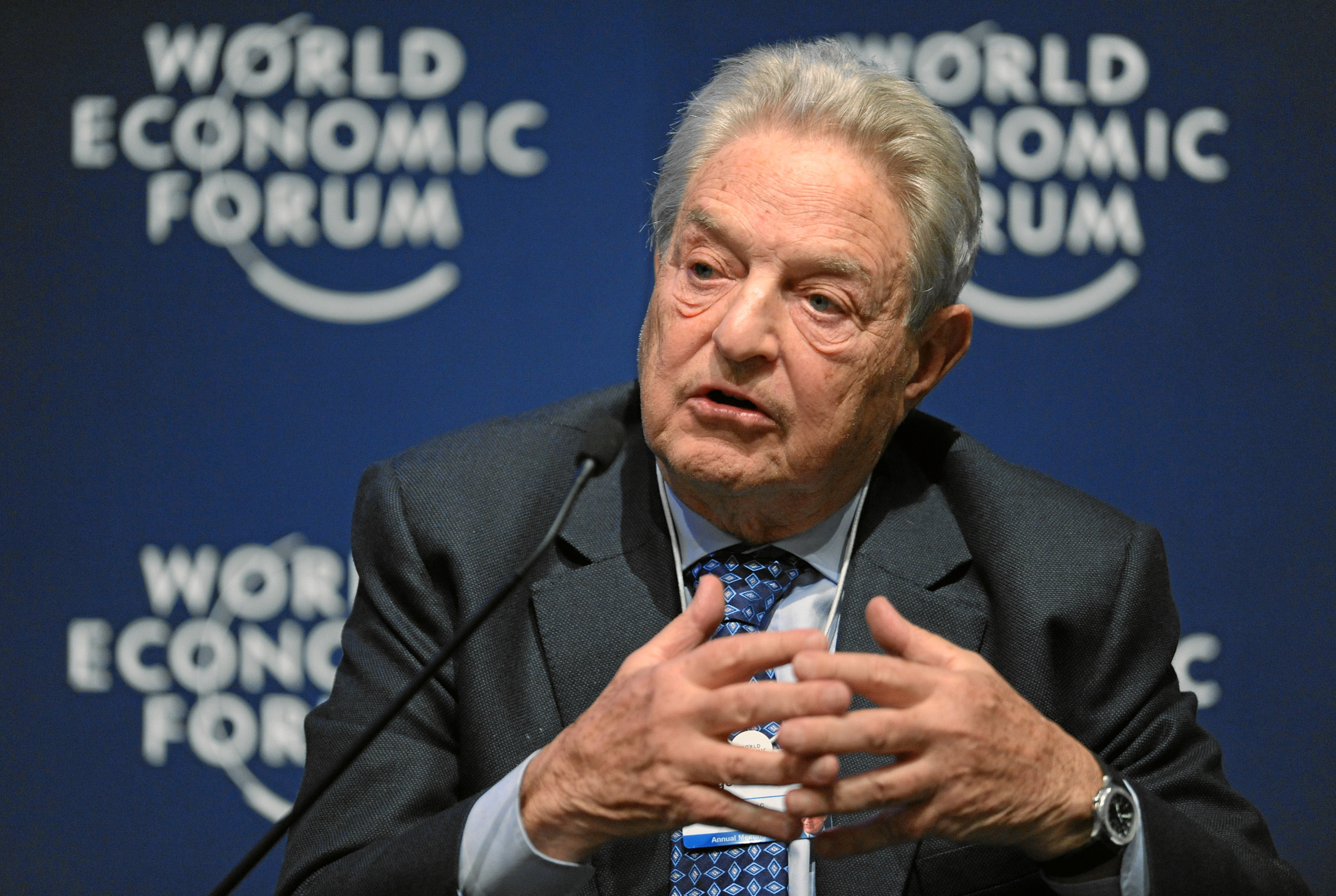
Soros during a session on redesigning the international monetary system at the World Economic Forum Annual Meeting 2011

Soros had been building a huge short position in pounds sterling for months leading up to the Black Wednesday of September 1992. Soros had recognized the unfavorable position of the United Kingdom in the European Exchange Rate Mechanism. For Soros, the rate at which the United Kingdom was brought into the European Exchange Rate Mechanism was too high, their inflation was also much too high (triple the German rate), and British interest rates were hurting their asset prices.

By September 16, 1992, the day of Black Wednesday, Soros's fund had sold short more than $10 billion in pounds, profiting from the UK government's reluctance to either raise its interest rates to levels comparable to those of other European Exchange Rate Mechanism countries or float its currency.

Finally, the UK withdrew from the European Exchange Rate Mechanism, devaluing the pound. Soros's profit on the bet was estimated at over $1 billion. He was dubbed "the man who broke the Bank of England". The estimated cost of Black Wednesday to the UK Treasury was £3.4 billion. Stanley Druckenmiller, who traded under Soros, originally saw the weakness in the pound and stated: "[Soros's] contribution was pushing him to take a gigantic position".

On October 26, 1992, The New York Times quoted Soros as saying: "Our total position by Black Wednesday had to be worth almost $10 billion. We planned to sell more than that. In fact, when Norman Lamont said just before the devaluation that he would borrow nearly $15 billion to defend sterling, we were amused because that was about how much we wanted to sell."

Soros was believed to have traded billions of Finnish markkas on February 5, 1996, in anticipation of selling them short. The markka had been put floating as a result of the early 1990s depression. The Bank of Finland and the Finnish Government commented at the time they believed that a "conspiracy" was impossible.

During the 1997 Asian financial crisis, the prime minister of Malaysia, Mahathir Mohamad, accused Soros of using the wealth under his control to punish the Association of Southeast Asian Nations (ASEAN) for welcoming Myanmar as a member. With a history of antisemitic remarks, Mahathir made specific reference to Soros's Jewish background ("It is a Jew who triggered the currency plunge") and implied Soros was orchestrating the crash as part of a larger Jewish conspiracy. Nine years later, in 2006, Mahathir met with Soros and afterward stated that he accepted that Soros had not been responsible for the crisis. In 1998's The Crisis of Global Capitalism: Open Society Endangered, Soros explained his role in the crisis as follows:

The financial crisis that originated in Thailand in 1997 was particularly unnerving because of its scope and severity ... By the beginning of 1997, it was clear to Soros Fund Management that the discrepancy between the trade account and the capital account was becoming untenable. We sold short the Thai baht and the Malaysian ringgit early in 1997 with maturities ranging from six months to a year. (That is, we entered into contracts to deliver at future dates Thai baht and Malaysian ringgit that we did not currently hold.) Subsequently, Prime Minister Mahathir of Malaysia accused me of causing the crisis, a wholly unfounded accusation. We were not sellers of the currency during or several months before the crisis; on the contrary, we were buyers when the currencies began to decline—we were purchasing ringgits to realize the profits on our earlier speculation. (Much too soon, as it turned out. We left most of the potential gain on the table because we were afraid that Mahathir would impose capital controls. He did so, but much later.)

Also during this time, Soros, through his Soros Quantum Fund, attempted to sell short the Hong Kong dollar, using the similar strategies that he used during his bettings against the pound, baht, and peso. However, due in part to China's backing by maintaining a fixed exchange rate with the Hong Kong dollar, Hong Kong's currency remained more or less stable. Therefore, he lost most of the money shorted against the HKD.

In 1999, economist Paul Krugman was critical of Soros's effect on financial markets:

[N]obody who has read a business magazine in the last few years can be unaware that these days there really are investors who not only move money in anticipation of a currency crisis, but actually do their best to trigger that crisis for fun and profit. These new actors on the scene do not yet have a standard name; my proposed term is "Soroi".

In an interview concerning the late-2000s recession, Soros referred to it as the most serious crisis since the 1930s. According to Soros, market fundamentalism with its assumption that markets will correct themselves with no need for government intervention in financial affairs has been "some kind of an ideological excess". In Soros's view, the markets' moods—a "mood" of the markets being a prevailing bias or optimism/pessimism with which the markets look at reality—"actually can reinforce themselves so that there are these initially self-reinforcing but eventually unsustainable and self-defeating boom/bust sequences or bubbles".

In reaction to the Great Recession, he founded the Institute for New Economic Thinking in October 2009. This is a think tank composed of international economic, business, and financial experts, who are mandated to investigate radical new approaches to organizing the international economic and financial system.

==== Société Générale insider trading conviction ====
In 1988, Soros was contacted by a French financier named Georges Pébereau, who asked him to participate in an effort to assemble a group of investors to purchase a large number of shares in Société Générale, a leading French bank that was part of a privatization program (something instituted by the new government under Jacques Chirac). Soros eventually decided against participating in the group effort, opting to personally move forward with his strategy of accumulating shares in four French companies: Société Générale, as well as Suez, Paribas, and the Compagnie Générale d'Électricité.

In 1989, the Commission des Opérations de Bourse (COB, the French stock exchange regulatory authority) conducted an investigation of whether Soros's transaction in Société Générale should be considered insider trading. Soros had received no information from the Société Générale and had no insider knowledge of the business, but he did possess knowledge that a group of investors was planning a takeover attempt. Initial investigations found Soros innocent, and no charges were brought forward. However, the case was reopened a few years later, and the French Supreme Court confirmed the conviction on June 14, 2006, although it reduced the penalty to €940,000.

Soros denied any wrongdoing, saying news of the takeover was public knowledge and it was documented that his intent to acquire shares of the company predated his own awareness of the takeover. In December 2006, he appealed to the European Court of Human Rights on various grounds, including that the 14-year delay in bringing the case to trial precluded a fair hearing. On the basis of Article 7 of the European Convention on Human Rights, stating that no person may be punished for an act that was not a criminal offense at the time that it was committed, the court agreed to hear the appeal. In October 2011, the court rejected his appeal in a 4–3 decision, saying that Soros had been aware of the risk of breaking insider trading laws.

== Political involvement ==
=== United States ===
Until the 2004 presidential election, Soros had not been a large donor to U.S. political campaigns. According to OpenSecrets, during the 2003–2004 election cycle, Soros donated $23,581,000 to various 527 Groups (tax-exempt groups under the United States tax code, 26 U.S.C. § 527). The groups aimed to defeat President George W. Bush. After Bush's reelection, Soros and other donors backed a new political fundraising group called Democracy Alliance, which supports progressive causes and the formation of a stronger progressive infrastructure in America.

In August 2009, Soros donated $35 million to the state of New York to be earmarked for underprivileged children and given to parents who had benefit cards at the rate of $200 per child aged 3 through 17, with no limit as to the number of children that qualified. An additional $140 million was put into the fund by the state of New York from money they had received from the 2009 federal recovery act. Soros was an initial donor to the Center for American Progress, and he continues to support the organization through the Open Society Foundations.

In October 2011, a Reuters story, "Soros: not a funder of Wall Street Protests", was published after several commentators pointed out errors in an earlier Reuters story headlined "Who's Behind the Wall St. Protests?" with a lead stating that the Occupy Wall Street movement "may have benefited indirectly from the largesse of one of the world's richest men [Soros]". Reuters's follow-up article also reported a Soros spokesman and Adbusters' co-founder Kalle Lasn both saying that Adbusters—the reputed catalyst for the first Occupy Wall Street protests—had never received any contributions from Soros, contrary to Reuters's earlier story that reported that "indirect financial links" existed between the two as late as 2010.

On September 27, 2012, Soros announced that he was donating $1 million to the super PAC backing President Barack Obama's reelection Priorities USA Action. In October 2013, Soros donated $25,000 to Ready for Hillary, becoming a co-chairman of the super PAC's national finance committee. In June 2015, he donated $1 million to the Super PAC Priorities USA Action, which supported Hillary Clinton in the 2016 presidential race. He donated $6 million to the PAC in December 2015 and $2.5 million in August 2016. Soros launched a new super PAC called Democracy PAC for the 2020 election cycle. By July 2019, he had donated $5.1 million to it.

Since 2016, Soros has been donating sums exceeding $1 million to the campaigns of progressive criminal justice reform proponents through the Safety and Justice PAC in local district attorney elections. In many districts, such large contributions were unprecedented and the campaigning strategy was "turned on its head" with a focus on incarceration, police misconduct and bail system, according to the Los Angeles Times. Larry Krasner was elected as the District Attorney of Philadelphia with the help of a $1.5 million ad campaign funded by Soros in 2017. Soros was the largest donor supporting the campaign of George Gascón for Los Angeles County District Attorney in 2020, contributing $2.25 million to superPACs in Gascón's favor. Soros gave $2 million to a PAC supporting Kim Foxx's campaign for Cook County State's Attorney in 2020.

In the second quarter of 2020, Soros gave at least $500,000 to presumptive Democratic presidential nominee Joe Biden, becoming one of the campaign's largest donors.

For the 2022 United States elections, Soros was the country's largest donor. He donated $128.5 million to support the Democratic Party in the election cycle. As of August 2026, Soros was the largest single donor in the 2026 United States elections, spending $102 million in support of Democratic campaigns.

=== Central and Eastern Europe ===
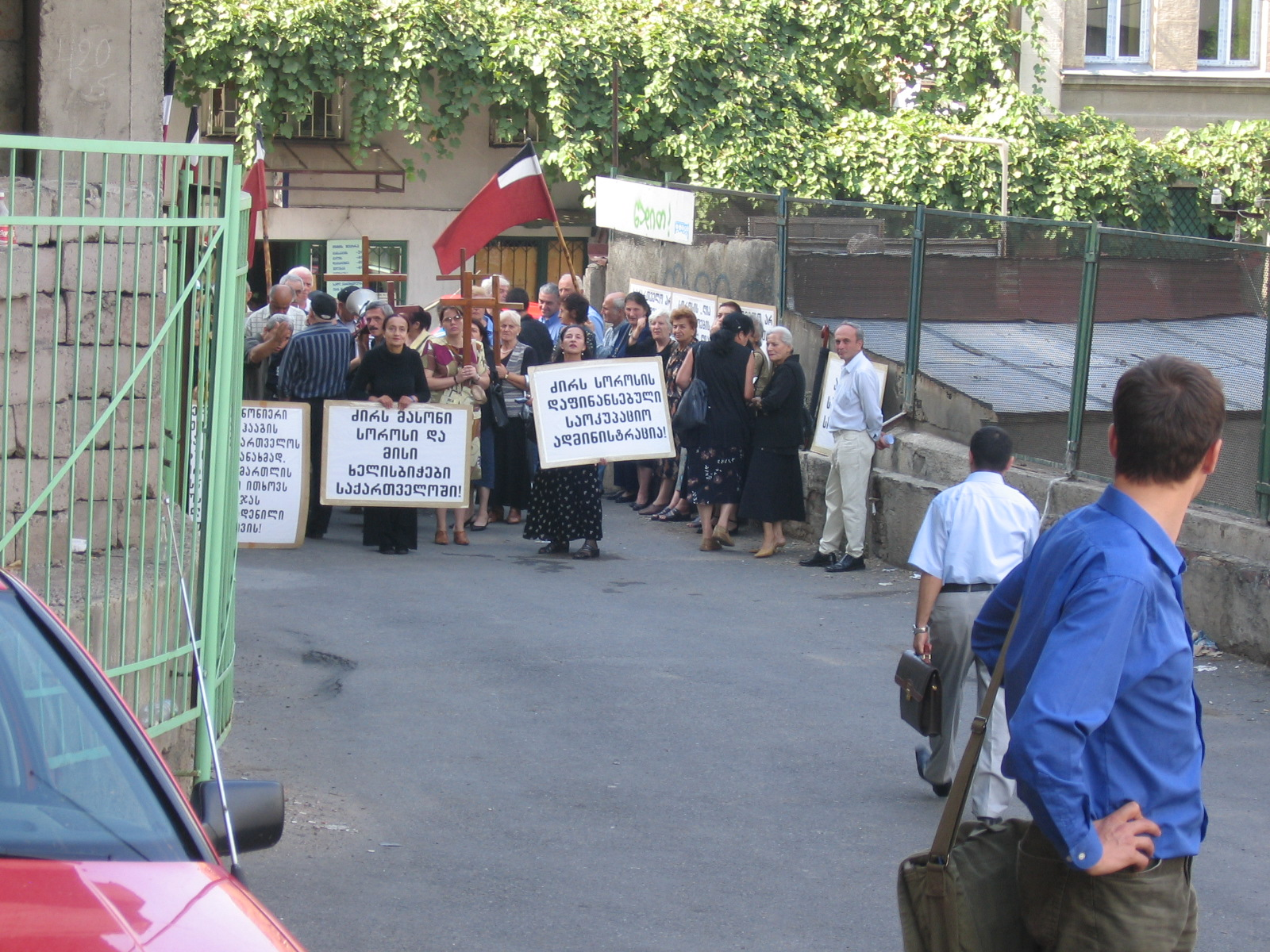
Protesters in Tbilisi with flag of the Democratic Republic of Georgia blocking the way from the Open Society Institute office, 2005

According to Waldemar A. Nielsen, an authority on American philanthropy, "[Soros] has undertaken... nothing less than to open up the once-closed communist societies of Eastern Europe to a free flow of ideas and scientific knowledge from the outside world". From 1979, as an advocate of 'open societies', Soros financially supported dissidents including Poland's Solidarity movement, Charter 77 in Czechoslovakia and Andrei Sakharov in the Soviet Union.

Since the fall of the Soviet Union, Soros's funding has played an important role in the newly independent countries. A 2017 study found that a grant program by George Soros which awarded funding to over 28,000 scientists in the former Soviet republics shortly after the end of the Soviet Union "more than doubled publications on the margin, significantly induced scientists to remain in the science sector, and had long-lasting [beneficial] impacts". His funding of pro-democratic programs in Georgia was considered by Georgian nationalists to be crucial to the success of the Rose Revolution, although Soros has said that his role has been "greatly exaggerated". Alexander Lomaia, secretary of the Georgian Security Council and former Minister of Education and Science, is a former executive director of the Open Society Georgia Foundation (Soros Foundation), overseeing a staff of 50 and a budget of $2.5 million.

Former Georgian foreign minister Salome Zourabichvili wrote that institutions like the Soros Foundation were the cradle of democratization and that all the NGOs that gravitated around the Soros Foundation undeniably carried the revolution. She opines that after the revolution the Soros Foundation and the NGOs were integrated into power.

Some Soros-backed pro-democracy initiatives have been banned in Kazakhstan and Turkmenistan. Ercis Kurtulus, head of the Social Transparency Movement Association (TSHD) in Turkey, said in an interview 2006 that "Soros carried out his will in Ukraine and Georgia by using these NGOs ... Last year Russia passed a special law prohibiting NGOs from taking money from foreigners. I think this should be banned in Turkey as well." In 1997, Soros closed his foundation in Belarus after it was fined $3 million by the government for "tax and currency violations". According to The New York Times 1997, the Belarusian president Alexander Lukashenko has been widely criticized in the West and in Russia for his efforts to control the Belarus Soros Foundation and other independent NGOs and to suppress civil and human rights. Soros called the fines part of a campaign to "destroy independent society".

In June 2009, Soros donated $100 million to Central Europe and Eastern Europe to counter the impact of the Great Recession on the poor, voluntary groups and non-government organizations.

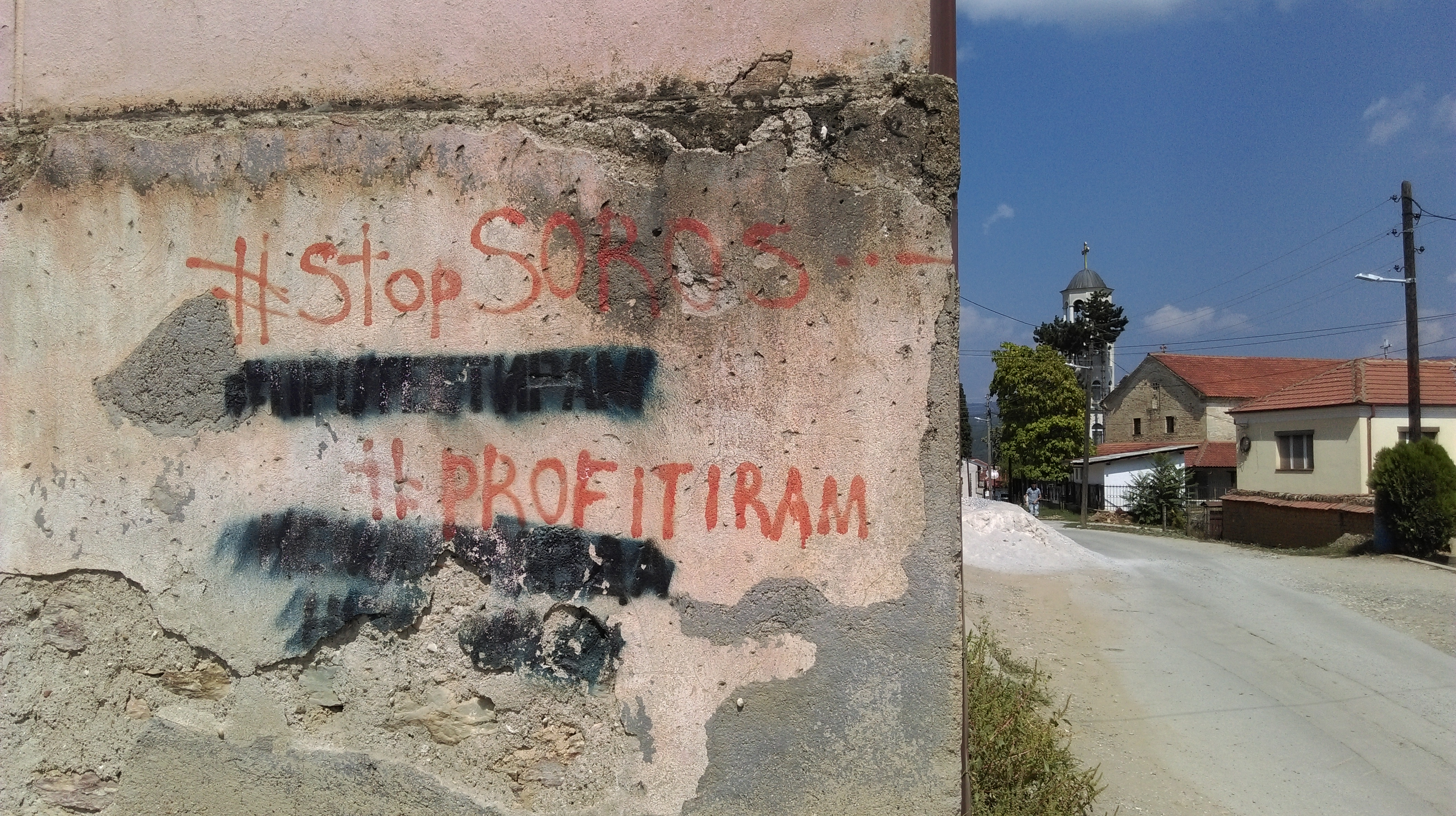
Anti-Soros sentiment graffiti in Resen, Macedonia, 2018. It reads: #Stop Soros #I will profit.

In March 2017, six US senators sent a letter to then secretary of state Rex Tillerson asking that he look into several grants the State Department and the US Agency for International Development (USAID) have given to groups funded by "left-wing" Soros. In the same context, the conservative group Judicial Watch has filed a Freedom of Information Act (FOIA) lawsuit against the U.S. Department of State and USAID compelling them to release records regarding $5 million transferred from USAID to Soros's Open Society branch in Macedonia. The suit alleges that the money was deliberately used to destabilize the Macedonian government. The Open Society Foundation has said its activities in Macedonia were aimed at ethnic reconciliation with the Albanian minority and other forms of assistance since the collapse of Yugoslavia.

In January 2017, the "Stop Operation Soros" (SOS) initiative was launched in Macedonia. SOS seeks to present "questions and answers about the way Soros operates worldwide" and invites citizens to contribute to the research. In a press conference held during the same month, Nenad Mircevski, one of the founders of the initiative, stated that SOS would work towards the "de-Soros-ization" of Macedonia.

==== Hungary ====
In 1984, he founded his first Open Society Institute in Hungary with a budget of $3 million.

Since 2012, the Hungarian Fidesz government has labelled George Soros as an enemy of the state. The government has disagreed with Soros's involvement in the 2015 European migrant crisis. The government has attacked OSF, the international civil support foundation created by George Soros, and tried to revoke the licence of Central European University (Budapest) (which failed mostly due to significant public outrage). In response, Soros called the government "a mafia state".

As the 2018 election period started, the government introduced public posters with a photo of Soros to create hostility in the general public towards him, using statements such as "Soros wants millions of migrants to live in Hungary", and "Soros wants to dismantle the border fence". The government also prepared a three-part law plan called the "Stop Soros package" (which followed other various law changes in the same year, hindering the workings of several international NGOs in Hungary), which would include various steps against NGOs doing volunteer work related to the refugee crisis.

On May 16, 2018, Soros's Open Society Foundations announced they would move its office from Budapest to Berlin, blaming the move on an "increasingly repressive" environment in Hungary.

=== Africa ===
The Open Society Initiative for Southern Africa is a Soros-affiliated organization.

=== Chile ===
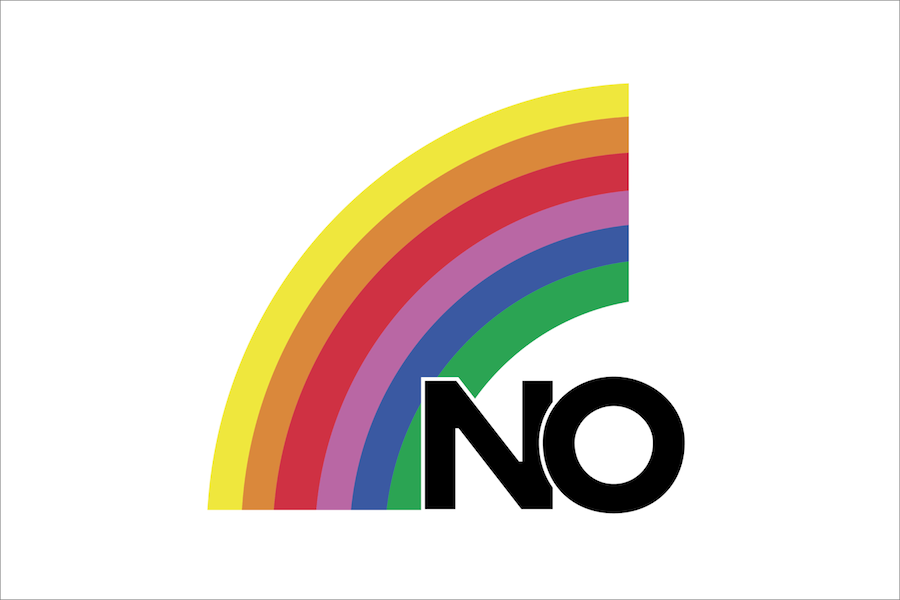
George Soros directly supported the "No" campaign in the 1988 plebiscite.

George Soros provided advice to the "No" campaign in the 1988 plebiscite that ended the Pinochet military dictatorship, according to the magnate's friend Máximo Pacheco Matte. His support was reflected "in carrying out studies and obtaining data that gave us information that had been kept from us for 17 years (...) What we learned there was crucial for the preparation of the famous television program of the 'No' campaign and for the victory in the plebiscite."

He also sought to improve the image of then-candidate Ricardo Lagos in the 2000 presidential election among business circles.

=== Diplomacy ===
Soros has helped fund the non-profit group Independent Diplomat, established by the former British diplomat Carne Ross.

=== Drug policy reform ===
Soros has funded worldwide efforts to promote drug policy reform. In 2008, Soros donated $400,000 to help fund a successful ballot measure in Massachusetts known as the Massachusetts Sensible Marijuana Policy Initiative which decriminalized possession of less than 1 oz (28 g) of marijuana in the state. Soros has also funded similar measures in California, Alaska, Oregon, Washington, Colorado, Nevada and Maine. Among the drug decriminalization groups that have received funding from Soros are the Lindesmith Center and Drug Policy Foundation. Soros donated $1.4 million to publicity efforts to support California's Proposition 5 in 2008, a failed ballot measure that would have expanded drug rehabilitation programs as alternatives to prison for persons convicted of non-violent drug-related offenses.

In October 2010, Soros donated $1 million to support California's Proposition 19.

According to remarks in an interview in October 2009, it is Soros's opinion that marijuana is less addictive but not appropriate for use by children and students. He himself has not used marijuana for years. Soros has been a major financier of the Drug Policy Alliance – an organization that promotes cannabis legalization – with roughly $5 million in annual contributions from one of his foundations.

=== Death and dying ===
The Project on Death in America, active from 1994 to 2003, was one of the Open Society Institute's projects, which sought to "understand and transform the culture and experience of dying and bereavement". In 1994, Soros delivered a speech in which he reported that he had offered to help his mother, a member of the right-to-die advocacy organization Hemlock Society, commit suicide. In the same speech, he also endorsed the Oregon Death with Dignity Act, proceeding to help fund its advertising campaign.

== Conspiracy theories and threats ==
Because of his Jewish identity, wealth, and philanthropy, Soros has been described as "the perfect code word" for conspiracy theories that unite antisemitism and Islamophobia. One prominent Soros-related conspiracy theory is that he is behind the 2015 European migrant crisis or importing migrants to European countries. The Hungarian government spent millions of dollars on a poster campaign demonizing Soros. According to anthropologist Ivan Kalmar, "Many of his most outspoken enemies inside and outside Hungary saw him as leading an international cabal that included other Jews such as the Rothschilds, as well as Freemasons and Illuminati".

=== Attempted assassination ===
A pipe bomb was placed in the mailbox at Soros's home in Katonah, New York, on October 22, 2018, as part of the October 2018 United States mail bombing attempts. The package was discovered by a caretaker, who removed it and notified authorities. It was photographed and exploded by the FBI, which launched an investigation. For several days afterward, similar bombs were mailed to Hillary Clinton, Barack Obama, and other Democrats and liberals.

On October 26, 2018, Cesar Sayoc Jr. was arrested in Aventura, Florida, on suspicion of mailing the bombs. In August 2019, Sayoc was sentenced to 20 years in prison for mailing 16 pipe bombs to 13 victims. None of the devices exploded.

== Political and economic views ==
=== Reflexivity, financial markets, and economic theory ===
Soros's writings focus heavily on the concept of reflexivity, where the biases of individuals enter into market transactions, potentially changing the fundamentals of the economy. Soros argues that different principles apply in markets depending on whether they are in a "near to equilibrium" or a "far from equilibrium" state. He argues that, when markets are rising or falling rapidly, they are typically marked by disequilibrium rather than equilibrium, and that the conventional economic theory of the market (the "efficient market hypothesis") does not apply in these situations. Soros has popularized the concepts of dynamic disequilibrium, static disequilibrium, and near-equilibrium conditions. He has stated that his own financial success has been attributable to the edge accorded by his understanding of the action of the reflexive effect. Reflexivity is based on three main ideas:

- Reflexivity is best observed under special conditions where investor bias grows and spreads throughout the investment arena. Examples of factors that may give rise to this bias include (a) equity leveraging or (b) the trend-following habits of speculators.
- Reflexivity appears intermittently since it is most likely to be revealed under certain conditions; i.e., the character of the equilibrium process is best considered in terms of probabilities.
- Investors' observation of and participation in the capital markets may at times influence valuations and fundamental conditions or outcomes.

A recent example (circa 2008) of reflexivity in modern financial markets is that of the debt and equity of housing markets. Lenders began to make more money available to more people in the 1990s to buy houses. More people bought houses with this larger amount of money, thus increasing the prices of these houses. Lenders looked at their balance sheets, which not only showed that they had made more loans, but that the collaterals backing the loans – the value of the houses – had gone up (because more money was chasing the same amount of housing, relatively). Thus they lent out more money because their balance sheets looked good, and prices rose higher still.

This was further amplified by public policy. In the US, home loans were guaranteed by the Federal government. Many national governments saw home ownership as a positive outcome and so introduced grants for first-time home buyers and other financial subsidies, such as the exemption of a primary residence from capital gains taxation. These further encouraged house purchases, leading to further price rises and further relaxation of lending standards.

The concept of reflexivity attempts to explain why markets moving from one equilibrium state to another tend to overshoot or undershoot. Soros's theories were originally dismissed by economists, but received more attention after the 2008 financial crisis, becoming the focus of an issue of the Journal of Economic Methodology.

The notion of reflexivity provides an explanation of the theories of complexity economics, as developed at the Santa Fe Institute, although Soros had not publicized his views at the time the discipline was originally developed there in the 1980s.

=== Reflexivity in politics ===
Although the primary manifestation of the reflexive process that Soros discusses is its effects in the financial markets, he has also explored its effects in politics. He has stated that whereas the greatest threats to the "open society" in the past were from communism and fascism (as discussed in The Open Society and Its Enemies by his mentor Karl Popper), the largest current threat is from market fundamentalism.

He has suggested that the contemporary domination of world politics and world trade by the United States is a reflexive phenomenon, insofar as the success of military and financial coercion feeds back to encourage increasingly intense applications of the same policies to the point where they will eventually become unsustainable.

=== View of problems in the free market system ===
Soros argues that the current system of financial speculation undermines healthy economic development in many underdeveloped countries. He blames many of the world's problems on the failures inherent in what he characterizes as market fundamentalism.

==== Market predictions ====
Soros's book The New Paradigm for Financial Markets (May 2008), described a "superbubble" that had built up over the past 25 years and was ready to collapse. This was the third in a series of books he has written that have predicted disaster. As he states:

I have a record of crying wolf ... I did it first in The Alchemy of Finance (in 1987), then in The Crisis of Global Capitalism (in 1998), and now in this book. So it's three books predicting disaster. [After] the boy cried wolf three times ... the wolf really came.

He ascribes his own success to being able to recognize when his predictions are wrong:

I'm only rich because I know when I'm wrong ... I basically have survived by recognizing my mistakes. I very often used to get backaches due to the fact that I was wrong. Whenever you are wrong you have to fight or [take] flight. When [I] make the decision, the backache goes away.

In February 2009, Soros said the world financial system had in effect disintegrated, adding that there was no prospect of a near-term resolution to the crisis. "We witnessed the collapse of the financial system ... It was placed on life support, and it's still on life support. There's no sign that we are anywhere near a bottom."

In January 2016, at an economic forum in Sri Lanka, Soros predicted a financial crisis akin to the 2008 financial crisis based on the state of the global currency, stock and commodity markets as well as the sinking Chinese yuan.

=== Views on antisemitism and Israel ===
When asked what he thought about Israel, in The New Yorker, Soros replied: "I don't deny Jews the right to a national existence – but I don't want to be a part of it". According to hacked emails released in 2016, Soros's Open Society Foundation has a self-described objective of "challenging Israel's racist and anti-democratic policies" in international forums, in part by questioning Israel's reputation as a democracy. He has funded NGOs which have been actively critical of Israeli policies including groups that campaign for the Boycott, Divestment and Sanctions movement against Israel.

Speaking before a 2003 conference of the Jewish Funders Network, Soros said that the administrations of George W. Bush in the U.S. and Ariel Sharon in Israel, and even the unintended consequences of some of his own actions, were partially contributing to a new European antisemitism. Soros, citing accusations that he was one of the "Jewish financiers" who, in antisemitic terms, "ruled the world by proxy", suggested that, if the direction of those policies were changed, then antisemitism would diminish. Abraham Foxman, national director of the Anti-Defamation League later said that Soros's comments held a simplistic view, were counterproductive, biased and a bigoted perception of the situation, and "blamed the victim" when holding Jews responsible for antisemitism. Jewish philanthropist Michael Steinhardt, who arranged for Soros's appearance at the conference, clarified that "George Soros does not think Jews should be hated any more than they deserve to be". Soros has also said that Jews can overcome antisemitism by "giv[ing] up on the tribalness".

In a subsequent article for The New York Review of Books, Soros emphasized that:

I do not subscribe to the myths propagated by enemies of Israel and I am not blaming Jews for anti-Semitism. Anti-Semitism predates the birth of Israel. Neither Israel's policies nor the critics of those policies should be held responsible for anti-Semitism. At the same time, I do believe that attitudes toward Israel are influenced by Israel's policies, and attitudes toward the Jewish community are influenced by the pro-Israel lobby's success in suppressing divergent views.

In 2017, Israeli businessman Beny Steinmetz filed a $10-million lawsuit against Soros, alleging that Soros had influenced the government of Guinea to freeze Steinmetz's company BSG Resources out of iron ore mining contracts in the African country due to "long-standing animus toward the state of Israel". Steinmetz claims that Soros engaged in a "smear" campaign against him and his companies and blames Soros for scrutiny of him by American, Israeli, Swiss, and Guinean authorities. Soros called Steinmetz's suit "frivolous and entirely false" and said that it was "a desperate PR stunt meant to deflect attention from BSGR's mounting legal problems across multiple jurisdictions".

During a 2003 award ceremony for author Imre Kertész, Soros said that the victims of violence and abuse were becoming "perpetrators of violence", suggesting that this model explained Israel's behavior towards the Palestinians, which led to walkouts and Soros being booed.

In July 2017, a billboard campaign backed by then-Hungarian Prime Minister Viktor Orbán, which was considered to be antisemitic by the country's Jewish groups, vilified Soros as an enemy of the state, using the slogan "Let's not allow Soros to have the last laugh". The campaign was estimated to have cost 5.7bn forints (then US$21 million). According to the Israeli ambassador to Hungary, the campaign "evokes sad memories but also sows hatred and fear", a reference to Hungary's role in the deportation of 500,000 Jews during the Holocaust. Lydia Gall of Human Rights Watch asserted that it was reminiscent of Nazi posters during the Second World War featuring "'the laughing Jew'". Orbán and his government's representative said they had a "zero tolerance" of antisemitism, explaining the posters were aiming to persuade voters that Soros was a "national security risk". Hours later, in an apparent attempt to ally Israel with Hungary, Israel's Ministry of Foreign Affairs issued a "clarification" to denounce Soros, claiming that he "continuously undermines Israel's democratically elected governments by funding organizations that defame the Jewish state and seek to deny it the right to defend itself".

Soros's son Alexander said in an interview that his father cares about Israel, and that he "would like to see Israel in Yitzhak Rabin's image. His views are more or less the common views in Meretz and in the Labor Party." According to Alexander, Soros supports a two-state solution. The younger Soros recounts that after his bar mitzvah in 1998, his father told him: "If you're serious about being Jewish, you might want to consider immigrating to Israel".

In a 2018 interview with The New York Times, when asked why his father fights for an open society, Alex Soros replied that in a non-Jewish state, a Jew can only feel safe when other minorities are protected, which is one of the most important driving forces why his father has been active in his philanthropy:

But he had always "identified firstly as a Jew", and his philanthropy was ultimately an expression of his Jewish identity, in that he felt a solidarity with other minority groups and also because he recognized that a Jew could only truly be safe in a world in which all minorities were protected. Explaining his father's motives, he said, "The reason you fight for an open society is because that's the only society that you can live in, as a Jew—unless you become a nationalist and only fight for your own rights in your own state".

In December 2023, Israel's ambassador to the United Nations, Gilad Erdan, accused Soros of supporting pro-Palestinian organizations "that seek the destruction of the State of Israel as a Jewish state". Soros's son Alexander dismissed these accusations as "distorted and dishonest right-wing attacks."

=== Views on the U.S. ===
On November 11, 2003, in an interview with The Washington Post, Soros said that removing President George W. Bush from office was the "central focus of my life" and "a matter of life and death". He said he would sacrifice his entire fortune to defeat Bush "if someone guaranteed it". Soros gave $3 million to the Center for American Progress, $2.5 million to MoveOn.org, and $20 million to America Coming Together. These groups worked to support Democrats in the 2004 election. On September 28, 2004, he dedicated more money to the campaign and kicked off his own multistate tour with a speech, "Why We Must Not Re-elect President Bush", delivered at the National Press Club in Washington, D.C. The online transcript of this speech received many views after Dick Cheney accidentally referred to FactCheck.org as "factcheck.com" in the vice presidential debate, causing the owner of that domain to redirect all traffic to Soros's site.

His 2003 book, The Bubble of American Supremacy, was a forthright critique of the Bush administration's "War on Terror" as misconceived and counterproductive, and a polemic against the re-election of Bush. He explains the title in the closing chapter by pointing out the parallels in this political context with the self-reinforcing reflexive processes that generate bubbles in stock prices.

When Soros was asked in 2006 about his statement in The Age of Fallibility that "the main obstacle to a stable and just world order is the United States", he responded that "it happens to coincide with the prevailing opinion in the world. And I think that's rather shocking for Americans to hear. The United States sets the agenda for the world. And the rest of the world has to respond to that agenda. By declaring a 'war on terror' after September 11, we set the wrong agenda for the world ... When you wage war, you inevitably create innocent victims."

In 2017, Soros described Donald Trump as a con man, and predicted Trump would fail because he believed Trump's ideas were self-contradictory. Soros also said he believed Trump was preparing for a trade war and expected financial markets to do poorly.

=== Views on Europe ===
In October 2011, Soros drafted an open letter entitled "As concerned Europeans we urge Eurozone leaders to unite", in which he calls for a stronger economic government for Europe using federal means (Common EU treasury, common fiscal supervision, etc.) and warns against the danger of nationalistic solutions to the Great Recession. The letter was co-signed by Javier Solana, Daniel Cohn-Bendit, Andrew Duff, Emma Bonino, Massimo D'Alema, and Vaira Vīķe-Freiberga.

In October 2015, Soros criticized Hungarian prime minister Viktor Orbán and his handling of the 2015 European migrant crisis: "His plan treats the protection of national borders as the objective and the refugees as an obstacle. Our plan treats the protection of refugees as the objective and national borders as the obstacle."

Soros expected that Brexit would fail and the Premiership of Theresa May would last only a short time. Soros is opposed to Brexit and donated £400,000 to the anti-Brexit 'Best for Britain' group. Soros also hosted a dinner for Conservative donors at his London home to encourage them to follow his lead. Soros's Open Society Foundations also donated a total of £303,000 to two pro-EU organizations, the European Movement UK and Scientists for EU, and a center-right think-tank, Bright Blue.

In 2018, Soros highlighted that Europe faces major challenges related to immigration, austerity, and nations leaving the EU. He holds that Europe is facing an existential crisis, in view of the rise of populism, the refugee crisis and a growing rift between Europe and the United States. Soros has also stated that "the euro has many unresolved problems" which "must not be allowed to destroy the European Union". He advocated replacing the notion of a multi-speed Europe by the aim of a "multi-track Europe" that would allow member states a wider variety of choices.

=== Views European-African relations ===
In view of the possibility of a further increase of the number of refugees from Africa to Europe, Soros proposes that the European Union devise a "Marshall Plan for Africa" (see Marshall Plan), fostering education and employment in Africa in order to reduce emigration.

=== Views on China ===
In 2010, Soros has expressed concern about the growth of Chinese economic and political power, saying, "China has risen very rapidly by looking out for its own interests ... They have now got to accept responsibility for world order and the interests of other people as well". Regarding the political gridlock in America, he said, "Today, China has not only a more vigorous economy but actually a better functioning government than the United States". In July 2015, Soros stated that a "strategic partnership between the US and China could prevent the evolution of two power blocks that may be drawn into military conflict". In January 2016, during an interview at the World Economic Forum (WEF) in Davos, Soros stated that "[a] hard landing is practically unavoidable". Chinese state media responded by stating "Soros' challenge to the RMB and Hong Kong dollar are doomed to fail, without any doubt".

In January 2019, Soros used his annual speech at the World Economic Forum, in Davos, to label Xi Jinping, General Secretary of the Chinese Communist Party and President of China, as the "most dangerous opponent of open societies", saying: "China is not the only authoritarian regime in the world but it is the wealthiest, strongest and technologically most advanced". He also urged the United States not to allow the Chinese technology companies Huawei and ZTE to dominate the 5G telecommunications market as this would present an "unacceptable security risk for the rest of the world". Soros also criticized the newest form of China's Big Brother-like system of mass surveillance called the social credit system, saying it would give Xi "total control" over the people of China. Additionally, Soros is very critical of American companies that ignore Chinese human rights violations for business reasons, for example slamming BlackRock's decision to invest big in China as detrimental to worldwide democracy and US national security.

=== Views on Russia and Ukraine ===
In May 2014, Soros told CNN's Fareed Zakaria: "I set up a foundation in Ukraine before Ukraine became independent from Russia. And the foundation has been functioning ever since and played an important part in events now."

In January 2015, he said that "Europe needs to wake up and recognize that it is under attack from Russia" and urged Western countries to expand economic sanctions against Russia for its support of separatists in eastern Ukraine.

In January 2015, Soros called on the European Union to give $50 billion of bailout money to Ukraine.

In July 2015, Soros stated that Putin's annexation of Crimea was a challenge to the "prevailing world order", specifically the European Union. He hypothesized that Putin wants to "destabilize all of Ukraine by precipitating a financial and political collapse for which he can disclaim responsibility, while avoiding occupation of a part of eastern Ukraine, which would then depend on Russia for economic support". In November 2015, Russia banned the Open Society Foundations (OSF) and the Open Society Institute (OSI)—two pro-democracy charities founded by Soros—stating they posed a "threat to the foundations of the constitutional system of the Russian Federation and the security of the state". In January 2016, 53 books related to Soros's "Renewal of Humanitarian Education" program were withdrawn at the Vorkuta Mining and Economic College in the Komi Republic, with 427 additional books seized for shredding. A Russian intergovernmental letter released in December 2015 stated that Soros's charities were "forming a perverted perception of history and making ideological directives, alien to Russian ideology, popular". Most of these books were published with funds donated by Soros's charities.

In May 2022, Soros stated that the Russian invasion of Ukraine may be the start of "a third world war" and that Putin must be defeated "as soon as possible". He also stated that "Other issues that concern all of humanity—fighting pandemics and climate change, avoiding nuclear war, maintaining global institutions—have had to take a back seat to that struggle. That's why I say civilization may not survive."

=== Views on India and Narendra Modi ===
In February 2023, Soros criticized Indian Prime Minister Narendra Modi for his alleged Islamophobia, cronyism and authoritarianism, saying that "India is...a democracy. But its leader, Narendra Modi, is no democrat. Inciting violence against Muslims was an important factor in his meteoric rise." Modi's Bharatiya Janata Party accused Soros of trying to undermine Indian democracy. Indian foreign minister S. Jaishankar claimed that Soros is a "dangerous" person.

== Wealth and philanthropy ==
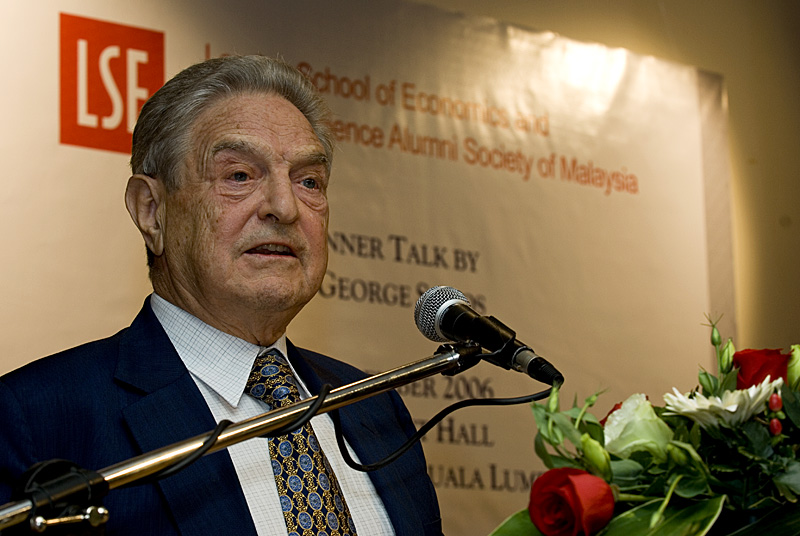
Soros speaks to the LSE alumni society in Malaysia.

As of March 2020, Forbes magazine listed Soros as the 162nd richest person in the world, with a net worth of $8.3 billion. He has also donated 64% of his original fortune, of which more than $15 billion has been distributed through his Open Society Foundations (an international grant making network that supports advancing justice, education, public health and independent media). Forbes has called him the most generous giver (when measured as a percentage of net worth).

In September 2020, Forbes deputy wealth editor Jennifer Wang awarded Soros a perfect philanthropy score of 5, the highest possible rating; placing him among an exclusive group of just ten Forbes 400 members, alongside Warren Buffett, John Arnold, Eli Broad, and others who have each given away at least 20% of their fortune.

Soros has been active as a philanthropist since the 1970s, when he began providing funds to help Black students attend the University of Cape Town in apartheid South Africa, and began funding dissident movements behind the Iron Curtain.

In February 1994, Herb Sturz was asked by Aryeh Neier (then president of Open Society Institute) and Soros to help improve housing in post-apartheid South Africa. In 1995, the National Urban and Reconstruction and Housing Agency (NURCHA) was created as a joint venture between the South African Government and the Soros Economic Development Fund (SEDF). Both groups contributed $5 million for operating expenses. The effort had a slow start due to South African banking resistance. Then Soros pledged $50 million in loan guarantees, conditional to an additional $250 million being raised across the world from other contributors. By 2001, NURCHA had built 70,000 homes and by 2007 had built 200,000 homes. Almost all of the loans to builders, who were black South Africans, were repaid. After more than two decades, NURCHA was still operating and 100% managed by the state of South Africa.

Soros's philanthropic funding includes efforts to promote non-violent democratization in the post-communist states. These efforts, mostly in Central and Eastern Europe, occur primarily through the Open Society Foundations (originally Open Society Institute or OSI) and national Soros Foundations, which sometimes go under other names (such as the Stefan Batory Foundation in Poland). As of 2003, PBS estimated that he had given away a total of $4 billion. The OSI says it has spent about $500 million annually in recent years.

In 2003, former Federal Reserve chairman Paul Volcker wrote in the foreword of Soros's book The Alchemy of Finance:

George Soros has made his mark as an enormously successful speculator, wise enough to largely withdraw when still way ahead of the game. The bulk of his enormous winnings is now devoted to encouraging transitional and emerging nations to become "open societies", open not only in the sense of freedom of commerce but—more important—tolerant of new ideas and different modes of thinking and behavior.

Time magazine in 2007 cited two specific projects—$100 million toward Internet infrastructure for regional Russian universities, and $50 million for the Millennium Promise to eradicate extreme poverty in Africa—noting that Soros had given $742 million to projects in the U.S., and given away a total of more than $7 billion.

Other notable projects have included aid to scientists and universities throughout central and eastern Europe, help to civilians during the siege of Sarajevo, and Transparency International. Soros also pledged an endowment of €420 million to the Central European University (CEU).

According to National Review Online the Open Society Institute gave $20,000 in September 2002 to the Defense Committee of Lynne Stewart, the lawyer who has defended controversial, poor, and often unpopular defendants in court and was sentenced to 2 1/3 years in prison for "providing material support for a terrorist conspiracy" via a press conference for a client. An OSI spokeswoman said "it appeared to us at that time that there was a right-to-counsel issue worthy of our support", but claimed later requests for support were declined.

In September 2006, Soros pledged $50 million to the Millennium Promise, led by economist Jeffrey Sachs to provide educational, agricultural, and medical aid to help villages in Africa enduring poverty. The New York Times termed this endeavor a "departure" for Soros whose philanthropic focus had been on fostering democracy and good government, but Soros noted that most poverty resulted from bad governance.

In May 2011, Soros donated $60 million to Bard College, establishing the Bard College Center for Civic Engagement.

Soros played a role in the peaceful transition from communism to democracy in Hungary (1984–89) and provided a substantial endowment to Central European University in Budapest. The Open Society Foundations has active programs in more than 60 countries around the world with total expenditures currently averaging approximately $600 million a year.

On October 17, 2017, it was announced that Soros had transferred $18 billion to the Open Society Foundations. In October 2018, Soros donated $2 million to the Wikimedia Foundation via the Wikimedia Endowment program.

In January 2020, Soros announced a $1 billion endowment donation at the World Economic Forum, establishing the Open Society University Network a global network of educational institutions in partnership with Bard College and the Central European University. Bard College president Leon Botstein serves as chancellor of the Open Society University Network.

In July 2020, Soros's Foundations announced plans to give $220 million in grants for racial justice groups, criminal justice reform and civic engagement.

In July 2020, Soros donated $100 million to Bard College, to strengthen and expand Bard's Center for Civic Engagement initiatives, and its leadership role as a founding partner of the Open Society University Network.

In April 2021, Soros pledged $500 million to the endowment of Bard College. The donation sits among the largest ever made to higher education in the United States. Following the $500 million donation Soros donated $25 million to the Center for Curatorial Studies at Bard College in August 2021, as well as an additional $25 million donation to Bard in September 2022.

== Personal life ==
Soros has been married three times and divorced twice. In 1960, he married Annaliese Witschak (1934–2025). Annaliese was an ethnic German immigrant, who had been orphaned during the war. Although she was not Jewish, she was well-liked by Soros's parents, as she had also experienced the privation and displacement brought about by World War II. They divorced in 1983. They had three children:

- Robert Daniel Soros (born 1963): The founder of the Central European University in Budapest, as well as a network of foundations in Eastern Europe. In 1992, he married Melissa Robin Schiff at the Temple Emanu-El in New York City. The Rabbi Dr. David Posner officiated the ceremony.
- Andrea Soros Colombel (born June 11, 1965): The founder and president of Trace Foundation, established in 1993 to promote the cultural continuity and sustainable development of Tibetan communities within China. She is also a founding partner and member of the board of directors of the Acumen Fund, a global venture fund that employs an entrepreneurial approach in addressing the problems of global poverty She is married to Eric Colombel (born October 26, 1963).
- Jonathan Tivadar Soros (born September 10, 1970): A hedge fund manager and political donor. In 2012, he co-founded Friends of Democracy, a super PAC dedicated to reducing the influence of money in politics. In 1997, he married Jennifer Ann Allan (born November 26, 1969).

In 1983, George Soros married Susan Weber. They divorced in 2005. They have two children:

- Alexander Soros (born 1985): Alexander has gained prominence for his donations to social and political causes, focusing his philanthropic efforts on "progressive causes that might not have widespread support." Alexander led the list of student political donors in the 2010 election cycle. Alex married Huma Abedin in June 2025.
- Gregory James Soros (born 1988), artist.

As a child, Soros fantasized about being a god. In his book Underwriting Democracy, he wrote, "If truth be known, I carried some rather potent messianic fantasies with me from childhood, which I felt I had to control, otherwise they might get me in trouble." He later elaborated on that passage in an interview saying, "It is a sort of disease when you consider yourself some kind of god, the creator of everything, but I feel comfortable about it now since I began to live it out."

In a 1998 interview with CBS News, Soros said he was not religious and does not believe in God.

In 2008, Soros met Tamiko Bolton; they married on September 21, 2013. His older brother, Paul Soros, a private investor and philanthropist, died on June 15, 2013. As of 2022, Soros owned homes on Fifth Avenue in Manhattan, in The Hamptons on Long Island, and in Katonah, New York, within Westchester County.

In December 2023, Soros was swatted during a period of similar harassment targeting American political figures.

== Honors and awards ==
Soros has received honorary doctoral degrees from the New School for Social Research in New York, the University of Oxford in 1980, the Corvinus University of Budapest, and a Doctor of Humane Letters from Yale University in 1991. He received an honorary laurea degree in economics from the University of Bologna in 1995.

In 1998, the President of the Republic of Estonia, Lennart Meri, awarded him the Order of the Cross of Terra Mariana, First Class.

In 2005, Soros was a minority partner in a group that tried to buy the Washington Nationals, a Major League baseball team. Some Republican lawmakers suggested that they might move to revoke Major League Baseball's antitrust exemption if Soros bought the team. In 2008, Soros's name was associated with AS Roma, an Italian association football team, but the club was not sold. Soros was a financial backer of Washington Soccer L.P., the group that owned the operating rights to Major League Soccer club D.C. United when the league was founded in 1995, but the group lost these rights in 2000. On August 21, 2012, BBC reported SEC filings showing Soros acquired roughly a 2% stake in English football club Manchester United through the purchase of 3 million of the club's Class-A shares.

In 2008, Soros was inducted into Institutional Investors Alpha's Hedge Fund Manager Hall of Fame along with Alfred Jones, Bruce Kovner, David Swensen, Jack Nash, James Simons, Julian Roberston, Kenneth Griffin, Leon Levy, Louis Bacon, Michael Steinhardt, Paul Tudor Jones, Seth Klarman, and Steven A. Cohen.

In 2009, Chilean President Michelle Bachelet awarded him the Order of Bernardo O'Higgins as a gesture of gratitude for his "unwavering commitment to democracy and open societies."

In January 2014, Soros was ranked number 1 in LCH Investments list of top 20 managers having posting gains of almost $42 billion since the launch of his Quantum Endowment Fund in 1973.

In July 2017, Soros was elected an Honorary Fellow of the British Academy (HonFBA), the United Kingdom's national academy for the humanities and social sciences.

Soros was the Financial Times Person of the Year for 2018, with the FT describing him as "a standard bearer for liberal democracy, an idea under siege from populists".

In April 2019, Soros was awarded the Ridenhour Prize for Courage. In his acceptance address Soros said: "In my native Hungary, the government of [Prime Minister] Viktor Orbán has turned me into the super villain of an alleged plot to destroy the supposed Christian identity of the Hungarian nation... [I] donate the prize money associated with this award to the Hungarian Spectrum, an online English-language publication that provides daily updates on Hungarian politics. It renders an important service by exposing to the world [in English] what Prime Minister Viktor Orbán is telling his own people [in Hungarian]. It [Hungarian Spectrum] deserves to be better known and supported."

In January 2025, United States President Joe Biden awarded Soros the Presidential Medal of Freedom.

== Publications and scholarship ==
=== Books authored or co-authored ===
- The Tragedy of the European Union: Disintegration or Revival? (PublicAffairs, 2014). ISBN 978-1-61039-421-5.
- Financial Turmoil in Europe and the United States: Essays (PublicAffairs, 2012). ISBN 978-1-61039-161-0.
- The Soros Lectures at the Central European University (PublicAffairs, 2010) ISBN 978-1-58648-885-7.
- The New Paradigm for Financial Markets: The Credit Crisis of 2008 and What it Means (PublicAffairs, 2008). ISBN 978-1-58648-683-9.
- The Age of Fallibility: Consequences of the War on Terror (PublicAffairs, 2006) ISBN 978-1-58648-359-3.
- Underwriting Democracy: Encouraging Free Enterprise and Democratic Reform Among the Soviets and in Eastern Europe (Free Press, 1991) ISBN 978-0-02-930285-9 (paperback; PublicAffairs, 2004; ISBN 978-1-58648-227-5).
- George Soros on Globalization (PublicAffairs, 2002) ISBN 978-1-58648-125-4 (paperback; PublicAffairs, 2005; ISBN 978-1-58648-278-7).
- The Bubble of American Supremacy: Correcting the Misuse of American Power (PublicAffairs, 2003) ISBN 978-1-58648-217-6 (paperback; PublicAffairs, 2004; ISBN 978-1-58648-292-3).
- Open Society: Reforming Global Capitalism (PublicAffairs, 2001) ISBN 978-1-58648-019-6.
- With Mark Amadeus Notturno, Science and the Open Society: The Future of Karl Popper's Philosophy (Central European University Press, 2000) ISBN 978-963-9116-69-6 (paperback: Central European University Press, 2000; ISBN 978-963-9116-70-2).
- The Crisis of Global Capitalism: Open Society Endangered. PublicAffairs. 1998. ISBN 978-1-891620-27-0..
- Soros on Soros: Staying Ahead of the Curve (John Wiley, 1995) ISBN 978-0-471-12014-8 (paperback; Wiley, 1995; ISBN 978-0-471-11977-7).
- Opening the Soviet System (Weidenfeld & Nicolson, 1990) ISBN 978-0-297-82055-0 (paperback: Perseus Books, 1996; ISBN 978-0-8133-1205-7).
- The Alchemy of Finance (Simon & Schuster, 1988) ISBN 978-0-671-66238-7 (paperback: Wiley, 2003; ISBN 978-0-471-44549-4).

=== Notable op-eds ===
- George Soros, "Why I support legal marijuana", The Wall Street Journal, October 26, 2010.
- George Soros, "The Crisis and the Euro", The New York Review of Books, August 19, 2010.
- George Soros, "Paulson Cannot be Allowed a Blank Cheque". Financial Times. September 24, 2008. Archived from the original on September 26, 2008., Financial Times, September 24, 2008.
- George Soros, "On Israel, America and AIPAC", The New York Review of Books, April 12, 2007.
- George Soros, "The Bubble of American Supremacy", The Atlantic, December 2003, also audio recording of this article via Assistive Media, read by Grover Gardner, 18 minutes.
- George Soros, "Soros on Brazil", Financial Times, August 13, 2002.
- George Soros, "Bitter Thoughts with Faith in Russia", Moskovskiye Novosti (Moscow News), translated from the Russian by Olga Kryazheva, February 27, 2000.
- George Soros, "The Capitalist Threat", The Atlantic Monthly, February 1997.

=== Television ===
- A half-hour Opinions television lecture by Soros was transmitted by Channel 4 on 1 August 1993, and published in The Times the following day as "Why Appeasement Must Not Have Another Chance".

== See also ==
- Forbes 400 – Annual list of wealthiest Americans
- Quincy Institute for Responsible Statecraft – American think tank (est. 2019)
- Scott Bessent – Former chief investment officer of Soros Fund Management
- Tides Foundation – American public charity and fiscal sponsor
