= Tivadar Soros =

Hungarian lawyer, writer and editor

- Soros Tivadar (after 1936)
- Soros c. 1930s
- Born: Theodor Schwartz; 7 April 1893; Nyírbakta, Transleithania, Austria-Hungary (modern-day Hungary)
- Died: 22 February 1968 (aged 74); New York, United States
- Alma mater: Franz Joseph University, Kolozsvár (now Cluj)
- Spouse: Erzsébet Szücs (m. 1924)
- Children: George; Paul
- Military career
- Allegiance: Austria-Hungary
- Branch: Austro-Hungarian Army
- Service years: 1914–1918
- Known for: Esperanto magazine editor, lawyer
- Conflicts: World War I: Eastern Front (POW)

Tivadar Soros (Esperanto: Teodoro Ŝvarc; born Theodor Schwartz; 7 April 1893 – 22 February 1968) was a Hungarian lawyer, author and editor. He is best known for being the father of billionaire George Soros and engineer Paul Soros.

He was born into an Orthodox Jewish family in Nyírbakta, Hungary, near the border with Ukraine. His father had a general store and sold farm equipment. When Tivadar was eight, his father moved the family to Nyiregyhaza, the regional center in north-eastern Hungary, providing a somewhat less isolated life experience.

He first met his wife Erzsébet when she was eleven years old during a visit to the home of her father Mor Szücs, a cousin of his own father.

He studied law at the Franz Joseph University in Kolozsvár (now Cluj-Napoca), in what was then Hungarian Transylvania.

Soros fought in World War I and spent years in a prison camp in Siberia before escaping. He founded the Esperanto literary magazine Literatura Mondo (Literary World) in 1922, having learned the language from a fellow soldier during the war, and edited it until 1924.

In 1936, Soros changed the family's surname from the German-Jewish "Schwartz" to "Soros", in an attempt to protect the family from Hungary's increasing antisemitism. Soros was said to like the new name because it is a palindrome and because of its meaning; in Hungarian, soros means "next"; in Esperanto it means "will soar".

Soros forged paperwork, giving the family's new alias, as the Germans occupied Hungary in 1944. The family fled to safe houses for nearly a year, until Soviet forces invaded the country.

Soros died of cancer in New York in 1968.

== Publications ==
- Modernaj Robinzonoj ("Modern Robinsons") (1923), a short account of his escape from a Russian prison camp, which was republished in 1999 by Esperanto publisher Bero and was translated into several languages, including English (Crusoes in Siberia, Mondial, 2010).
- Maskerado ĉirkaŭ la morto ("Masquerade around death") (1965), an autobiographical novel about Soros's experience during the Nazi occupation of Budapest. It has been translated into English (Maskerado: Dancing Around Death London: Canongate, 2000), French, Hungarian, Italian, Polish, Czech, Russian, German and Turkish.
