= Soros Fund Management =

American private investment firm

Soros Fund Management, LLC
- Type: Private
- Industry: Financial services
- Founded: 1970; 56 years ago in New York City, U.S.
- Founder: George Soros
- Headquarters: 250 West 55th Street, New York City, United States
- Area served: Worldwide
- Key people: George Soros (chairman); Dawn Fitzpatrick (CEO)
- AUM: US$25 billion (2023)
- Website: sorosfundmgmt.com

Soros Fund Management, LLC is an American privately held investment management firm. Founded in 1970 as a hedge fund by George Soros, since the early 2010s it is structured as a family office.

== History ==
=== Founding ===
The company was founded by George Soros and his former business partner Jim Rogers in 1970. Before starting the business, Soros and Rogers worked together at the investment bank Arnhold and S. Bleichroeder.

=== 21st century ===
The firm acquired a stake in Lehman Brothers just prior to its failure in 2008. In 2009, Soros Fund Management partnered with six other hedge funds to acquire IndyMac Bank for $13.9 billion, thereby gaining control of an estimated $160 billion in bank loans, investments, and deposits. In 2010, the company was reported to have created $32 billion in profits since 1973, making it one of the top profit-making hedge funds in the industry. The fund was reported to be one of the most profitable firms in the hedge fund industry, averaging a 20% annual rate of return over four decades. As of 2023, Soros Fund Management had US$25 billion in AUM.

In 2011, the firm was reported to have $27.9 billion in assets under management and was ranked sixth on Institutional Investor's Hedge Fund 100 list. That same year, the company partnered with Silver Lake Partners and created fund called Silver Lake Kraftwerk whose focus was investing in natural resource and energy companies. In July 2011, the fund announced plans to return just under $1 billion to investors by the end of 2011 to avoid reporting requirements under the Dodd-Frank reform act and to focus on family investments. That month, the company's chief investment officer Keith Anderson, co-founder of BlackRock left the firm.

In September 2016, Soros Fund Management advised a private investment fund tied to Quantum Strategic Partners, which injected the bulk of $305 million into SolarCity, a producer of solar panels. The flow of cash allowed Elon Musk, chairman of Tesla Motors and SolarCity, to purchase SolarCity and merge it with Tesla. In June 2018, the firm was reported to own 15% of Justify, the horse that won the 2018 Preakness Stakes, Kentucky Derby and Belmont Stakes, through the international breeding and racing operation of SF Bloodstock and SF Racing Group. According to The Wall Street Journal, Soros Fund Management gained 8.9% in 2017 and 0.9% in 2018. In the first quarter of 2019, the fund had gained 1.9%.

In May 2019, it was announced that Soros Fund Management had built up a 3% stake in Swiss asset manager GAM. In June 2019, Soros Fund Management led an investment in Vice Media for $250 million. In August 2019, Soros Fund Management increased its stake In Manolete Partners Plc To 11.67%. As of August, 2019, Soros Fund Management's most significant holdings were Liberty Broadband, Vici Properties, and Caesars Entertainment.

In January 2020, George Soros announced at the World Economic Forum that he would commit $1 billion to the launch of an international university, The Open Society University Network, for research and education on climate change and dealing with authoritarian governments. In April 2020, Amply Power, a company that provides charging solutions for fleets, received its series A funding of $13.2 million from Soros Fund Management, Siemens, Congruent Ventures, PeopleFund, and Obvious Ventures. In November 2020, Soros Fund Management disclosed that it holds 1% Class A shares in Palantir Technologies and announced that it has begun selling its shares as allowed because it disagrees with Palantir's business practices. In a statement to CNBC, the company said, "SFM made this investment at a time when the negative social consequences of big data were less understood. SFM would not make an investment in Palantir today."

In February 2024, Soros Fund Management emerged as the largest creditor in Audacy's prepackaged Chapter 11 bankruptcy proceedings, holding over $400 million of its highest-ranking debt. This debt is planned to be converted into equity in the restructured company, making Soros a significant shareholder. Audacy views this development as a positive sign, interpreting it as a "vote of confidence" in the company's future. In November 2024, Soros Fund Management closed its Hong Kong Office.

== Operations ==
Soros Fund Management is the primary adviser for the Quantum Group of Funds; a family of funds in international investments. The company invests in public equity and fixed income markets worldwide, as well as foreign exchange, currency, and commodity markets, and private equity and venture capital funds. The company is reported to have significant investments in transportation, energy, retail, financial, and other industries. Robert Soros stepped down as deputy chairman and president in June 2017. David Milich assumed most of his duties. In 2017, Dawn Fitzpatrick replaced Ted Burdick as chief investment officer. In the 2016 election cycle, Soros Fund Management donated over $10 million to Hillary Clinton's presidential campaign through super PACs.

=== Quantum Group of Funds ===
The Quantum Group of Funds are privately owned hedge funds based in London, New York, Curaçao and the Cayman Islands. The funds were advised by George Soros through Soros Fund Management. Soros started the fund in 1973 in partnership with Jim Rogers. In 1987, the funds lost $800 million on Japanese stocks shortly before the 1987 October 19, 1987 stock market crash. In the week leading up to September 16, 1992, or "Black Wednesday," Quantum Funds earned $1.8 billion by shorting British pounds when the currency left the Exchange Rate Mechanism and buying German marks. This transaction earned Soros the title of "the Man Who Broke the Bank of England". Soros was later blamed for forcing sharp devaluations in Southeast Asian currencies. On February 14, 1994, the funds had a major loss of $600 million in one day betting against the Japanese yen. In 1998, the fund lost another US$2 billion in investments in Russia during the 1998 Russian financial crisis.

In 2000, the Quantum Fund lost its position as the largest hedge fund in the world when its assets under management changed from $10 billion to $4 billion in about a year. The fund's losses resulted from investments in technology stocks. That year, CEO Duncan Hennes and the managers of the Quantum Fund, Stanley Druckenmiller, and Quota Fund, Nicholas Roditi, resigned. The restructuring of Soros Fund Management was announced in a shareholder letter that outlined its plan to merge the Quantum Fund with the Quantum Emerging Growth Fund to form the Quantum Endowment Fund. The intention was to transform the Quantum Fund into a "lower-risk, less-speculative fund" administered by an outside adviser. In July 2011, to avoid having to register with the SEC, also meaning it would have comply with reporting requirements under the Dodd-Frank reform act, the Quantum Fund announced they would be turning the fund into a family investment group and returning all outside money to investors by the end of 2011. The fund is managing Soros' family money, as well as working with retail investors.

== See also ==
- Svyazinvest
