= Rock for the Rainforest =

Rock for the Rainforest is a biennial (formerly annual) benefit concert held by the Rainforest Foundation Fund and Rainforest Foundation US, hosted by the organizations' founders Sting and his wife Trudie Styler, since 1991. In addition to the annual flagship concert, Sting holds other concerts and hosts other types of events to benefit the Rainforest Foundation. In addition to Sting, regular performers at the event include Elton John, Billy Joel, and James Taylor.

The event holds the Guinness World Record for the largest environmental fundraising event. By 1996, the concerts had raised over $6,000,000; by 2000, more than $11,000,000; by 2004, more than $20,000,000. Money is raised through corporate sponsorships, individual and group ticket sales, and related events like a benefit dinner and silent auction.

The event, which so far has always been held at Carnegie Hall in Midtown Manhattan, is a "spring tradition in New York" and a "fixture on the Manhattan charity circuit." At the 1997 and 2006 events, the Empire State Building was lighted green on the night of the concert.

The concert funds projects that benefit the indigenous peoples of the world's rainforests. The Rainforest Foundation Fund supports projects by three independent national organizations: Rainforest Foundation Norway, Rainforest Foundation US, and Rainforest Foundation UK. Kayapo chief Raoni delivered a ten-minute speech in his native language at the first concert, which was subsequently translated into English for the audience.

== List of events ==
| Year | Location | Funds raised | Performers |
|---|---|---|---|
| 1991 | Carnegie Hall | $250,000 | Sting, Elton John, Antonio Carlos Jobim, Caetano Veloso, and Gilberto Gil |
| 1992 | Carnegie Hall | | Sting, Elton John, Natalie Cole, Don Henley and James Taylor, Whoopi Goldberg |
| 1993 | Carnegie Hall | $800,000 | Sting, James Taylor, George Michael, Tom Jones, Tina Turner, Bryan Adams, Herb Alpert, and Dustin Hoffman |
| 1994 | Carnegie Hall | $1,100,000 | Sting, Elton John, James Taylor, Whitney Houston, Larry Adler, Branford Marsalis, Aaron Neville, Luciano Pavarotti, Tammy Wynette, and Michael Kamen |
| 1995 | Carnegie Hall | | Sting, Elton John, James Taylor, Jon Bon Jovi, Jessye Norman, Geoffrey Oryema, Paul Simon, Billy Joel and Bruce Springsteen |
| 1996 | Carnegie Hall | | Sting, Elton John, Don Henley, James Taylor, Diana Ross, Robin Williams, Branford Marsalis |
| 1997 | Carnegie Hall | | Sting, Elton John, James Taylor, Lyle Lovett, Bobby McFerrin, Bonnie Raitt, Shawn Colvin and Stevie Wonder |
| 1998 | Carnegie Hall | | Sting, Rosie O'Donnell, Madonna, Elton John, Billy Joel, Joe Cocker, James Taylor, Emmylou Harris, Roberta Flack, Wynonna Judd, and Tsidii Leloka |
| 1999 | Carnegie Hall | | Sting, Elton John, James Taylor, Billy Joel, Tony Bennett, Ricky Martin and Bill Murray, Sandra Bernhard, Charles Aznavour |
| 2000 | Carnegie Hall | $2,500,000 | Sting, Stevie Wonder, Ricky Martin, James Taylor, Elton John, Billy Joel, Gladys Knight, Percy Sledge, Macy Gray, Sam Moore and The Impressions, Tom Jones, and Martha Reeves |
| 2002 | Carnegie Hall | | Sting, Elton John, James Taylor, Nina Simone, Lulu, Anoushka Shankar, Patti LaBelle, Jeff Beck, Wynonna Judd, Smokey Robinson, Ravi Shankar, Rebekah Del Rio |
| 2004 | Carnegie Hall | | Sting, James Taylor, Elton John, Billy Joel, Bette Midler, Little Jimmy Scott, Michael J. Fox, Antonio Banderas, and Melanie Griffith |
| 2006 | Carnegie Hall | $2,300,000 | Sting, Billy Joel, James Taylor, Lenny Kravitz, and Sheryl Crow |
| 2008 | Carnegie Hall | $2,000,000 | Sting, Billy Joel, James Taylor, Brian Wilson, Chris Botti, Feist, Roberto Alagna, Natalie Clein |
| 2010 | Carnegie Hall | $3,000,000 | Sting, Bruce Springsteen, Lady Gaga, Elton John, Mary J. Blige, Debbie Harry, Shirley Bassey, Nile Rodgers and Chic |
| 2014 | Carnegie Hall | | Sting, Elton John, James Taylor, Meryl Streep, Vince Gill, Rita Wilson, Bryn Terfel, Rosanne Cash, Bruno Mars, Jennifer Hudson |
| 2016 | Carnegie Hall | | Sting, Bruce Springsteen, James Taylor, Idina Menzel, Ronnie Spector, Darlene Love. Jennifer Nettles |
