= Rainforest Foundation =

Rainforest Foundation may refer to:

- Rainforest Foundation Fund, the U.S. parent organization of:
  - Rainforest Foundation Norway
  - Rainforest Foundation UK
  - Rainforest Foundation US

== See also ==
- The Rainforest Fund
