= List of Academy Award winners and nominees from Belgium =

This is a list of Belgian Academy Award winners and nominees. This list details the films and performances of Belgian actors and actresses that have either been nominated for, or have won an Academy Award (The Oscars). This list is current as of the 96th Academy Awards ceremony held on 10 March 2024.

== Best Actress ==
Year	Name	Film	Result	Notes
1954	Audrey Hepburn	Roman Holiday	Won	Hepburn was a Belgian-born English actress. First Belgian-born actress to be nominated for Best Actress.
1955	Audrey Hepburn	Sabrina	Nominated	Hepburn was a Belgian-born English actress. First Belgian-born actress to be nominated for Best Actress.
1960	Audrey Hepburn	The Nun's Story	Nominated	Hepburn was a Belgian-born English actress. First Belgian-born actress to be nominated for Best Actress.
1962	Audrey Hepburn	Breakfast at Tiffany's	Nominated	Hepburn was a Belgian-born English actress. First Belgian-born actress to be nominated for Best Actress.
1968	Audrey Hepburn	Wait Until Dark	Nominated	Hepburn was a Belgian-born English actress. First Belgian-born actress to be nominated for Best Actress.

Note: With her Best Actress nomination for the 2014 Belgian film Two Days, One Night, French actress Marion Cotillard became the first actor to be nominated for an Academy Award for a Belgian film.

== Best International Feature Film ==
Year	Film	Language	Result
1971	Peace in the Fields	French	Nominated
1989	The Music Teacher	French	Nominated
1993	Daens	Dutch/French	Nominated
1995	Farinelli	Italian/French	Nominated
2001	Everybody's Famous!	Dutch	Nominated
2012	Bullhead	Dutch	Nominated
2014	The Broken Circle Breakdown	Dutch	Nominated
2023	Close	French/Dutch	Nominated

== Best Animated Feature Film ==
Year	Film	Result	Notes
2004	The Triplets of Belleville	Nominated	Co-produced by Belgium, France, UK and Canada
2014	Ernest & Celestine	Nominated	Co-produced by Belgium, France and Luxembourg
2015	Song of the Sea	Nominated	Co-produced by Belgium, Ireland, Denmark, France and Luxembourg
2017	The Red Turtle	Nominated	Co-produced by Belgium, France and Japan
2024	Flow	Won	Co-produced by Belgium, Latvia, and France

== Best Documentary Film ==
Year	Film	Name	Result	Notes
1967	Le Volcan interdit (The Forbidden Volcano)	Haroun Tazieff	Nominated	
1979	Raoni	Jean-Pierre Dutilleux	Nominated	
2024	Soundtrack to a Coup d'Etat	Johan Grimonprez	Nominated	Shared with Daan Milius and Rémi Grellety

== Best Live Action Short Film ==
Year	Film	Name	Result	Notes
2003	Gridlock (aka Fait d'hiver)	Dirk Beliën; Anja Daelemans	Nominated	
2008	Argentine Tangos (aka Tanghi Argentini)	Guy Thys; Anja Daelemans	Nominated	
2013	Death of a Shadow	Tom Van Avermaet; Ellen De Waele	Nominated	
2020	A Sister	Delphine Girard; Jacques-Henri Bronckart	Nominated	

== Best Animated Short Film ==
Year	Film	Name	Result	Notes
1987	A Greek Tragedy (aka Een Griekse Tragedie)	Nicole van Goethem	Won	
2024	Beautiful Men	Nicolas Keppens; Brecht Van Elslande	Nominated	

== Best Cinematography ==
Year	Film	Name	Result	Notes
1981	Tess	Ghislain Cloquet	Won	Ghislain Cloquet was a Belgian-born French cinematographer. He was born in Antwerp, Belgium in 1924 and became a French citizen in 1940.

== Jean Hersholt Humanitarian Award ==
Year	Name	Status	Notes
1993	Audrey Hepburn	Won	Hepburn died on January 20, 1993. On March 29, 1993, she received the award posthumously, which was voted for prior to her death. It was accepted on her behalf by her son, Sean Ferrer.

== Scientific and Engineering Academy Award ==
Year	Category	Name	Result	Notes
2024	Academy of Motion Picture Arts and Sciences’ Scientific and Technical Awards	Wouter D’Oosterlinck, Goran Stojmenovik and Peter Janssens	Won	for the development of the Barco RGB laser projector

== Nominations and Winners ==
No. of wins	No. of nominations
5	25

== See also ==
- Cinema of Belgium
- List of Belgian submissions for the Academy Award for Best Foreign Language Film
