= Rainforest Foundation UK =

- Founded: 1989
- Type: Non-governmental organization
- Purpose: Human Rights, Environmentalism
- Location: London, United Kingdom
- Region served: Africa and South America
- Method: research, participatory mapping, advocacy, field work
- Key people: Trudie Styler and Sting, founders Joe Eisen, Executive Director; Lucy Claridge, Chair of the Board of Trustees
- Website: rainforestfoundationuk.org

The Rainforest Foundation UK (RFUK) is a non-profit NGO working in Africa and South America. It is one of the first international organizations to support the indigenous peoples of the world's rainforests in their efforts to protect their environment and fulfill their rights to land, life and livelihood. The Foundation aims to protect rainforests by securing the land rights of indigenous peoples and other forest-dependent communities. It also campaigns internationally on issues such as industrial logging, climate change, agricultural expansion and nature conservation.

It forms part of the Rainforest Foundation network, with independent sister organizations in the United States and Norway: the Rainforest Foundation US and the Rainforest Foundation Norway.

== History ==
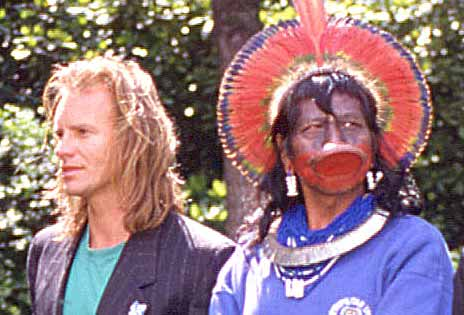
Sting and the Chief Raoni in 1989 in Paris.

The Rainforest Foundation was first founded in 1989 by Sting and his wife Trudie Styler after the indigenous leader of the Kayapo people of Brazil, the Chief Raoni made a personal request to them to help his community protect their lands and culture. The Rainforest Foundation's initial project was successful in coordinating the first ever privately funded demarcation of indigenous land in the region - 17,000 square miles of traditional land, the Menkragnoti area, next to Xingu National Park, was demarcated and legally titled to the Kayapo people by the Brazilian government in 1993. Since then the Rainforest Foundation UK, along with its sister organizations the Rainforest Foundation US, The Rainforest Foundation Norway, and the Rainforest Foundation Fund, have protected tens of millions of hectares of forest in 20 different rainforest countries around the globe. Together, the Rainforest Foundation family and its local partners is the largest global network of organisations dedicated to indigenous and community-led rainforest conservation.

== Approach ==
The Rainforest Foundation UK promotes a rights-based approach to rainforest protection. Its approach is founded on the belief that the best way to protect rainforest ecosystems is through empowering indigenous peoples and other forest dwellers to defend their fundamental rights to lands and resources. Its primary work in the Congo Basin promotes land and resource rights through community-led mapping as well as through legal and policy advocacy. It also promotes the role of local and indigenous communities in monitoring and protecting forests, and enhancing the detection and enforcement of forest crimes.

In order to pursue its mission, RFUK works in close cooperation with local organizations, indigenous groups and other traditional populations of the rainforest. It also seeks to "campaign to influence national and international laws to protect rainforests and their inhabitants".

The organisation has adopted an approach that emphasizes the strengthening of civil society and grassroots organisations as an important goal in the countries in which it is active. On this basis, it has prioritized building long-term partnerships with local and national organizations that share its key objectives.

== Current and past projects ==
The Rainforest Foundation UK is currently funding and collaborating on work in 8 countries: Cameroon, Central African Republic, Democratic Republic of Congo, Gabon, Ghana, Peru, Republic of Kenya. The Foundation's current programmes include:

=== Community Forests ===
RFUK's Community Forest programme aims to improve livelihoods while reducing deforestation and protecting biodiversity in the Congo Basin by establishing a successful and scalable model founded on the rights and priorities of local communities, including those of marginalised groups such as indigenous peoples and women.

=== MappingForRights ===
Mapping For Rights is a mapping and land-use planning initiative that enables communities to map their lands through low-cost, transferrable technologies and to use this data to advocate recognition of these areas and for wider policy reforms.

=== ForestLink ===
RFUK's community forest monitoring initiative allows users to monitor local forests, connecting them with law enforcement agencies to improve anti-deforestation measures. ForestLink is the system used by RFUK to send information about illegal deforestation to law enforcement.

=== Indigenous Land and Livelihoods ===
The Foundation's Indigenous Livelihoods programme in the Ene River valley region of the central Peruvian Amazon supports Asháninka families to generate sustainable incomes through the production of environmentally friendly cacao.

== Campaigns ==
=== Sustainable conservation and human rights ===
Rainforest Foundation UK has called upon national governments to review their current protected area policies, assessing their conservation effectiveness and revising practices so that community rights are integrated into all aspects of conservation and planning. The Foundation has also called upon international NGOs, aid agencies and conservation organizations to revise their conservation strategies with a more participatory and rights-based focus.

=== Climate Justice and REDD+ ===
The Foundation has been a major critic of carbon offsetting schemes such as REDD, citing issues such as a lack of effectiveness and negative impacts on forest-dependent communities.

=== Logging, extractive industries and infrastructure development ===
The Foundation has been a vocal supporter of a moratorium on new logging concessions in the Democratic Republic of the Congo, which has been in place since 2002. The organisation has campaigned alongside other environmental and human rights charities to preserve the moratorium. It has also researched and campaigned on direct and indirect threats posed by the extractive industries and associated infrastructure projects in the Congo Basin region

=== Agribusiness ===
RFUK has been critical of large-scale palm oil development in the Congo Basin, citing concerns over environmental damage and the displacement of local communities. In 2013, the charity, in collaboration with Ethical Consumer, produced a 'palm oil guide' for British consumers, which listed several brands available in the UK market with scores for each. The guide was discontinued in 2017.

== Funding ==
The Rainforest Foundation UK is a non-profit organization. The majority of its financing comes from foundation grants, development agencies (e.g. USAID, Norad, UKAID, AFD) and other non-profit organizations, the Rainforest Fund among them, as well as from individual donations.

According to its 2022 annual review, 95% of the Rainforest Foundation UK's expenditures go to charitable activities, with the remainder spent on governance costs, administration and fundraising.

== Collaboration ==
=== INGOs ===
The Rainforest Foundation UK has worked on joint projects and campaigns with several other international non-governmental organisations (INGOs), including:

- Client Earth
- Fern
- Forest Peoples Programme
- Greenpeace
- IIED
- Survival International
- Well Grounded
- TMG Think Tank

=== Local and indigenous partners ===
The Rainforest Foundation UK works in partnership with dozens of Indigenous organisations and human rights and environmental NGOs in Africa and South America, including:

==== Cameroon ====
- AJESH (Ajemalibu Self Help)
- APIFED (Appui à l’autopromotion et l’insertion des femmes, des jeunes et des désœuvrés)
- CED (Centre pour l’Environnement et le Développement)
- ECODEV
- FODER (Forêts et Développement Rural)

==== Central African Republic ====
- CAD

==== Democratic Republic of Congo ====
- APEM (Actions pour la Promotion et Protection des Peuples et Espèces Menacés)
- CAGDFT (Centre D’Appui à la Gestion Durable des Fôrets Tropicales)
- GASHE (Groupe d’action pour sauver l’homme et son environnement)
- GeoFirst
- PREPPYG
- Reseau Cref

==== Gabon ====
- Brainforest

==== Ghana ====
- Civic Response
- Friends of the Earth Ghana

==== Kenya ====
- Kenya Land Alliance

==== Peru ====
- AIDESEP (Asociación Interétnica de Desarrollo de la Selva Peruana)
- CARE (Central Ashaninka del Rio Ene)
- FENAMAD (Federación Nativa del Río Madre de Dios y Afluentes)

==== Republic of Congo ====
- CAD (Centre d’Actions pour le Développement)
- CJJ (Comptoir Juridique Junior)
- FGDH (Forum for the Governance of Human Rights)
- OCDH (Congolese Human Rights Observatory)

=== Corporate partnerships ===
The Rainforest Foundation UK does not participate in product certification schemes. However, it has previously partnered with companies and social enterprises for its fundraising. Current and past alliances include:

- Betty's and Taylor's Group Ltd
- Caffe Musetti
- Triodos Bank
- Ecotricity
- Loving Earth

== Publications ==
Rainforest Foundation UK produces a quarterly newsletter and publishes news updates on its website, as well as producing an annual report on its work. The organization also publishes reports, research and policy briefs on issues related to its work.
