= Jean-Pierre Dutilleux =

Belgian film director (born 1949)

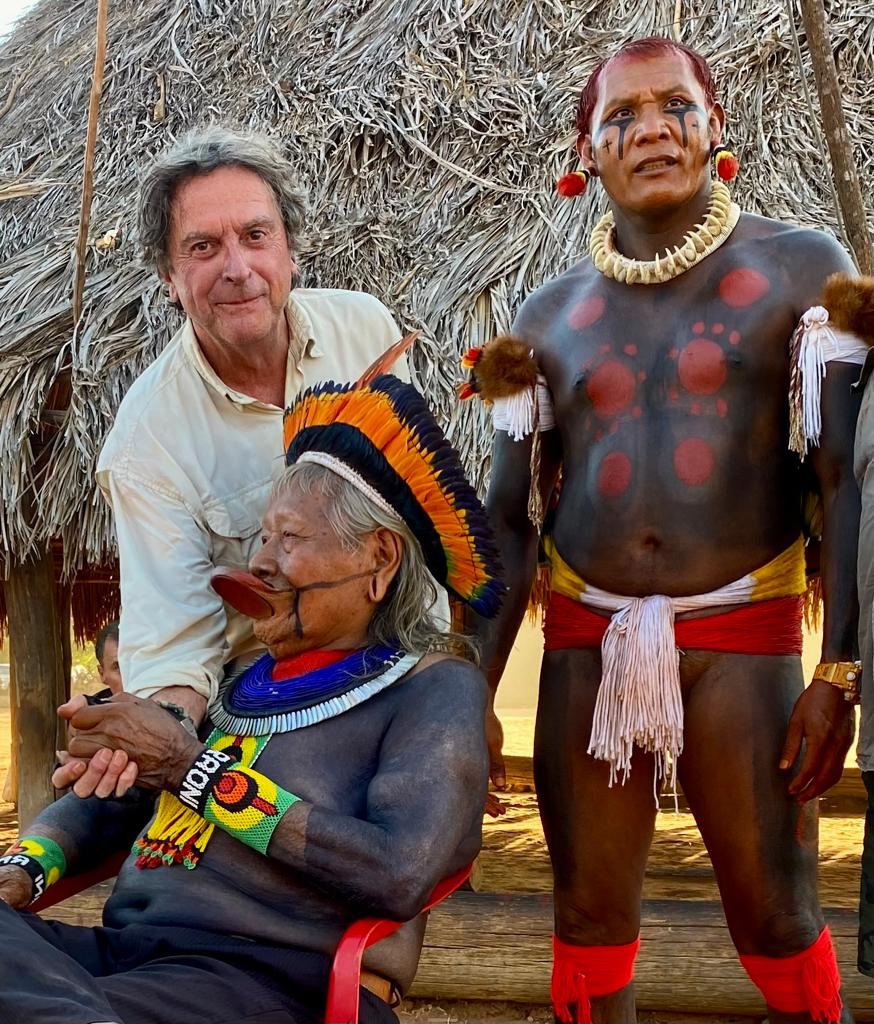
- Jean-Pierre Dutilleux (upper left), Raoni Yalawapiti, and Tapi Yalawapiti during Quarup, 2022
- Born: 13 October 1949 (age 76); Belgium
- Education: University of Louvain
- Occupations: Author; activist; filmmaker
- Notable work: Raoni (1978)

Jean-Pierre Dutilleux (born 13 October 1949) is a Belgian author, activist and filmmaker, known for his work documenting environmental issues and indigenous cultures, most notably in the Amazon rainforest.

== Career ==
Over the last forty years, Dutilleux has produced thirty films, including a dozen in the Amazon rainforest, taken thousands of photographs, and published six books.

He received an Academy Award nomination for his documentary Raoni, which examines issues surrounding the survival of indigenous Amazonian communities and the rainforest. Raoni investigates the complex issues surrounding the survival of the remaining indigenous natives of the Amazon rainforest and the rainforest itself.

A citizen of Belgium, Dutilleux earned a Bachelor of Arts degree in French and Literature from Saint Hadelin College in Liege and later studied law, languages, and economics at the University of Louvain. During his college years, Dutilleux traveled throughout North and South America and developed an interest in local tribes. In 1972, he served as an assistant to Costa-Gavras on the production State of Siege in Chile. Two years later, at the age of 23, Dutilleux completed his first film, a study of natives of the Amazon.

Since then, he has filmed and photographed over 50 tribes worldwide, produced multiple films in the Amazon, and undertaken various projects documenting indigenous communities. Additionally, his work as a photojournalist has appeared in more than 100 magazines in various countries.

During a visit to the Amazon, Dutilleux was accompanied by the musician Sting, who witnessed the indigenous tribes of the rapidly disappearing rainforest. Together, they wrote articles about the challenges faced by indigenous Amazonians. Dutilleux's photographs also raised awareness about rainforest conservation. Motivated by the response to these articles, Dutilleux and Sting co-founded The Rainforest Foundation with the stated mission to support the indigenous peoples’ efforts to preserve their way of life.

They launched an international campaign, including a television advertisement featuring Sting, directed by Dutilleux. In collaboration with Chief Raoni, they traveled internationally and established local foundations in 12 countries within 60 days to promote rainforest conservation. In his six latest books, Dutilleux recounts these adventures and shares his photographs.

== Controversies ==
Jean-Pierre Dutilleux has faced various controversies since the release of the documentary film Raoni (1978).

On 22 July 1981, the Brazilian daily Folha de S. Paulo reported that the FUNAI (National Indigenous Foundation, an Indigenous affairs agency in Brazil) created a new rule because of problems encountered with the movie Raoni. The article explained that while Raoni was the first commercial film in Brazil made with the participation of indigenous people, Dutilleux "did not respect the agreement signed with FUNAI to transfer 10% of the profits to the Indians Txucarramae, of the Xingu River region." The new criteria put in place by FUNAI: "The Indians who will take part in the shootings will have to be paid and notified to the Union of the Artists of Rio de Janeiro and the FUNAI."

According to Dutilleux, the allegations in this article are contradicted by a letter dated 7 May 1990, from Raoni's nephew Megaron Txuccaramae. He clarifies that the natives have received royalties from the Raoni film: "With this letter, we want to thank Jean-Pierre Dutilleux for his support to the Indians over the years. Since 1973, when we knew him, he is a great friend of the Indians. When he did the movie Raoni, in 1976, he was the first filmmaker to give the Indians royalties that we received directly from the Embrafilm distributor after he opened our first bank account." This letter, which was read to Raoni and approved by him in the presence of the counselor of the Belgian Embassy in Brasilia, was later published in Dutilleux's book L'Indien blanc.

In January 1990, a few months after having traveled the world with Chief Raoni and Sting, Jean-Pierre Dutilleux was profiled in an investigation by the French edition of the Rolling Stone Magazine. The author, Mark Zeller, said that Dutilleux was close to bankruptcy before meeting Sting and enriched himself during their charitable actions. According to Dutilleux, Mark Zeller's allegations are contradicted by Megaron Txuccaramae's letter of 7 May 1990, which indicates that Jean-Pierre Dutilleux was not paid for his charitable actions.

On 2 April 1990, Britain's ITV Network broadcast an episode of the investigative TV program World in Action, "Sting and the Indians", in which Jean-Pierre Dutilleux was denounced by Sting regarding the book Jungle Stories (published by JC Lattès), which they wrote and promoted together during their charity tour. Sting said he lobbied Dutilleux without success to return his generous advance on royalty rights to the rainforest foundation, created to help Brazilian indigenous peoples protect the Amazon rainforest. World in Action explained that Dutilleux kept the money and left the Rainforest Foundation after the episode. A note from the administrators of the Rainforest Foundation of 2 April 1990, made public by the Association Forêt Vierge in March 2017, states that he never received a cent from the Rainforest Foundation: "Jean-Pierre Dutilleux has received a lump sum for the repurchase of his photographs for the book Jungle Stories, in compensation of the costs of 16 years of travel, lodging, photographic expenses, repayments with rights holders, etc. He indicated his intention that all other royalties be returned to the Rainforest Foundation." In the same investigation, Dutilleux was accused by photographer Alexis de Vilar, co-founder of the charity Tribal Life Fund, for being at the origin of the disappearance of the receipts of a gala organized at the Chinese Theatre in Hollywood on 28 March 1979, to support the Raoni movie.

On 21 September 1991, the Belgian newspaper Le Soir released an article entitled "The Director of FUNAI denounces the Raoni-Dutilleux campaign", when Dutilleux had just launched a major fund-raising campaign from Belgium, which he claimed was with the consent of FUNAI. Sydney Possuelo, President-in-Office of FUNAI, declared: "Mr. Dutilleux is not and has never been authorized to raise funds on behalf of FUNAI, the Coordination of the Isolated Indians, or myself." On 7 October 1991, the Brazilian daily newspaper Folha de S. Paulo took over the affair in its title "A Belgian exploits Indians in the Amazon and tries a $ 5 million scam", saying that "the president of Funai, Sydney Possuelo, ended the scam, which promised individual donors and companies "rescue diplomas" of the Amazon." The article exposed that Jean-Pierre Dutilleux mentioned the embassy of Belgium as a supporter of his fundraising campaign and concluded on this point: "The Embassy asserts that its name was misquoted."

On 9 October 2000, Época dedicated an article to Jean-Pierre Dutilleux, whom she nicknamed "the Belgian sorcerer". The subtitle set the tone: "Who is Jean-Pierre Dutilleux, filmmaker who in three decades has earned fame and money by exploiting the image of Raoni and other Indians of Brazil?" For example, it claimed that Dutilleux was accused of selling photos of indigenous people online without proper authorization. Less than three weeks later, the daily Gazeta do Povo claimed that Jean-Pierre Dutilleux was banned by FUNAI from entering a reserve and specified that an investigation was opened against him "for sale of photos without payment of author rights". The mentioned judicial procedure also emanated from a request for investigation from Chief Raoni regarding the "fundraising carried out by Mr. Jean-Pierre Dutilleux outside Brazil, through abuse of the use of the name and the image of Chief Raoni", especially with the French government.

In 2012, it was stated in the Brazilian documentary film Belo Monte Announcement of a War (Belo Monte, Anúncio de uma Guerra), directed by André d'Elia, that the Association Forêt Vierge of Jean-Pierre Dutilleux held "hostage" Chief Raoni and his two companion indigenous people while they had come to campaign in Europe in September 2011 against the Belo Monte dam, to the construction of which French companies are associated. In a sequence, Raoni confirmed that Jean-Pierre Dutilleux "did not allow anyone to approach me" and showed a petition against Belo Monte, which Dutilleux and his team, he says, tried to prevent from being released. It is also alleged that the same team would have tried to exchange the silence of Chief Raoni on the misdeeds of the Belo Monte project against a promise that the borders of a territory of his people would be traced.

On 12 August 2016, Kayapo leaders Raoni Metuktire and Megaron Txucarramae announced through a press release published on the official website and Facebook page of the Instituto Raoni, that they completely cut any relationship with Jean-Pierre Dutilleux after several failures: "We recognize what Jean-Pierre Dutilleux has sometimes been able to bring to the level of the disclosure of our fight, but we have never appreciated his lack of respect, his opportunism and the way he exploited our image and the name of Cacique Raoni, to the point of damaging his reputation and jeopardizing his credibility." Jean-Pierre Dutilleux responded to these accusations via a video posted on YouTube and on the website of the Association Forêt Vierge.

On 7 August 2018, the French NGO Planète Amazone accused Jean-Pierre Dutilleux in a statement of having deliberately acted, "in Brazil and France", to destroy the confidence of his partners. They say he "did not hesitate to use the name of an incumbent head of state in an attempt to obtain statements of denunciation from indigenous leaders against Planète Amazone, claiming that it was this head of state himself who demanded, prior to offering his support." Online correspondence refers to Albert II, Prince of Monaco, as the mentioned head of state.

In one of his films dedicated to the Toulambi tribe of Papua New Guinea, Dutilleux states that his film footage documents one of the first encounters between the Toulambi tribe and outsiders. However, historical records suggest prior contact had already occurred. A video of this film has been extensively posted on the internet, prompting much discussion and questions about this claim. According to an article in the peer-reviewed Journal of Pacific History, the colonial archives indicate that the territory of the Toulambis was visited by at least six patrols between 1929 and 1972, which seems to debunk this claim.

Dutilleux has worked with thirty indigenous tribes, some of whom have limited contact with the outside world. He is working on a big-screen movie drama about an Amazonian tribe, which may include combining aspects of several tribes he knows to tell a typical history of Amazonian tribes.

== Filmography ==
- Raoni 1 award
- The Toulambi. First Contact in New Guinea (1998)

== Books ==
Books published by Dutilleux:

- Raoni, My Last Journey (2019)
- On the Trail of Lost Peoples (2015)
- Tribes: First World peoples (2013)
- Raoni: Memoirs of the Indian Chief (2010)
- Raoni and the First World (2000)
- The White Indian: 20 years of Amazonian Spell (1994)
- Raoni, an Indian Around the World in 60 days (1990)
- Jungle Stories, with Sting (1989)
