= Edwin Chota =

Peruvian environmental activist

- Chota in 2014
- Born: 1962
- Died: 1 September 2014 near Saweto, Peru
- Occupation: Environmental activist

Edwin Chota (1962 – 1 September 2014) was a Peruvian environmental activist and a leader of the Asháninka indigenous group and the president of the settlement of Saweto, Peru.

On 1 September 2014, Chota and three other community leaders, Jorge Ríos, Leoncio Quinticima, and Francisco Pinedo, were shot and killed by illegal loggers while they were protesting the illegal harvesting of mahogany within the boundaries of Saweto's land claim.

The 800-square-kilometre (310 sq mi) section of land claimed by Saweto is home to approximately 80 percent of the illegal logging in Peru. For 13 years, Chota had led the fight for the Peruvian government to recognize their land claims and end the illegal logging.

In response to the murder, the Interethnic Association for the Development of the Peruvian Rainforest (AIDESEP) claimed the police and the judiciary had done absolutely nothing to protect the men, despite repeated complaints and reports of death threats against them. AIDESEP also called on the Peruvian government to do more to protect indigenous people from criminal organizations.

On 30 January 2015, the regional government of Ucayali and the government of Peru granted the land title to the Saweto community confirming their ownership of the land. Finally, on April 11, 2024, four businessmen from the timber industry were sentenced to more than 28 years in prison by a Peruvian court for the murder of environmental activists. The verdict is not yet final.
