= Xingu-Rio HVDC transmission line =

HVDC transmission line in Brazil

Xingu-Rio
- Map of Xingu-Rio

Location
- Country: Brazil
- General direction: North-South
- From: Xingu substation, Anapu, Pará
- To: Terminal Rio substation, Paracambi, Rio de Janeiro

Construction information
- Commissioned: 22 August 2019

Technical information
- Type: overhead transmission line
- Current type: HVDC
- Total length: 2,543.4 km (1,580.4 mi)
- Capacity: 4000 MW
- DC voltage: 800 kV

The Xingu-Rio HVDC transmission line is a 2543.4 km long 800 kV high-voltage direct current transmission line in Brazil between the Xingu substation at the city of Anapu in the Pará state, 17 km from the Belo Monte Dam, and the Terminal Rio substation at the city of Paracambi in the Rio de Janeiro state. It was inaugurated 22 August 2019.

== See also ==
- Xingu-Estreito HVDC transmission line
