= Xingu-Estreito HVDC transmission line =

HVDC transmission line in Brazil

Xingu-Estreito
- Map of Xingu-Estreito

Location
- Country: Brazil
- General direction: North-South
- From: Xingu substation, Anapu, Pará
- To: Estreito substation, Ibiraci, Minas Gerais

Construction information
- Commissioned: 12 December 2017

Technical information
- Type: overhead transmission line
- Current type: UHVDC
- Total length: 2,076 km (1,290 mi)
- Capacity: 4000 MW
- DC voltage: 800 kV

The Xingu-Estreito UHVDC transmission line is a 2076 km long 800 kV high-voltage direct current transmission line in Brazil between the Xingu substation at the city of Anapu in the Pará state, 17 km from the Belo Monte Dam, and the Estreito substation at the city of Ibiraci in the Minas Gerais state. It was inaugurated 21 December 2017.

== See also ==
- Xingu-Rio HVDC transmission line
