= Rainforest Foundation Norway =

Norwegian non-governmental organization

- Founded: 1989
- Founder: The Norwegian Forum for the Environment and Development (ForUM); Friends of the Earth Norway; The Development Fund; The Future in Our Hands
- Type: Non-governmental organization
- Purpose: Human rights, Environmentalism
- Location: Oslo, Norway
- Region served: South America, Central Africa, Southeast Asia
- Method: Lobbying, research, field work
- Website: Rainforest.no

Rainforest Foundation Norway (RFN) is a non-governmental organization (NGO) working to protect the world's rainforests and to secure the legal rights of their inhabitants. It is one of the largest rainforest organizations in the world, and collaborates with over 50 local and national environmental, Indigenous and human rights organizations in 6 rainforest countries in the Amazon region, Central Africa and Southeast Asia. The organization works to support Indigenous peoples and local communities in securing their rights, prevent policy and business interests from contributing to the destruction of the rainforest; and to consolidate policies and practices that serve to protect it. RFN engages in advocacy work in key international processes concerning rainforest issues.

Rainforest Foundation Norway was founded in 1989, and is today one of Europe's leading organizations within the field of rainforest protection. It forms part of the Rainforest Foundation network, with independent sister organizations in the United States and the United Kingdom: the Rainforest Foundation US and the Rainforest Foundation UK.

RFN is a foundation, and its operations are funded by public authorities, as well as private donors, international funds and sponsors.

== History ==
Rainforest Foundation Norway was founded in 1989, following the formation of the Rainforest Foundation the same year by Sting and his wife Trudie Styler after the leader of the Indigenous Kayapo people of Brazil, Chief Raoni, made a personal request to them that they help his community protect its lands and culture. RFN at that time comprised the Norwegian branch of the international Rainforest Foundation network. In 1996, it became an independent foundation, with five Norwegian member organizations. From the organisation's inception, the executive director was Lars Løvold until March 2018, except from the years 2013-2014 when Dag Hareide was the executive director. From March 2018 to April 2021, Øyvind Eggen was the executive director. From April 2021, Tørris Jæger is the executive director.

== Approach to rainforest protection ==
Rainforest Foundation Norway espouses a rights-based approach to rainforest protection. Its approach is founded on the notion that the peoples who for generations have developed their cultures and societies in balanced interaction with the highly complex yet vulnerable ecosystems of the rainforest have fundamental rights to these areas. In order to attain its goal of implementing rights-based rainforest management in significant rainforest areas in all 6 countries where RFN and its partners are active, RFN supports programs and projects in cooperation with local organizations, Indigenous peoples, and traditional populations of the rainforest. It also seeks changes in the policies and practices of governments, intergovernmental bodies, and private enterprises; and to generate and strengthen national and international public awareness and action. In addition, the organization has adopted an approach that emphasizes the strengthening of civil society as an important goal in the countries in which it is active. On this basis, it has prioritized building long-term partnerships with local and national organizations that share its key objectives, as well as supporting the development of representative indigenous associations and community-based organizations.

== Programs ==
With its goal of preserving the rainforest, Rainforest Foundation Norway advocates for the rights of its Indigenous inhabitants, by providing project-related grants, capacity-building expertise and direct technical assistance to its local partners on the ground, including indigenous communities and grassroots organizations. In addition to working with these groups directly through program activities in local communities, RFN support them indirectly through policy, advocacy, and information activities aimed at securing rights, establishing indigenous territories and protecting the rainforest.

== See also ==
- The Rainforest Foundation Fund
- The Rainforest Foundation US
- Environmental problems caused by deforestation
- Environmental law
- Reducing Emissions from Deforestation and Forest Degradation
- Self-determination
- Traditional Ecological Knowledge
- Sustainable development
- Indigenous land rights
- Indigenous peoples of the tropical rainforest
- Deforestation of the Amazon Rainforest
- Environmental Movement
