= Death of a Shadow =

2012 short film

- Film poster
- Directed by: Tom Van Avermaet
- Written by: Tom Van Avermaet
- Produced by: Ellen De Waele
- Starring: Matthias Schoenaerts
- Cinematography: Stijn Van Der Veken
- Edited by: Dieter Diependaele
- Music by: Raf Keunen
- Distributed by: ShortsHD
- Release dates: 4 June 2012 (France); 9 October 2012 (Belgium)
- Running time: 20 minutes
- Country: Belgium
- Language: Dutch

Death of a Shadow (Dutch: Dood van een Schaduw) is a 2012 Belgian fantasy short film written and directed by Tom Van Avermaet, starring Matthias Schoenaerts. On 10 January 2013, it was nominated for the 2012 Academy Award for Best Live Action Short Film.

After being nominated for an Oscar, the film was released along with all the other 15 Oscar-nominated short films in theaters by ShortsHD.

== Synopsis ==
The shadow of Nathan Rijckx, a Belgian soldier who died in World War I, is captured by a collector. He is offered the chance to live again if he captures the shadows of 10,000 other people instead. He thinks nothing of his job at first. Simply find the name, pick the death, and capture the shadow when they die. Between his job, he touches the nails in his own shadow to remember what it was like right when he died. He remembers the woman Sarah Winters, who helped him right before his death, and how he was in love with her, and his mission is given new purpose.

When he is called to capture the shadow of Thomas Belcourt, he sees that Sarah is in love with another soldier by the name of Daniel Hainaut. He grows furious with jealousy and sees that he only has to capture one more shadow before he can finally be relieved. As part of his job, Nathan can pick who he wants to capture the shadow of. He goes through every Daniel Hainaut until he finds the right one, who was shot to death by a firing squad in 1917. Nathan does his job and is allowed to live again. He can pick any time period he wants after his death, but after the first hour of life the doors to the collection will be forever closed to him.

Nathan goes to the time right after Daniel's death and feels as if he is going to spend the rest of his new life with Sarah again. She sees his uniform and assumes that it is Daniel. When Nathan turns around, she doesn't recognize him and becomes distraught. Her maid apologizes to Nathan, explaining the situation and saying that dead soldiers don't come back to life.

Just before the doors to the shadow collection close, Nathan slips back in and pulls the nails out of Daniel's shadow to allow him to live again. The rule is one shadow for another, and so Nathan is killed in Daniel's place. When Sarah finally dies of old age, her shadow is put next to Nathan's.

== Principal cast ==
- Matthias Schoenaerts as Nathan Rijckx
- Laura Verlinden as Sarah Winters
- Peter Van Den Eede as the shadow collector
- Benjamin Ramon as Daniel Hainaut

== Reception ==
In 2012, the film screened at 11 festivals in 6 countries, winning three awards, before being nominated for an Academy Award at the beginning of 2013. It premiered at the Le Court En Dit Long festival in Paris, France, on June 4, 2012.

On September 16, 2012, the LA Shorts Fest in Los Angeles awarded it the Best Of The Fest award, which made the film an Oscar Qualifier. In October it won the International Competition - Winner: Best European Short/EFA Award at the 57th Seminci - Valladolid International Film Festival (Spain), which also means that the film is nominated for the European Film Awards of 2013. The same month, at the 3rd Fantastique semaine du cinéma (Nice, France), it won the Audience Award.

== See also ==
- Cinema of Belgium
- List of Belgian Academy Award winners and nominees
