= Prince's Rainforests Project =

The Prince's Rainforests Project
- Founded: 2007
- Founder: Charles III
- Purpose: Environmentalism, Conservation
- Website: www.princeofwales.gov.uk/the-prince-of-wales/initiatives/princes-rainforests-project/

The Prince's Rainforests Project (PRP) was set up in the UK in 2007 by King Charles III the then Prince of Wales following reports from leading climate change experts, including the Intergovernmental Panel on Climate Change, to promote awareness of the urgent need to take action against tropical deforestation. The Prince of Wales has long been concerned about climate change and about how destruction of the world's rainforests contributes to rising temperatures and sea levels.

The project is working with governments, businesses and non-profit organisations around the world to quickly find solutions to deforestation, with the ambition of "making the trees worth more alive than dead".

If deforestation can be stopped in its tracks, then we will be able to buy ourselves some much-needed time to build the low carbon economies on which our futures depend. I have endeavoured to create a global public, private and NGO partnership to discover an innovative means of halting tropical deforestation. Success would literally transform the situation for our children and grandchildren and for every species on the planet.

— Prince of Wales

On 5 May 2009, The Prince's Rainforests Project launched a global awareness campaign to improve understanding of the link between rainforests and climate change and the need for urgent action to stop deforestation in the run up to the climate change conference in Copenhagen in December 2009. A number of celebrities worked with the PRP to promote the campaign.

The Prince's Rainforest Project is now a part of the International Sustainability Unit, which was also created by the Prince in relation to international deforestation.

== See also ==
- Biodiversity
- Indigenous peoples
- Related charities such as Rainforest Foundation Fund and the Rainforest Action Network
- United Nations Environment Programme
