= Saweto, Peru =

Saweto Alta Tamaya-Saweto
- Indigenous Area
- Location within Peru
- Coordinates: 8.983071°S 73.170511°W
- Country: Peru
- Region: Ucayali
- Province: Coronel Portillo
- Titled: 2015
- Recognized as native: 2003

Area
  - Total: 786 km^{2} (303 sq mi)
- Time zone: UTC-5 (PET)

Saweto, also spelled Soweto, is a small village of mostly Asháninka people in Peru. Located within the Ucayali region, the village lies deep in the Peruvian Amazon, on the Alto Tamaya river, near the Brazilian border. The people of Saweto have engaged in a continuous struggle for official title from the Peruvian government to the land they inhabit. This would help enforce against illegal activities, like logging, and encroachment. The village and its struggle gained widespread national and international media coverage following the murder of Saweto's leader, Edwin Chota, and three others, in September 2014, by illegal loggers as they crossed the Brazilian border to meet with leaders of another – though related – indigenous community. With increased pressure from the media following these assassinations, the Peruvian government granted legal title to the people of Saweto on January 30, 2015. This land title grants the Asháninka people of Saweto 80,000 hectares, despite strong opposition from pro-logging lobbies, and illegal loggers.

== See also ==
- Scott Wallace (photojournalist)
- Illegal logging
- Mahogany
- Indigenous peoples
- Indigenous and community conserved area
- Rainforest Foundation US
