= Rainforest Foundation US =

Non-profit organization based in the U.S.

- Formation: 1988; 38 years ago
- Type: Non-governmental organization
- Tax ID no.: 95-1622945
- Purpose: Human rights, environmentalism
- Headquarters: Brooklyn, New York
- Region served: Central and South America
- Method: Advocacy, research, field work
- Key people: Trudie Styler and Sting, founders Suzanne Pelletier, Executive Director; John W. Copeland, Chair of the Board of Directors
- Website: rainforestfoundation.org

Rainforest Foundation US is a US-based non-profit organization that partners with Indigenous peoples in Central and South America to protect rainforest ecosystems. The organizations employs a rights-based approach to environmental protection, supporting indigenous peoples in their efforts to secure their lands, protect their environment and uphold their rights.

Rainforest Foundation US focuses its work on three main areas: land rights, rainforest protection and strengthening Indigenous peoples and local community organizations.

The idea that the indigenous peoples of the world are holders of a specific set of rights and are also the victims of historically unique forms of discrimination is most completely/thoroughly enunciated by the United Nations Declaration on the Rights of Indigenous Peoples, adopted by the UN General Assembly in 2007.

== History ==
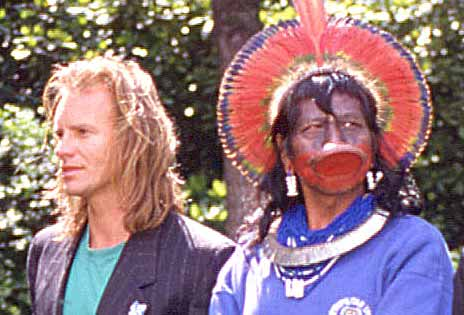
Sting and the Chief Raoni in 1989 in Paris

The Rainforest Foundation was founded in 1988 by Sting and his wife Trudie Styler after the indigenous leader of the Kayapo people of Brazil, the Chief Raoni made a personal request to them to help his community protect their lands and culture. The Rainforest Foundation's initial project was successful in coordinating the first ever privately funded demarcation of indigenous land in the region – 17,000 square miles of traditional land, the Menkragnoti area, next to Xingu National Park, was demarcated and legally titled to the Kayapo people by the Brazilian government in 1993.

Since then Rainforest Foundation US, along with its sister organizations Rainforest Foundation UK, Rainforest Foundation Norway, and the Rainforest Foundation Fund, have protected a total of 28 million acres of forest in 20 different rainforest countries around the globe.

== Priorities and approach to rainforest protection ==
To protect rainforests, Rainforest Foundation US advocates for the rights of its indigenous inhabitants, by providing project-related grants, capacity-building expertise and direct technical assistance to partners on the ground, including indigenous and local communities, and grassroots organizations.

According to its website, Rainforest Foundation US's current work is focused around three main priorities:

=== Land rights ===
Rainforest Foundation US believes that indigenous peoples can defend their communities, and their rainforests, against extractive pressures if they have secure rights to their lands and natural resources. They are not alone in this belief - it is widely accepted that indigenous communities are effective stewards of the environment. Securing indigenous land rights is particularly crucial to conserving the rainforest as many of the world's remaining intact rainforests are found in traditional indigenous lands.

However, indigenous peoples are often not recognized as the owners of their land, even if they have lived there for hundreds or thousands of years. Without official recognition, many indigenous communities have little recourse but to watch as government or corporate interventions profit from and even damage or destroy huge tracts of their forests without their consent.

Moreover, indigenous groups face significant legal, technical and cultural barriers to obtaining legal recognition of their land rights, including: inadequate national legislation, difficulties with accurate marking of boundaries, lack of good maps and documentation, historic discrimination, unfamiliarity with legal systems, and geographic isolation. Rainforest Foundation US works with indigenous communities to overcome these hurdles.

=== Protecting rainforests ===
Deforestation is among the greatest threats facing our planet, contributing to biodiversity loss and climate change through the release of CO₂ from forest clearance and degradation. At present, only about one-third of the world's original tropical forests remain standing; the other two-thirds have been degraded or lost to human-driven deforestation.

Tropical rainforests, such as the Amazon, are some of the world's largest carbon sinks, absorbing and storing vast amounts of carbon dioxide. Their protection is considered critical to mitigating climate change and preserving life on earth.

Indigenous peoples and local communities have long been at the frontline of resistance against deforestation, protecting approximately 36% of the world's remaining intact tropical forests.

Rainforest Foundation US partners with these communities by providing tools, training, and support to strengthen community-based forest governance and territorial defense. It was among the first environmental organizations to incorporate technologies such as satellite imagery, GPS-enabled phones, and drones into community-led monitoring efforts.

==== Rainforest Alert Program ====
In 2021, a study published in the Proceedings of the National Academy of Sciences evaluated Rainforest Alert, a technology-based forest monitoring system co-developed by Rainforest Foundation US and the Organización Regional de los Pueblos Indígenas del Oriente (ORPIO). The study found that participating communities in the Peruvian Amazon experienced a 52% reduction in deforestation during the program's first year.

Since then, Rainforest Foundation US has expanded Rainforest Alert to additional regions, establishing community-led satellite information centers and data hubs aimed at building a network for rainforest monitoring.

=== Strengthening local organizations ===
Indigenous communities in the rainforest face frequent threats to their homes and livelihoods from land invasions, illegal resource extraction, and the undermining of their rights at the local and national levels. Indigenous peoples are often not respected, nor even recognized, as rights holders, and traditional indigenous governance practices and structures are not respected by local and national authorities or by outsiders interested in exploiting the resources of the rainforest.

Rainforest Foundation US funds and collaborates on various capacity-building initiatives of indigenous leadership and indigenous organizations. They provide technical support, legal guidance, and funding for community training workshops. These workshops train local leaders in building administratively and financially strong organizations that are capable of effectively managing social and economic development projects on their lands as well defending their rights. Rainforest Foundation US also assists communities with formalizing their traditional governance practices to ensure that they are acknowledged and respected by local and national authorities.

== Notable initiatives ==
=== Brazil ===
==== Advocacy in Raposa Serra do Sol ====
Raposa Serra do Sol, in the northern Brazilian Amazon, is inhabited by Macuxi, Wapichana, Ingarikó, Taurepang, and Patamona peoples who sought legal recognition of their traditional lands for more than three decades. Their efforts faced opposition from cattle ranchers, rice producers, and others with economic interests in the area, some of whom were reported to use violence or intimidation against Indigenous peoples to continue illegal activities. In 2004, the Indigenous Council of Roraima (CIR), together with Rainforest Foundation US, brought the situation to the Inter-American Commission on Human Rights, which issued precautionary measures urging the Brazilian government to protect the life and physical integrity of the Ingarikó, Macuxi, Patamona, Taurepang, and Wapichana peoples of Raposa Serra do Sol. In 2005, the Brazilian government formally recognized the territory and ordered the removal of illegal settlers, marking a major turning point in one of the country’s most high-profile land rights disputes.

=== Peru ===
==== Deforestation monitoring ====
In 2018, researchers from New York University and Johns Hopkins University, in collaboration with Rainforest Foundation US and the Indigenous Peoples’ Organization of the Eastern Amazon (ORPIO), conducted a study on the effectiveness of satellite-based early-warning systems for indigenous forest monitoring in the Peruvian Amazon. More than 70 Shipibo communities participated, with half receiving training to use smartphone mapping tools that incorporated real-time deforestation alerts. According to the study, communities using the technology experienced reduced rates of deforestation—52% in the first year of the intervention and 21% in the second—compared with control communities. The results were published in the Proceedings of the National Academy of Sciences (PNAS).

==== 2014 quadruple homicide ====
The Ashéninka community of Alto Tamaya–Saweto in the Peruvian Amazon sought legal recognition of its territory near the border with Brazil for more than a decade. In 2014, four community leaders who were advocating for land recognition were murdered, drawing national and international attention to the case.

After the murders, Rainforest Foundation US supported Saweto by assisting with documentation and engaging with government agencies during the land titling process. In 2015, the Peruvian government granted the community legal title to more than 200,000 acres of land. The organization has also supported the community in its demands for a full investigation of the murders of its leaders. In 2023, a Peruvian court convicted four individuals for the 2014 killings.

==== Land titling campaigns ====
Since 2022, Rainforest Foundation US has collaborated with the Interethnic Association for the Development of the Peruvian Amazon (AIDESEP) to implement a grassroots strategy to support indigenous communities seeking legal recognition of their territories. Multiple communities have advanced steps in the land titling process, including territorial demarcation, obtaining official legal titles, or expanding the recognized land boundaries.

In 2025, Rainforest Foundation US announced an agreement with Rainforest Trust to receive financial and technical support for a two-year initiative aimed at expanding land titling efforts to more than 40 additional communities in the Chambira–Marañón region of Peru.

=== Central America ===
==== Collective Land Rights in the Darién Gap (Panama) ====
Since 2010, Rainforest Foundation US has worked with organizations representing the Guna, Emberá, Wounaan, and other peoples in the Darién to map Indigenous collective lands located outside of the Comarcas (recognized Indigenous territories in Panama) and to strengthen territorial defense in response to ongoing colonization and land tenure disputes. RFUS has also supported community cartographers and forest monitors through training in traditional mapping techniques and digital data collection, including the use of drones and mobile tools. Research on community-based forest governance in Panama has documented the role of these initiatives, including work with the Wounaan community of Aruza.

==== Recognition of the Naso Tjër Di Comarca (Panama) ====
In the mid-2010s, Rainforest Foundation US began working with the Naso people (one of only two Indigenous peoples in Panama with no legal rights to their ancestral lands) by supporting territorial mapping and monitoring efforts, strengthening leadership communication and advocacy skills, and coordinating with international partners such as the Land Rights Now coalition and Oxfam.

In 2020, after decades of efforts by the Naso people to obtain legal recognition of their territory, Panama’s Supreme Court of Justice granted them title to approximately 160,000 hectares of ancestral land, formally establishing the Naso Tjër Di Comarca.

==== Facilitating Access to Climate Funds (Central America and Mexico) ====
To address ongoing inequities in climate finance, Rainforest Foundation US contributed to the early development of the Mesoamerican Territorial Fund, a regional financing mechanism created by the Mesoamerican Alliance of Peoples and Forests (AMPB). The fund is designed to channel resources directly to Indigenous and local communities across Mexico and Central America.

== Funding ==
Rainforest Foundation US is a 501(c)(3) non-profit organization. In 2024, around half of its funding came from grants from foundations and other non-profit organizations. Its second major source of funding was individual donations. The organization emphasises that a significant portion of funds goes directly into programs supporting indigenous partners.

== Criticism ==
Since 2008, Rainforest Foundation US has received four stars out of four from Charity Navigator, with an efficiency score of 38.93 out of 40. However, from 2002 to 2004 the organization was given zero stars, primarily because only 43–60% of funds during those years were spent on programs on the ground.

== See also ==
- Reducing emissions from deforestation and forest degradation
- Self-determination
- Traditional ecological knowledge
- Sustainable development
- Indigenous land rights
- Indigenous peoples of the Americas
- Amazon rainforest
- Deforestation of the Amazon Rainforest
- Deforestation in Brazil
- Conservation movement
