= Anapu =

Municipality in Pará, Brazil

- Municipality
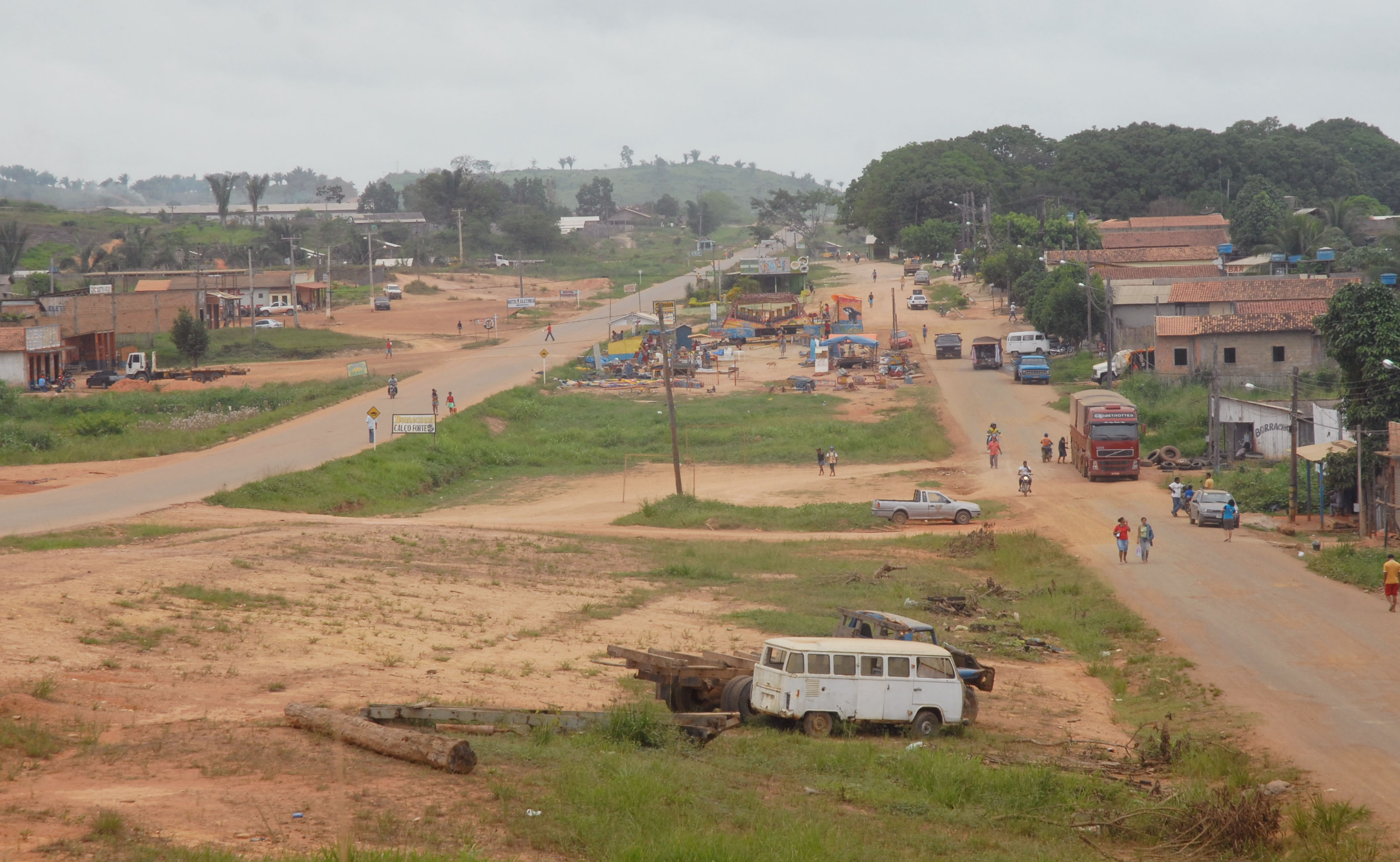
- View of Anapu

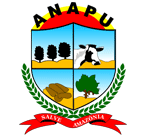
- Flag Coat of arms

- Location in Pará state

- Location in Brazil
- Coordinates: 03°28′20″S 51°11′52″W
- Country: Brazil
- Region: North
- State: Pará

Area
  - Total: 11,895 km^{2} (4,593 sq mi)

Population (2020)
  - Total: 28,607
  - Density: 2.4050/km^{2} (6.2288/sq mi)
- Time zone: UTC−3 (BRT)

Anapu is a city in Pará, Brazil. Its population in 2020 was 28,607 inhabitants. The territorial area of Anapu is 11,895 km^{2}.

Anapu's rain forests are subject to massive clearcutting.

Anapu attracted international attention on February 12, 2005, when the American-born, naturalized Brazilian citizen Sister Dorothy Stang—member of the Sisters of Notre Dame de Namur, and advocate for the rural poor of the Amazon rainforest—was murdered there.
