= Raoni =

1978 film

- Film poster
- Directed by: Jean-Pierre Dutilleux; Luiz Carlos Saldanha
- Written by: Jean-Pierre Dutilleux; Luiz Carlos Saldanha; Barry Hugh Williams
- Produced by: Jean-Pierre Dutilleux; Michel Gast; Luiz Carlos Saldanha
- Narrated by: Marlon Brando (English version); Paulo César Peréio (Portuguese version); Jacques Perrin (French version)
- Cinematography: Luiz Carlos Saldanha
- Edited by: Vera Freire
- Release date: 1978
- Running time: 84 minutes
- Countries: France; Belgium
- Language: English

Raoni (also known as Raoni: The Fight for the Amazon) is a 1978 French-Belgian documentary film directed by Jean-Pierre Dutilleux and Luiz Carlos Saldanha on the life of Raoni Metuktire. The film portrays issues surrounding the survival of the indigenous tribes of north central Brazil. It was nominated for an Academy Award for Best Documentary Feature.

== Cast ==
Besides its titular subject, Raoni, the film featured Marlon Brando, Clive Kelly, Jacques Perrin, Paulo César Pereio, and Cláudio Villas Boas.

== See also ==
- Raoni Metuktire
- Marlon Brando filmography
