= Raoni Metuktire =

Indigenous Brazilian leader and environmentalist (born 1932)

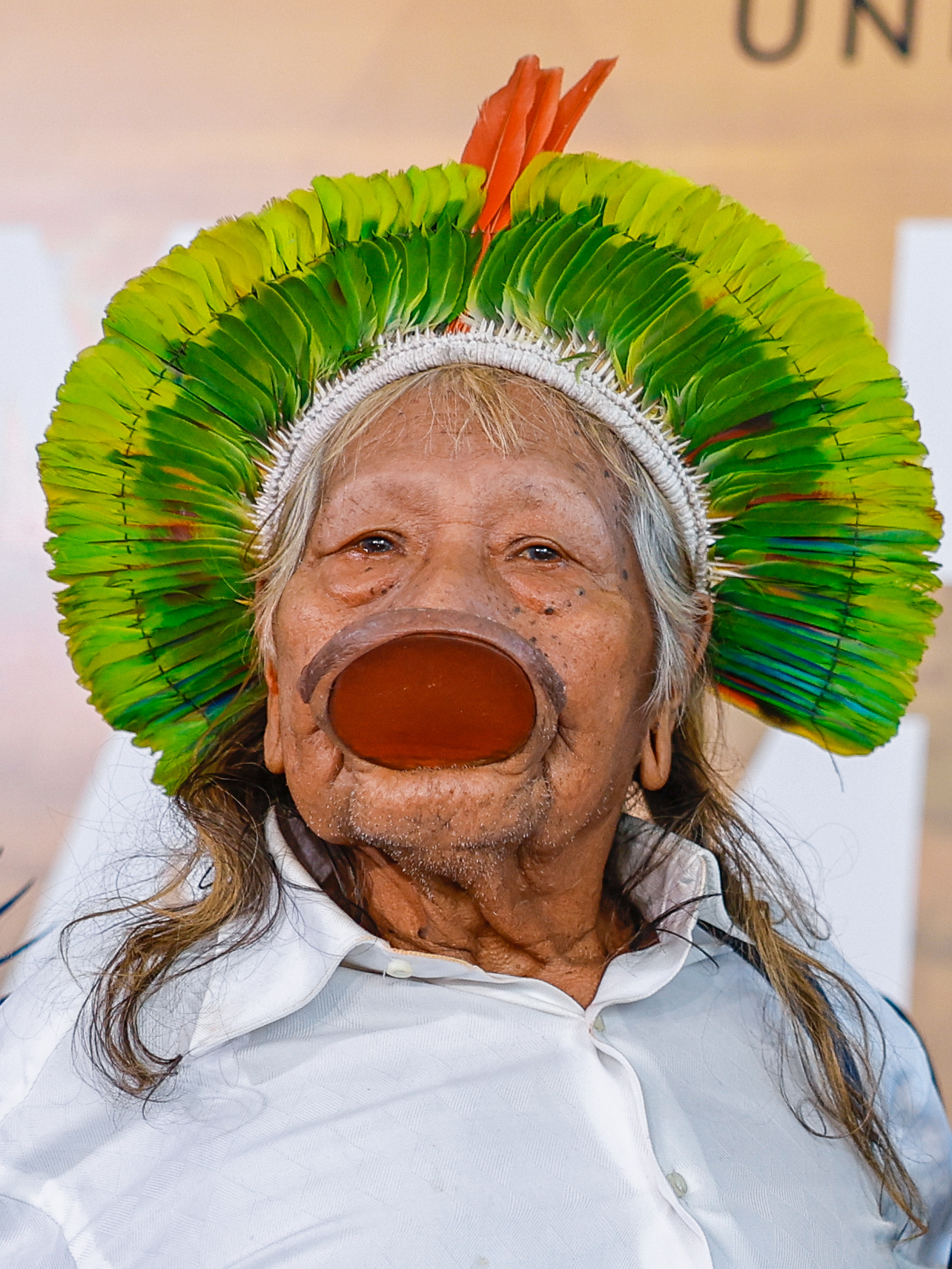
- Raoni in 2023

Metuktire, Kayapo people leader

Personal details
- Born: 1932 (age 93–94) Kapot Indigenous Territory, Mato Grosso, Brazil
- Known for: Resistance to the Amazon Rainforest industrialization and deforestation
- Nickname: Raoni

Raoni Metuktire (born 1932), also known as Chief Raoni or Ropni, is an Indigenous Brazilian leader and environmentalist. He is a chief of the Kayapo people, a Brazilian Indigenous group from the plain lands of the Mato Grosso and Pará in Brazil, south of the Amazon River and along Xingu River and its tributaries. He is internationally famous as a living symbol of the fight for the preservation of the Amazon rainforest and indigenous culture.

== Early campaigns ==
Cacique (a Native American word for chieftain) Raoni Metuktire was born in the state of Mato Grosso in 1932, in the heart of the Brazilian part of the Amazon rainforest, in a village called Krajmopyjakare (today called Kapôt in the Brazilian municipality of Peixoto de Azevedo). Born in the Metuktire family of Kayapo people, he is one of Cacique Umoro's sons. As the Kayapo tribe is nomadic, his childhood was marked by continuous travel, during which he witnessed many tribal wars. Guided by his brother Motibau, in 1947, at the age of 15, he chose to have a painted wooden lip plate (called botoque by the warriors of his tribe) placed under his lower lip.

Raoni and other members of the Metuktire tribe encountered the outside world for the first time in 1954. He was 22 years old at the time. Young Raoni wore trousers for the first time and was initiated into the Portuguese language by Orlando Villas-Bôas, the eldest of the Villas-Bôas brothers and a famous indigenous anthropologist in Brazil, the young Raoni was ready for Kuben's invasion (Kuben meaning "the others" or "white people").

In 1964, he met the former king Leopold III of Belgium while the latter was on an expedition into indigenous reservations in Mato Grosso.

Deforestation was already a cause for concern when Raoni, a documentary film by Jean-Pierre Dutilleux and narrated by Jacques Perrin, was shot. Marlon Brando, known for his support of Native American people, had just been paid an unprecedented $3.7 million for his 10-minute part in Superman, but agreed to appear for no salary in Raoni's opening sequence.

Brazilian media's sudden interest made Raoni the banner-bearer of the fight for the preservation of the Amazon rainforest, which had been jeopardized by illegal deforestation, the increasing cultivation of soya beans, and the use of hydroelectric dams for the generation of electricity.

== 1989 international campaign ==
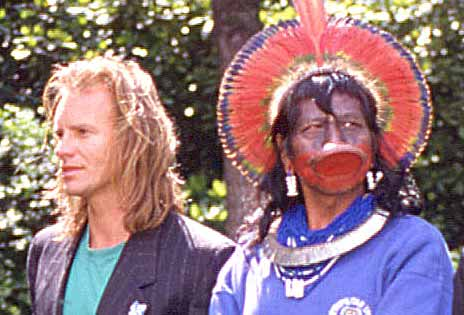
Raoni with Sting in 1989 in Paris

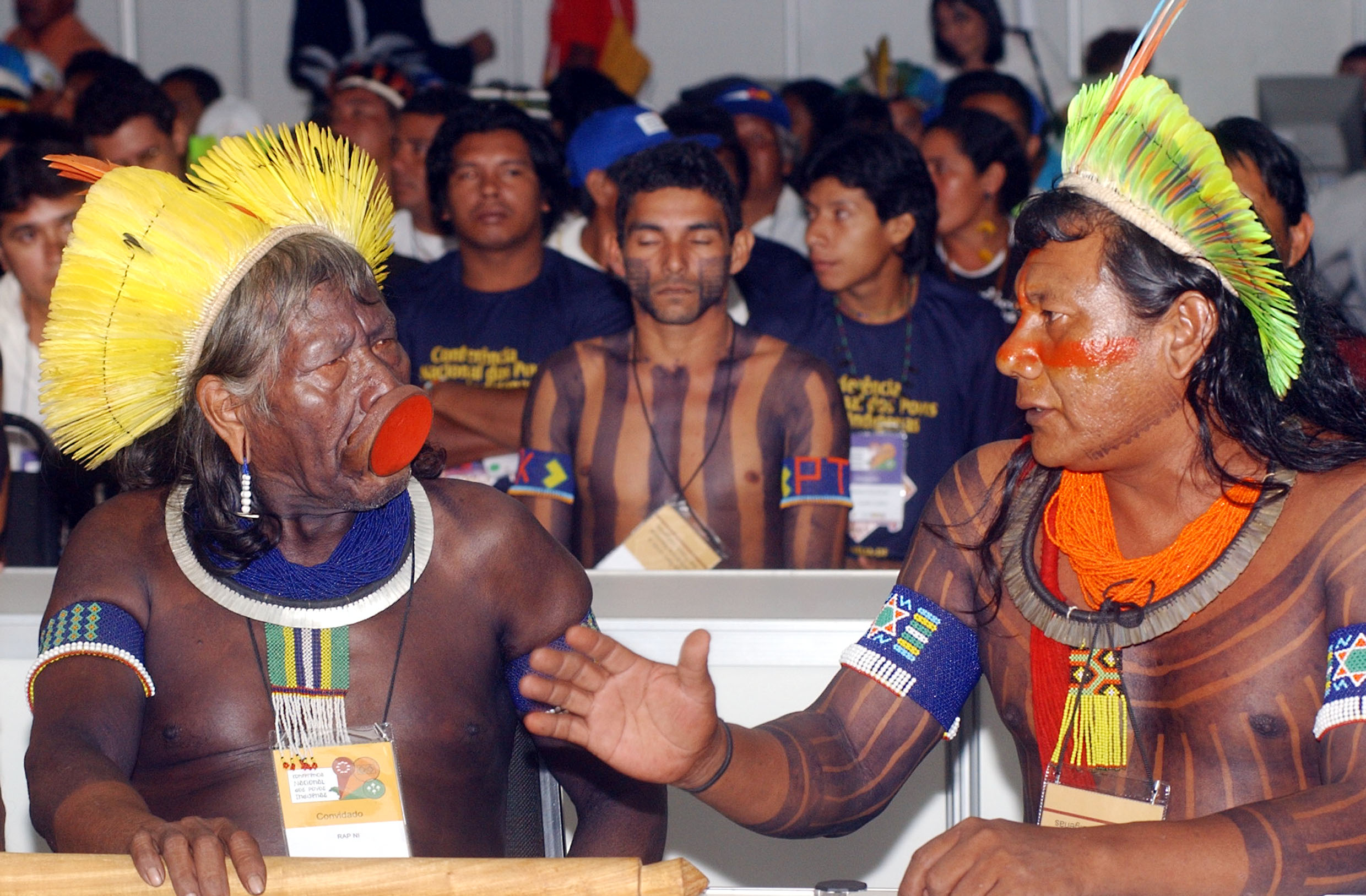
Raoni in a conference in Brazil in April 2006

Raoni gained international attention thanks to musician Sting, who came to meet him in the Xingu in November 1987. On 12 October 1988, Sting participated with Raoni in a press conference prior to the São Paulo show of the "Human Rights Now!" Amnesty International tour. After this event, Sting, his wife Trudie Styler, and Jean-Pierre Dutilleux founded the Rainforest Foundation. Its initial purpose was to support Raoni's projects, the first being the demarcation of Kayapos territory threatened by invasion.

In February 1989, Raoni became one of the fiercest opponents to the Belo Monte Dam project. Television broadcasts transmitted his opinions in Altamira during a large assembly of chiefs.

Raoni visited 17 countries with Sting from April to June 1989. The very successful campaign gave him the opportunity to raise awareness around the world about deforestation. Twelve rainforest foundations were created to raise funds for the establishment of a huge national park in the Rio Xingu River region, in Pará and Mato Grosso Brazilian states. Raoni's dream was to unite the five demarcated indigenous territories (Baú, Kaiapó, Panará, Kapôt Jarina, Bàdjumkôre) with the undemarcated Mekragnotire lands. Along with the adjoining Xingu National Park, the united indigenous lands would cover approximately 180,000 km^{2} (nearly one-third the area of France).

In 1993, funds raised worldwide helped to make Raoni's dream a reality. The Xingu indigenous lands were reunited, creating one of the world's most important rainforest reserves.

== International Ambassador for the preservation of the forest and Amazonian people's culture ==
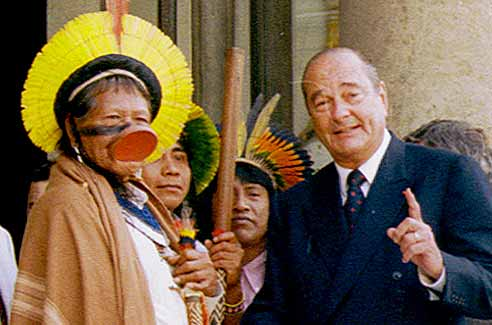
Raoni and French President Jacques Chirac in May 2000 at The Élysée Palace.

French President Jacques Chirac declared Raoni a living symbol of the fight for the protection of the environment. Since 1989, the Kayapo leader has traveled to many places in the world, including the northeastern parts of Québec, Canada, to visit the Innu people in August 2001, and to Japan in May 2007. His messages were particularly well received in European countries such as France, which he visited in 2000, 2001 and 2003.

Isolated from the rest of the world until the twentieth century, the indigenous peoples of the Xingu region have fought to orally preserve their traditions for countless generations. Raoni found ways to connect these cultures with the world, while keeping appropriate stoicism, distance and dignity. Although he meets with prominent people in many countries, he lives in a simple hut and owns nothing. The gifts he receives are always redistributed.

During his media appearances, he is almost always seen wearing a wreath of yellow feathers and arrayed with Kayapo earrings and necklaces. He is easily recognizable with his lip plate that stretches his lower lip. Subsequent generations have not kept this tradition; Raoni is one of the last men to wear a lower lip plate.

In September 2011, Chief Raoni was made an honorary citizen of Paris by Paris mayor Bertrand Delanoë, and received the medal of the French National Assembly from Nicolas Perruchot of France's National Assembly. In 2019, a group of environmentalists and anthropologists put his name forward as a candidate for the 2020 Nobel Peace Prize for his lifetime defense of the forest.

In a September 2021 interview with the magazine Paris Match, Raoni expressed interest in continuing his advocacy, even at his advanced age: "All those people, with the help of the current government, have already planned to deforest it all. I will not let them do it. [...] So, I will continue the fight and we must work with our friends to set up a new campaign."

== Opposition to Belo Monte Dam ==
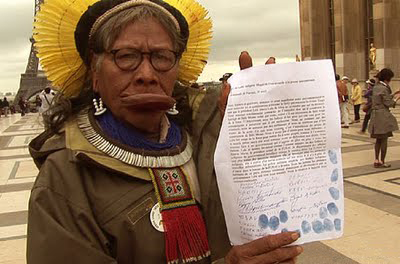
Raoni holding his international petition against the Belo Monte Dam in Paris.

In an interview on French TV channel TF1, during Raoni's 2010 European campaign to France, Belgium, Switzerland, Monaco and Luxembourg, he declared war on the Belo Monte Dam project, which jeopardized indigenous territories on the bank of the Xingú river in the state of Pará (Brazil). He also reaffirmed his determination to protect the Amazon rainforest from a major disaster: "I asked my warriors to be ready for the war. I told the tribes of the High Xingú the same. We will not be pushed around."

During the tour, he visited France, where he promoted his memoirs Raoni, mémoires d'un chef indien He was welcomed by former French president Jacques Chirac and endorsed Fondation Chirac, whose purpose was to preserve the cultures of indigenous people and the rainforest's biodiversity, including the creation of an institute in the middle of the Brazilian Amazon rainforest.

During the tour, he was also welcomed by Albert II, Prince of Monaco, known as an advocate for the protection of nature. The former French president Nicolas Sarkozy declined to welcome Raoni during the tour, even though he invited Raoni to France in September 2009 during an official visit to Brazil.

The Brazilian Institute of Environment and Renewable Natural Resources (IBAMA), the last defence against the construction of the Belo Monte dam, delivered the licence to the consortium of Brazilian companies Norte Energia on 1 June 2011. This information has been forwarded by the media and social networks all over the world with a picture of Raoni crying. The caption added that his tears were provoked by the announcement of the final validation of the project. Indignant, Chief Raoni denied on his official website:

I didn't cry because of the authorisation of the construction of the Belo Monte dam and the beginning of the construction [...] President Dilma will cry, but I will not. I want to know who gave this picture and spread this false information [...] President Dilma will have to kill me in front of the Planalto Palace (Palácio do Planalto). Then you will be able to build the Belo Monte dam.

According to Amazon Watch, his crying had nothing to do with the dam or any news related to it; it is a custom among the Kayapo to cry when they greet an old acquaintance or relative that they have not seen for a long time, as was happening when this photo was taken.

In September 2011, Chief Raoni went to the United Nations Human Rights Council in Geneva and participated in Rio+20 in June 2012. Raoni is not disheartened. He recently received the support of famous people such as James Cameron, Sigourney Weaver, Arnold Schwarzenegger, Vincent Cassel, Marion Cotillard, Edgar Morin, Jan Kounen, Nicolas Hulot, Danielle Mitterrand, Mino Cinelu and launched an international petition in 7 languages against the proposed Belo Monte dam project on his official website.

However, President Dilma Rousseff did not hear Chief Raoni's appeal and made her decision with little apparent regard for dealing comprehensively with the anticipated severe economic, ecological and social impacts, and with minimal consultation of the indigenous populations. In fact, the building of the dam was later suggested as a part of a huge corruption scheme in the President Rousseff government and Chief Raoni considered the biggest symbol of opposition to the Belo Monte dam.

== 2023 Brazilian presidential inauguration ==
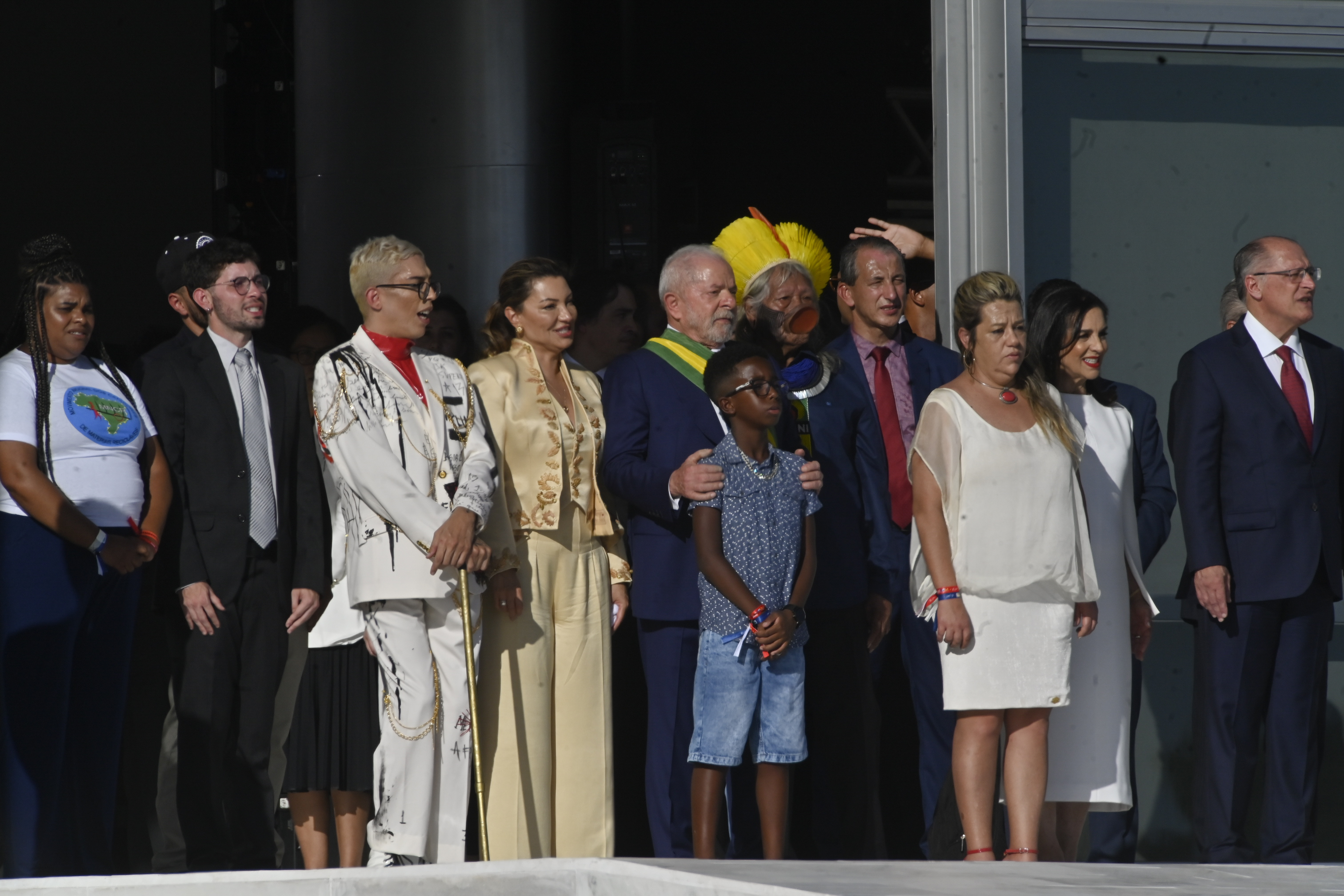
Lula besides the people that delivered him the presidential sash in his third presidential inauguration

On 1 January 2023, Raoni participated in the inauguration ceremony of Luiz Inácio Lula da Silva as president of Brazil. He climbed the ramp to the presidential palace along Lula and 7 other individuals representing several social groups, and participated in the delivery of the presidential sash to the newly sworn in Chief of State, after his predecessor, Jair Bolsonaro, travelled to Orlando, Florida two days before the transfer of office.

== Health ==
In September 2026, the Raoni Institute announced that Raoni had been diagnosed with cancer in his digestive tract, and that he was receiving palliative care.

== Awards ==
Award or decoration	Country	Date
Commander of the Order of Cultural Merit	Brazil	23 October 2007
Grand Cross of the Order of Rio Branco	Brazil	21 November 2023
Chevalier of the Legion of Honour	France	26 March 2024

== See also ==
- Raoni (also known as Raoni: The Fight for the Amazon) is a 1978 Belgian documentary film directed by Jean-Pierre Dutilleux and Luiz Carlos Saldanha. The film portrays issues surrounding the survival of the indigenous Indian tribes of north central Brazil. It was nominated for an Academy Award for Best Documentary Feature.
