= Rainforest Foundation Fund =

- Formation: 1987; 39 years ago
- Type: Non-governmental organization
- Purpose: Environmentalism
- Location: New York City, United States
- Region served: Global
- Method: Grant-making, Lobbying, research
- Key people: Sting, Trudie Styler, Franca Sciuto, Li Lu
- Revenue: $ 1,234,981 (2006)
- Employees: 155
- Website: rainforestfund.org

The Rainforest Foundation Fund is a charitable foundation founded in 1987 and dedicated to drawing attention to rainforests and defending the rights of indigenous peoples living there.

The fund provides support to indigenous rainforest peoples to assert and defend their rights, to define and promote sustainable development in their communities, and to challenge the activities and practices of governments or other entities which damage their environment and lands. The programs and projects are developed in partnership with local communities and representative indigenous NGOs.

== History ==
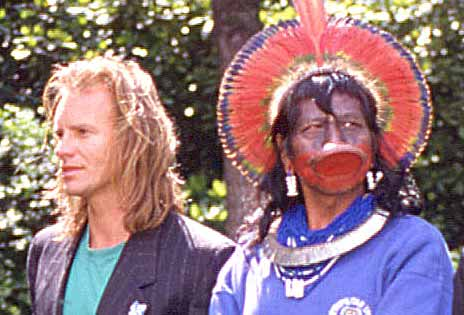
The Chief Raoni and Sting in 1989, in Paris

The Rainforest Foundation Fund was first founded in 1989 as the Rainforest Foundation International, by Sting and his wife Trudie Styler after an indigenous leader, Raoni, of the Kayapo people of Brazil made a personal request to them to help his community protect their lands and culture. Since then, the Rainforest Foundation Fund has funded projects that have protected a total of 28 million acres of forest in 20 different rainforest countries around the globe.

== Philosophy ==
The mission of the Rainforest Foundation Fund is: "to protect and support indigenous people and traditional forest populations in their efforts to protect their environment and fulfill their right to a secure, healthy and ecologically sound environment." The Fund believes that environmental degradation necessarily violates human rights to life, health and culture.

The international community widely accepts that indigenous peoples are holders of a specific set of rights and are also the victims of historically unique forms of discrimination, and it enshrined this idea in the United Nations Declaration on the Rights of Indigenous Peoples, adopted by the UN General Assembly in 2007.

The Rainforest Fund claims that its work is motivated by its recognition of a substantial disconnect between such declarations made by the governments of the world in an international forum, and the actions that those governments undertake in their own countries.

They mention as an illustration the controversy surrounding the Belo Monte Dam in Brazil: "While at the United Nations discussions are underway on the crucial issue of climate change, and governments are finally realizing that they have to change their pattern of development, in the Brazilian Amazon plans are well advanced to build environmentally destructive mega-dams along the Xingu River, the last of the great Amazon rivers in a good state of conservation."

== Method ==
The Rainforest Foundation Fund usually covers only about 80% of a project's total budget, leaving its grantee responsible for finding the remaining 20%, to avoid over-dependency on just one funding source. The fund grants money on a three-year basis, but will extend funding up to five years in certain circumstances. Grant-recipient's projects are evaluated annually.

The Rainforest Foundation Fund works with an extremely small staff, with only a chairperson (Franca Sciuto) and a part-time financial director/treasurer (Li Lu). The chairperson serves as a volunteer, and handles all project screening, interim assessments and post-project evaluations. Final decisions on projects and fund disbursement are made by the Rainforest Foundation Fund board.

Rather than administrating large projects itself, the Fund believes that the primary beneficiaries, the indigenous peoples, should also be the primary administrators of the projects and they work through intermediary organizations to ensure they are equipped with the administrative structures, technology and trained leadership needed to carry out their projects.

== Current work ==
The Rainforest Fund supports projects that defend indigenous people's rights to their lands and to live in a healthy environment.

The Fund assists rainforest indigenous communities by providing funding to help them achieve official demarcation of their territories and then ensure they are able to effectively defend their communities from violations of their rights including illegal logging, mining, other land invasions, and social disenfranchisement/denial of their rights as citizens.

Many of their projects work to uphold the right of indigenous peoples to grant or to withhold. Then their free, prior and informed consent to projects that will affect their land, resources and livelihoods, and to ensure that indigenous communities are given full information and have a voice in project negotiations and the policy design process.

It also makes grants to programs that assist communities in designing sustainable development strategies, and in strengthening their representative organizations.

Their grants support public awareness programs, technological training, community development, organizational capacity building, sustainable resource management, legal defense, and local, national, and international policy and advocacy.

2011 Supported Projects:

Africa:

- Central African Republic
- Cameroon
- Democratic Republic of the Congo

--Working across the three countries of the Congo Basin, this project focuses on the development of REDD policies designed to mitigate climate change. It works to ensure indigenous peoples have a voice in those policies, share in benefits, and have their land rights respected. The project also involves participatory mapping, advocacy surrounding national parks and community forestry, and advocacy for the full implementation of the ILO Convention 169.

Asia:

- Papua New Guinea

--'Land is Life Reform' – A project which supports the legal cases at the national level that are working to stop all new logging operations in the country.

- Malaysia

--In partnership with the Orang Asli communities, this projects works to connect the indigenous people's with conservation networks in the broader civil society, to promote women's empowerment, and to provide capacity-building to organizational leaders as they advocate for indigenous rights.

Americas:

- Belize

--Working with the Mayan community and their NGO the Maya Leaders Alliance to obtain official recognition of nearly 500,000 acres of traditional lands and then to carry out the demarcation qualification process.

- Bolivia

--Supporting a project administered by the NGO Comunidad Viva to guarantee clean water access for the Ayoreo Community of Puesto Paz.

- Brazil

--Working with the Tiriyo, Kaxuyana, and Wayapi indigenous groups of northeastern Brazil to build the capacity of their representative organization, Apitikatxi, and to ensure that public policy respect the indigenous peoples' rights to maintain their cultures and traditions.

--Supporting the Surui indigenous peoples in implementing a strategy for protecting their lands, the Surui Reserve, from illegal logging, thereby protecting the highly biodiverse Amazonian rainforest found on those lands. Also working with them to ensure proper implementation of their community's participation in a REDD program.

- Ecuador

--Supporting a project to assist the Orellana and Sucumbia indigenous peoples whose communities and environments are being negatively affected by oil exploitation – the project works to expose environmental abuse and defend indigenous rights to land, health, livelihood, and clean environment.

--The Fund is working in partnership with UNICEF Ecuador to work to provide clean water to the communities affected by the oil industries' activities in and around their lands, which have caused serious water pollution.

--The Change Chevron Project, monitored by the Rainforest Action Network, works to put public and political pressure on Chevron to rectify the environmental damage its activities in the Ecuadorian Rainforest have caused.

- Guyana

--Working with the national NGO the Amerindian Peoples Association to ensure that Guyanese indigenous communities are well-educated on climate change and REDD programs and that they have a respected and significant degree of participation in the design and implementation of those programs.

- Panama

--Working with the representative NGO of the Guna people, FPCI, as well as the national indigenous NGO, COONAPIP, to build organizational capacity and ensure that Panama's indigenous peoples participate in the design of, have their rights respected by, and are appropriate beneficiaries of various national climate change and REDD programs.

--Working with the Wounaan people to achieve official land titles for over 470,000 acres of land belonging to 12 different communities and to assist them in defending their land and resources from outside threats.

- Peru

--Supporting the Ashaninka communities in their effort to halt the construction of the Pakitzapango Dam which would affect their ancestral land over which they have official ownership. In spite of this, the government did not consult with the communities or receive their consent for the project.

--Working with the Kandozi and Sharpa indigenous peoples of Datem del Marañón in the Peruvian Amazon to ensure that their right to health care is respected and fulfilled by the State, particularly that the government work to address a Hepatitis B epidemic in their communities.

--The Rainforest Fund also recently undertook a special emergency project to provide support for the legal defense of the indigenous leaders facing charges from by the government due to the 2009 incident in Bagua, wherein police attacked the crowd after 55 days of nonviolent demonstrations supporting of indigenous rights, leaving 34 people dead. 109 cases were filed against 362 Peruvian indigenous leaders.

== Criticisms ==
In January 1990 the fund's first campaign came under fire by the French edition of Rolling Stone magazine in an article that mentioned the failings of previous work in the rainforest and criticized the organization for holding lavish fundraising banquets.

The Rolling Stone article was used as the basis for a documentary by Granada Television's 'World in Action' program. The show, called 'Sting and the Indians', was re-broadcast in the United States on the A&E cable network hosted by Bill Kurtis.

The primary claim of both was that the project in Brazil was misrepresenting the facts to donors, as some of the Kayapo's traditional land was already "protected" within the Xingu National Park. In fact, the Xingu Park is actually a large indigenous-controlled area, the first in Brazil, so it is an indigenous territory, not a national "park". Moreover, the Fund's initial project supported demarcation of the Mengkragnoti Area, which is right next to/contiguous with the Xingu Park, and did not demarcate the park itself.

== See also ==
- Deforestation
- Related charities such as the Prince's Rainforests Project and the Rainforest Action Network
- United Nations Environment Programme
- Yayasan Merah Putih
- Self-determination
- Traditional ecological knowledge
- Indigenous land rights
- Global warming
