= List of Indigenous territories (Brazil) =

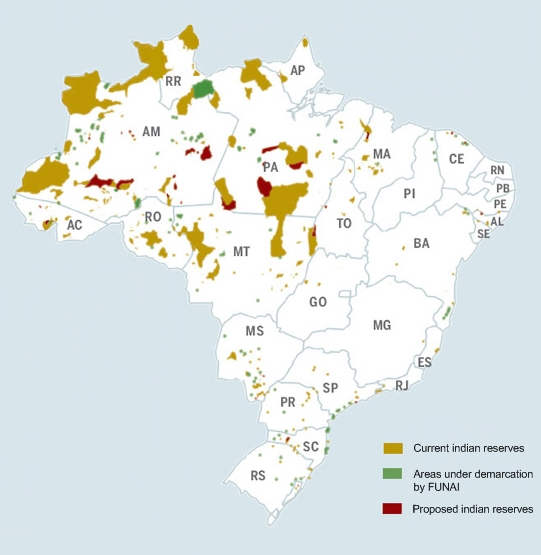
Proposed and approved Indigenous territories in Brazil as of 2008

There are 724 Indigenous territories (Portuguese: Terra Indígena [ˈtɛʁɐ ĩˈdʒiʒẽnɐ], TI) in Brazil, comprising about 13% of the country's land area. According to Article 231 of the Brazilian Constitution, the Indigenous peoples of Brazil possess an inalienable right to lands they "traditionally occupy" (Note: Defined as those lands "on which they live on a permanent basis, those used for their productive activities, those indispensable to the preservation of the environmental resources necessary for their well-being and for their physical and cultural reproduction, according to their uses, customs and traditions.") and are automatically conferred permanent possession of these lands. In practice, Indigenous territories must be formally demarcated to gain full legal protection, which is a multi-stage process overseen by the Fundação Nacional dos Povos Indígenas (FUNAI) and the Ministry of Justice and often involves protracted legal battles.

As of 2020, there were 487 fully demarcated and approved Indigenous territories, covering a total area of more than 100 million hectares. A further 120 territories, comprising around a million hectares, were in the process of being demarcated. For historical reasons—Portuguese colonisation started from the coast—most Indigenous territories are concentrated in the country's interior, particularly in Amazônia. There are only three federated units without any TIs: the states of Rio Grande do Norte and Piauí, and the Federal District.

The following tables list proposed and approved Indigenous territories by state, along with their status in the demarcation process, land area, and approximate population. Most territories are inhabited by a single people and are named after that people and/or a local geographic feature. For example, the Guarani do Bracuí Indigenous Territory is demarcated for the Guarani people that live in the region of the Bracuí River in Rio de Janeiro. Other territories are inhabited by multiple Indigenous peoples.

== Acre ==
Name	Status	Area (ha)	Peoples	Population	References
Alto Rio Purus	Ratified	263,000	Kaxinawá, Kulina, Yaminawá	1871 (2014)	
Alto Tarauacá	Ratified	143,000			
Arara do Rio Amônia	Ratified	21,000	Arara do Rio Amônia	434 (2014)	
Arara/Igarapé Humaitá	Ratified	88,000	Arara Shawãdawa	419 (2014)	
Cabeceira do Rio Acre	Ratified	79,000	Yaminawá	238 (2005)	
Cabeceiras dos rios Muru e Iboiaçu	In identification				
Campinas/Katukina	Ratified	33,000	Katukina Pano	700 (2016)	
Igarapé do Caucho	Ratified	12,000	Kaxinawá	386 (2010)	
Igarapé Taboca do Alto Tarauacá	In identification	287			
Jaminawa do Igarapé Preto	Ratified	26,000	Yaminawá	171 (2010)	
Jaminawa do Rio Caeté	In identification		Yaminawá		
Jaminawa/Arara do Rio Bagé	Ratified	29,000	Arara Shawãdawa, Yaminawá	195 (2010)	
Jaminawa/Envira	Ratified	81,000	Ashaninka, Kulina	77 (2010)	
Kampa do Igarapé Primavera	Ratified	22,000	Ashaninka	26 (2010)	
Kampa do Rio Amônea	Ratified	87,000	Ashaninka	940 (2014)	
Kampa e Isolados do Rio Envira	Ratified	233,000	Ashaninka	283 (2005)	
Katukina/Kaxinawa	Ratified	23,000	Kaxinawá, Shanenawa	1259 (2010)	
Kaxinawa da Colônia Vinte e Sete	Ratified	105	Kaxinawá	114 (2010)	
Kaxinawa do Baixo Jordão	Ratified	9,000	Kaxinawá	172 (2010)	
Kaxinawa do Rio Humaitá	Ratified	127,000	Ashaninka, Kaxinawá, Kulina	331 (2015)	
Kaxinawa do Rio Jordão	Ratified	87,000	Kaxinawá	1470 (2010)	
Kaxinawa do Seringal Curralinho	In identification		Kaxinawá		
Kaxinawa Nova Olinda	Ratified	28,000	Kaxinawá	406 (2010)	
Kaxinawa Praia do Carapanã	Ratified	61,000	Kaxinawá	571 (2010)	
Kaxinawa Seringal Independência	Ratified	15,000	Kaxinawá	209 (2010)	
Kaxinawa/Ashaninka do Rio Breu	Ratified	31,000	Ashaninka, Kaxinawá	503 (2010)	
Kulina do Igarapé do Pau	Ratified	46,000	Kulina	270 (2010)	
Kulina do Médio Juruá	Ratified	730,000	Kulina	2458 (2010)	
Kulina do Rio Envira	Ratified	84,000	Kulina	166 (2010)	
Mamoadate	Ratified	314,000	Manchineri, Yaminawá	763 (2010)	
Manchineri do Seringal Guanabara	In identification		Manchineri		
Nawa	In identification		Nawa	519 (2014)	
Nukini	Ratified	27,000	Nukini	622 (2014)	
Poyanawa	Ratified	24,000	Puyanawa	745 (2014)	
Rio Gregório	Declared	187,000	Katukina Pano, Yawanawá	560 (2013)	
Riozinho do Alto Envira	Ratified	261,000	Ashaninka	101 (2010)	

== Alagoas ==
Name	Status	Area (ha)	Peoples	Population	References
Aconã	Ratified	268	Tingui Botó	78 (2014)	
Fazenda Canto	Ratified	372	Xukuru-Kariri	1294 (2010)	
Jeripancó	In identification		Jiripancó	1757 (2014)	
Kalancó	In identification		Kalankó	329 (2014)	
Karapotó	Ratified	2,000,000	Karapotó	900 (2014)	
Kariri-Xokó	Ratified	4,000,000	Kariri-Xokó	2300 (2013)	
Mata da Cafurna	Ratified	117	Xukuru-Kariri	391 (2010)	
Tingui Botó	Ratified	535	Tingui Botó	326 (2010)	
Tuxá de Inajá/Fazenda Funil	Ratified		Tuxá	1671 (2010)	
Wassu Cocal	Identified^{*}	6,000,000	Wassu	2018 (2014)	
Xukuru-Kariri	Declared	7,000,000	Xukuru-Kariri	1318 (2014)	

== Amazonas ==
Name	Status	Area (ha)	Peoples	Population	References
Acapuri de Cima	Declared	19,000	Kokama	237 (2013)	
Acimã	Ratified	41,000	Apurinã	89 (2010)	
Água Preta/Inari	Ratified	140,000	Apurinã	349 (2010)	
Aldeia Beija Flor	Ratified	41	Baré, Borari, Desana, Kambeba, Marubo, Munduruku, Mura, Sateré Mawé, Tukano, Tuyuka	574 (2014)	
Alto Rio Negro	Ratified	7,999,000	Arapaso, Baniwa, Bará, Barasana, Baré, Desana, Hupda, Karapanã, Koripako, Kotiria, Kubeo, Makuna, Mirity-tapuya, Pira-tapuya, Siriano, Tariana, Tukano, Tuyuka, Warekena, Yuhupde	26046 (2013)	
Alto Sepatini	Ratified	26,000	Apurinã	75 (2013)	
Andirá-Marau	Ratified	789,000	Sateré Mawé	13350 (2014)	
Apipica	Ratified	652	Mura	488 (2013)	
Apurinã do Igarapé Mucuim	Ratified	73,000	Apurinã	93 (2014)	
Apurinã do Igarapé São João	Ratified	18,000	Apurinã	142 (2010)	
Apurinã do Igarapé Tauamirim	Ratified	96,000	Apurinã	295 (2010)	
Apurinã km-124 BR-317	Ratified	42,000	Apurinã	209 (2002)	
Aracá-Padauiri (Baixo Rio Negro)	In identification		Baniwa, Baré, Tukano		
Arary	Ratified	41,000	Mura	200 (2002)	
Ariramba	Ratified	10,000	Mura	73 (1996)	
Auati Paraná (Santa União)	In identification		Ticuna		
Baixo Seruini/Baixo Tumiã	In identification		Apurinã		
Balaio	Ratified	257,000	Baniwa, Baré, Desana, Koripako, Kubeo, Pira-tapuya, Tariana, Tukano, Tuyuka	328 (2013)	
Banawá	Ratified	193,000	Banawá	207 (2014)	
Barreira da Missão	Ratified	2,000	Kaixana, Kambeba, Miranha, Ticuna, Witoto	788 (2011)	
Barro Alto	Ratified	2,000	Kokama	62 (2011)	
Betânia	Ratified	123,000	Ticuna	5341 (2011)	
Boa Vista	Ratified	337	Mura	54 (2010)	
Boca do Acre	Ratified	26,000	Apurinã	248 (2002)	
Bom Intento	Ratified	2,000	Ticuna	378 (2011)	
Cacau do Tarauacá	Ratified	28,000	Kulina	230 (2003)	
Caititu	Ratified	308,000	Apurinã, Jamamadi, Paumari	1022 (2010)	
Cajuhiri Atravessado	Ratified	12,000	Kambeba, Miranha, Ticuna	51 (2010)	
Camadeni	Ratified	151,000	Jamamadi	148 (2010)	
Camicuã	Ratified	59,000	Apurinã	454 (2002)	
Capivara	In identification	650	Mura	247 (2010)	
Catipari/Mamoriá	Ratified	115,000	Apurinã	197 (2002)	
Coatá-Laranjal	Ratified	1,153,000	Munduruku, Sateré Mawé	2484 (2010)	
Cué-Cué/Marabitanas	Declared	809,000	Arapaso, Baniwa, Baré, Desana, Koripako, Pira-tapuya, Tariana, Tukano, Warekena	1864 (2010)	
Cuia	Ratified	1,000	Mura	77 (2010)	
Cuiú-Cuiú	Ratified	36,000	Miranha	721 (2011)	
Cunhã-Sapucaia	Ratified	471,000	Mura	587 (2010)	
Deni	Ratified	1,531,000	Deni, Kulina	1470 (2013)	
Diahui	Ratified	47,000	Jiahui	115 (2014)	
Espírito Santo	Ratified	34,000	Kokama	425 (2011)	
Estrela da Paz	Ratified	13,000	Ticuna	645 (2011)	
Évare I	Ratified	548,000	Ticuna	18086 (2011)	
Évare II	Ratified	176,000	Ticuna	2347 (2011)	
Fortaleza do Castanho	Ratified	3,000	Mura	83 (2010)	
Fortaleza do Patauá	Ratified	743	Apurinã	22 (2010)	
Gavião	Ratified	9,000	Mura	115 (2010)	
Guajahã	Ratified	5,000	Apurinã	65 (2002)	
Guanabara	Declared	16,000	Kokama	382 (2011)	
Guapenu	In identification	2,000	Mura	527 (2010)	
Hi-Merimã	Ratified	678,000			
Igarapé Capanã	Ratified	123,000	Jamamadi	85 (2010)	
Igarapé Grande	Ratified	2,000	Kambeba	52 (2011)	
Igarapé Paiol	In identification		Apurinã		
Ilha do Camaleão	Ratified	236	Kokama, Ticuna	565 (2014)	
Inauini/Teuini	Ratified	469,000	Jamamadi	246 (2010)	
Ipixuna	Ratified	215,000	Parintintin	64 (2010)	
Isolados na Cabeceira do Rio Cuniá	In identification				
Itaitinga	Ratified	135	Mura	25 (2000)	
Itixi Mitari	Ratified	182,000	Apurinã	311 (2010)	
Jacareúba/Katawixi	In identification	647,000			
Jamamadi do Lourdes	In identification		Jamamadi		
Jaminawa da Colocação São Paulino	In identification		Yaminawá		
Jaminawa do Caiapucá	In identification		Yaminawá		
Jaquiri	Ratified	2,000	Kambeba	82 (2010)	
Jarawara/Jamamadi/Kanamanti	Ratified	390,000	Jamamadi, Jarawara	527 (2010)	
Jatuarana	Ratified	5,000	Apurinã	65 (1996)	
Jauary	Identified	25,000	Mura	337 (2014)	
Juma	Ratified	38,000	Juma	15 (2016)	
Jurubaxi-Téa	Identified	1,208,000	Arapaso, Baniwa, Baré, Desana, Dow, Koripako, Pira-tapuya, Tariana, Ticuna, Tukano	904 (2013)	
Kanamari do Rio Juruá	Ratified	596,000	Kanamari	806 (2010)	
Kaxarari	Ratified	146,000	Kaxarari	445 (2014)	
Kaxuyana-Tunayana	Identified	2,184,000	Katxuyana, Tunayana	575 (2010)	
Kulina do Médio Juruá	Ratified	730,000	Kulina	2458 (2010)	
Kumaru do Lago Ualá	Ratified	80,000	Kulina	802 (2011)	
Lago Aiapuá	Ratified	25,000	Mura	623 (2010)	
Lago Beruri	Ratified	4,000	Ticuna	26 (2010)	
Lago Capanã	Ratified	6,000	Mura	197 (2010)	
Lago do Barrigudo	In identification		Apurinã		
Lago do Correio	Ratified	13,000	Kokama, Ticuna	50 (2011)	
Lago do Limão	Declared	8,000	Mura	115 (2014)	
Lago do Marinheiro	Ratified	4,000	Mura	75 (2010)	
Lago Jauari	Ratified	12,000	Mura	187 (2010)	
Lauro Sodré	Ratified	9,000	Ticuna	667 (2011)	
Macarrão	Ratified	44,000	Ticuna	721 (2011)	
Mapari	Ratified	157,000	Kaixana	36 (2011)	
Maraã/Urubaxi	Ratified	94,000	Kanamari	185 (1993)	
Maraitá	Ratified	53,000	Ticuna	181 (2011)	
Marajaí	Ratified	1,000	Matsés	543 (2011)	
Matintin	Ratified	22,000	Ticuna	274 (2011)	
Mawetek	Ratified	115,000	Kanamari	151 (2010)	
Médio Rio Negro I	Ratified	1,776,000	Arapaso, Baniwa, Baré, Desana, Dow, Koripako, Mirity-tapuya, Pira-tapuya, Tariana, Tukano, Yuhupde	1989 (2010)	
Médio Rio Negro II	Ratified	316,000	Arapaso, Baniwa, Baré, Desana, Koripako, Mirity-tapuya, Pira-tapuya, Tariana, Tukano	1367 (2010)	
Méria	Ratified	585	Karapanã, Miranha, Mura, Witoto	68 (2011)	
Miguel/Josefa	Ratified	2,000	Mura	448 (2010)	
Miratu	Ratified	13,000	Karapanã, Miranha, Mura, Witoto	126 (2011)	
Muratuba	In identification		Mura		
Murutinga/Tracajá	Declared	13,000	Mura	1534 (2014)	
Natal/Felicidade	Ratified	313	Mura	118 (2010)	
Nhamundá-Mapuera	Ratified	1,050,000	Hixkaryana, Katuenayana, Katxuyana, Waiwai	1961 (2010)	
Nova Esperança do Rio Jandiatuba	Ratified	20,000	Ticuna	275 (2011)	
Nove de Janeiro	Ratified	229,000	Parintintin	206 (2010)	
Pacovão	In identification				
Padre	Ratified	797	Mura	22 (2003)	
Pantaleão	In identification		Mura		
Paracuhuba	Ratified	927	Mura	134 (2010)	
Paraná do Arauató	Ratified	6,000	Mura	103 (2010)	
Paraná do Boá-Boá	Ratified	241,000	Nadob	347 (2013)	
Paraná do Paricá	Ratified	8,000	Kanamari	34 (2011)	
Patauá	Ratified	615	Kanamari, Mura	47 (1998)	
Paumari do Cuniuá	Ratified	43,000	Apurinã, Paumari	96 (2010)	
Paumari do Lago Manissuã	Ratified	23,000	Paumari	63 (2010)	
Paumari do Lago Marahã	Ratified	119,000	Apurinã, Paumari	1076 (2010)	
Paumari do Lago Paricá	Ratified	16,000	Apurinã, Paumari	159 (2010)	
Paumari do Rio Ituxi	Ratified	8,000	Paumari	235 (2010)	
Peneri/Tacaquiri	Ratified	190,000	Apurinã	791 (2010)	
Pinatuba	Ratified	30,000	Mura	608 (2010)	
Pirahã	Ratified	347,000	Pirahã	592 (2014)	
Ponciano	Declared	4,000	Mura	225 (2014)	
Porto Limoeiro	Ratified	5,000	Ticuna	31 (2011)	
Porto Praia	Ratified	5,000	Ticuna	420 (2011)	
Prosperidade	Ratified	6,000	Kokama	156 (2011)	
Recreio/São Félix	Ratified	251	Mura	172 (2010)	
Rio Apapóris	Ratified	107,000	Desana, Tukano, Tuyuka, Yuhupde	349 (2010)	
Rio Biá	Ratified	1,186,000	Katukina do Rio Biá	488 (2014)	
Rio Jumas	Ratified	9,000	Mura	211 (2010)	
Rio Manicoré	Ratified	19,000	Mura	221 (2010)	
Rio Tea	Ratified	412,000	Baré, Desana, Nadob, Pira-tapuya, Tukano	323 (2010)	
Rio Urubu	Ratified	27,000	Mura	378 (2010)	
Riozinho	Declared	362,000	Kokama, Ticuna	196 (2012)	
Santa Cruz da Nova Aliança	Ratified	6,000	Kokama	339 (2011)	
São Domingos do Jacapari e Estação	Ratified	135,000	Kokama	604 (2011)	
São Francisco do Canimari	Ratified	3,000	Ticuna	130 (2011)	
São Gabriel/São Salvador	In identification		Kokama		
São Leopoldo	Ratified	69,000	Ticuna	1062 (2011)	
São Pedro	Ratified	726	Mura	93 (2010)	
São Pedro do Sepatini	Ratified	28,000	Apurinã	123 (2010)	
São Sebastião	Ratified	61,000	Kaixana, Kokama	494 (2011)	
Sapotal	Ratified	1,000	Kokama	524 (2011)	
Sepoti	Ratified	251,000	Tenharim	110 (2010)	
Seruini/Marienê	Ratified	145,000	Apurinã	159 (2010)	
Setemã	Ratified	50,000	Mura	198 (2010)	
Sissaíma	Declared	9,000	Mura	296 (2014)	
Sururuá	Declared	36,000	Kokama, Ticuna	197 (2011)	
Tabocal	Ratified	907	Mura	16 (2010)	
Tenharim do Igarapé Preto	Ratified	87,000	Tenharim	100 (2011)	
Tenharim Marmelos (Gleba B)	Ratified	475,000	Tenharim	393 (2002)	
Tenharim/Marmelos	Ratified	498,000	Tenharim	535 (2010)	
Tikuna de Santo Antônio	Ratified	1,000	Ticuna	1961 (2011)	
Tikuna Feijoal	Ratified	41,000	Ticuna	4510 (2011)	
Tikuna Porto Espiritual	Ratified	3,000	Ticuna	410 (2011)	
Torá	Ratified	55,000	Apurinã, Torá	326 (2013)	
Trincheira	Ratified	2,000	Mura	251 (2010)	
Trombetas/Mapuera	Ratified	3,971,000	Hixkaryana, Katuenayana, Waiwai	523 (2013)	
Tukuna Umariaçu	Ratified	5,000	Ticuna	7219 (2011)	
Tumiã	Ratified	124,000	Apurinã	66 (2010)	
Tupã-Supé	Ratified	9,000	Ticuna	735 (2011)	
Uati-Paraná	Ratified	127,000	Ticuna	772 (2011)	
Uneiuxi	Ratified	554,000	Nadob	249 (2010)	
Vale do Javari	Ratified	8,544,000	Kanamari, Korubo, Kulina Pano, Marubo, Matis, Matsés, Tsohom-dyapa	4433 (2013)	
Vista Alegre	Identified	13,000	Mura	117 (2014)	
Vui-Uata-In	Ratified	121,000	Ticuna	1898 (2011)	
Waimiri Atroari	Ratified	2,586,000	Waimiri Atroari	1906 (2016)	
Yanomami	Ratified	9,665,000	Yanomami, Ye'kwana	23512 (2016)	
Zuruahã	Ratified	239,000	Zuruahã	171 (2014)	

== Amapá ==
Name	Status	Area (ha)	Peoples	Population	References
Galibi	Ratified	7,000,000	Galibi do Oiapoque, Karipuna do Amapá	151 (2013)	
Juminá	Ratified	42,000,000	Galibi-Marworno, Karipuna do Amapá	61 (2011)	
Tumucumaque	Ratified	3,071,000,000	Aparai, Katxuyana, Tiriyó, Wayana	1700 (2011)	
Uaçá I e II	Ratified	470,000,000	Galibi-Marworno, Karipuna do Amapá, Palikur	4462 (2011)	
Waiãpi	Ratified	607,000,000	Wajãpi	919 (2011)	
Yanwaka	In identification				

== Bahia ==
Name	Status	Area (ha)	Peoples	Population	References
Águas Belas	Ratified	1,000,000	Pataxó	228 (2010)	
Aldeia Velha	Declared	2,000,000	Pataxó	883 (2013)	
Atikun Bahia	In identification		Atikum	39 (2014)	
Barra	Ratified	62	Atikum, Kiriri	183 (2010)	
Barra Velha do Monte Pascoal	Identified^{*}	44,000,000	Pataxó	4649 (2010)	
Brejo do Burgo	Ratified	18,000,000	Pankararé	1309 (2011)	
Caramuru /Paraguassu	Ratified	54,000,000	Pataxó Hã-Hã-Hãe	2801 (2014)	
Comexatiba (Cahy-Pequi)	Identified	28,000,000	Pataxó	732 (2013)	
Coroa Vermelha	Ratified	1,000,000	Pataxó	1546 (1998)	
Fazenda Bahiana (Nova Vida)	Ratified	304	Pataxó Hã-Hã-Hãe	84 (2014)	
Fazenda Remanso	Ratified	327	Tuxá		
Fazenda Sitio	Ratified	414	Tuxá		
Ibotirama	Ratified	2,000,000	Tuxá	792 (2013)	
Imbiriba	Ratified	408	Pataxó	395 (2010)	
Kantaruré	Ratified	2,000,000	Kantaruré	401 (2014)	
Kiriri	Ratified	12,000,000	Kiriri	2498 (2014)	
Massacará	Ratified	8,000,000	Kaimbé	1002 (2011)	
Mata Medonha	Ratified	549	Pataxó	194 (2010)	
Nova Rodelas (área urbana)	Ratified	104	Tuxá	409 (1999)	
Pankararé	Ratified	30,000,000	Pankararé	1562 (2006)	
Pankararu (BA)	Ratified	1,000	Pankararu		
Pankaru	Ratified	1,000	Pankaru		
Quixabá	Ratified	16	Xukuru-Kariri	126 (2003)	
Riacho do Bento	Ratified	4,000,000	Tuxá	708 (1994)	
Tumbalalá	Identified	45,000,000	Tumbalalá	1195 (2014)	
Tupinambá de Belmonte	Identified	10,000,000	Tupinambá	74 (2014)	
Tupinambá de Olivença	Identified	47,000,000	Tupinambá	4631 (2014)	
Tuxá de rodelas	Ratified	4,000,000	Tuxá	1141 (2011)	
Vargem Alegre	Ratified	981	Pankaru	138 (2014)	

== Ceará ==
Name	Status	Area (ha)	Peoples	Population	References
Córrego João Pereira	Ratified	3,000,000	Tremembé	478 (2009)	
Lagoa Encantada	Declared	2,000,000	Jenipapo-Kanindé	328 (2014)	
Mundo Novo/Viração	In identification		Potiguara, Tabajara, Tapuia		
Pitaguary	Declared	2,000,000	Pitaguary	3623 (2014)	
Taba dos Anaces	Ratified	543	Anacé	2018 (2014)	
Tapeba	Identified	6,000,000	Tapeba	6651 (2014)	
Tremembé da Barra do Mundaú	Ratified	4,000,000	Tremembé	580 (2014)	
Tremembé de Acaraú	In identification		Tremembé		
Tremembé de Almofala	Identified	5,000,000	Tremembé	2113 (2011)	
Tremembé de Queimadas	Declared	767	Tremembé	282 (2011)	
Tremembé Mundo Novo/Viração	In identification		Tremembé		

== Distrito Federal ==
Name	Status	Area (ha)	Peoples	Population	References
Kariri-Xokó do Bananal-DF	Ratified	22	Kariri-Xokó, Tuxá		

== Espirito Santo ==
Name	Status	Area (ha)	Peoples	Population	References
Caieiras Velhas II	Ratified	57	Guarani, Guarani Mbya, Guarani Ñandeva	20 (2014)	
Comboios	Ratified	4,000,000	Tupiniquim	534 (2010)	
Tupiniquim	Ratified	14,000,000	Guarani, Guarani Mbya, Guarani Ñandeva, Tupiniquim	2464 (2010)	

== Goiás ==
Name	Status	Area (ha)	Peoples	Population	References
Avá-Canoeiro	Ratified	38,000,000	Avá-Canoeiro	7 (2013)	
Carretão I	Ratified	2,000,000	Tapuia	197 (2014)	
Carretão II	Ratified	77	Tapuia	162 (2010)	
Karajá de Aruanã I	Ratified	14	Karajá	213 (2010)	
Karajá de Aruanã III	Ratified	705	Karajá	45 (2010)	

== Maranhão ==
Name	Status	Area (ha)	Peoples	Population	References
Alto Turiaçu	Ratified	531,000,000	Guajá, Ka'apor, Tembé	1500 (2013)	
Araribóia	Ratified	413,000,000	Guajá, Guajajara	5317 (2010)	
Awá	Ratified	117,000,000	Guajá	42 (2010)	
Bacurizinho	Declared	52,000,000	Guajajara	3663 (2003)	
Cana Brava	Ratified	137,000,000	Guajajara	4510 (2010)	
Caru	Ratified	173,000,000	Guajá, Guajajara	136 (2003)	
Geralda/Toco Preto	Ratified	19,000,000	Guajajara	969 (2010)	
Governador	Ratified	42,000,000	Gavião Pykopjê, Guajajara, Tabajara	655 (2003)	
Kanela	Ratified	125,000,000	Canela Ramkokamekrá	2103 (2011)	
Kanela/Memortumré	Identified	100,000,000	Canela Ramkokamekrá	1961 (2004)	
Krenyê	In identification		Krenyê	104 (2016)	
Krikati	Ratified	145,000,000	Krikatí	1016 (2014)	
Lagoa Comprida	Ratified	13,000,000	Guajajara	805 (2010)	
Morro Branco	Ratified	49	Guajajara	587 (2010)	
Porquinhos dos Canela-Apãnjekra	Declared^{*}	221,000,000	Canela Apanyekrá	677 (2011)	
Rio Pindaré	Ratified	15,000,000	Guajajara	1789 (2014)	
Rodeador	Ratified	2,000,000	Guajajara	126 (2010)	
Urucu-Juruá	Ratified	13,000,000	Guajajara	835 (2010)	
Vila Real	In identification		Guajajara		

== Minas Gerais ==
Name	Status	Area (ha)	Peoples	Population	References
Aranã	In identification		Aranã		
Cinta Vermelha de Jundiba	In identification		Pankararu, Pataxó		
Fazenda Guarani	Ratified	3,000,000	Krenak, Pataxó	335 (2014)	
Kaxixó	Identified	5,000,000	Kaxixó	227 (2014)	
Krenak	Ratified	4,000,000	Krenak	343 (2014)	
Krenak de Sete Salões	In identification		Krenak		
Maxakali	Ratified	5,000,000	Maxakali	1555 (2014)	
Pankararu de Araçuaí	Ratified		Pankararu	258 (2010)	
Riachão/Luiza do Vale	Ratified	10,000,000	Xakriabá	3 (1989)	
Xakriabá	Identified^{*}	43,000,000	Xakriabá	7999 (2014)	
Xakriabá Rancharia	Ratified	7,000,000	Xakriabá	871 (2014)	

== Mato Grosso do Sul ==
Name	Status	Area (ha)	Peoples	Population	References
Água Limpa	In identification		Terena	2888 (2014)	
Aldeia Limão Verde	Ratified	660	Guarani, Guarani Kaiowá	1801 (2014)	
Aldeinha	In identification	4	Terena	403 (2014)	
Amambai	Ratified	2,000,000	Guarani, Guarani Kaiowá, Guarani Ñandeva	8036 (2014)	
Apyka'i	In identification		Guarani Kaiowá		
Arroio-Korá	Ratified	7,000,000	Guarani, Guarani Kaiowá, Guarani Ñandeva	599 (2014)	
Bacia Amambaipeguá	In identification		Guarani, Guarani Kaiowá, Guarani Ñandeva		
Bacia Apapegua	In identification		Guarani, Guarani Kaiowá, Guarani Ñandeva		
Bacia Brilhante-Peguá	In identification		Guarani, Guarani Kaiowá, Guarani Ñandeva		
Bacia Douradopeguá	In identification		Guarani, Guarani Kaiowá, Guarani Ñandeva		
Bacia Dourados-Amambaipeguá	In identification		Guarani, Guarani Kaiowá, Guarani Ñandeva		
Bacia Iguatemipeguá	In identification		Guarani, Guarani Kaiowá, Guarani Ñandeva		
Bacia Nhandeva-Pegua	In identification		Guarani, Guarani Kaiowá, Guarani Ñandeva		
Buriti	Declared	17,000,000	Terena	2543 (2010)	
Buritizinho	Ratified	10	Terena	668 (2010)	
Caarapó	Ratified	4,000,000	Guarani, Guarani Kaiowá, Guarani Ñandeva	4930 (2014)	
Cachoeirinha	Declared	36,000,000	Terena	4920 (2010)	
Cerrito	Ratified	2,000,000	Guarani, Guarani Kaiowá, Guarani Ñandeva	586 (2014)	
Dourados	Ratified	3,000,000	Guarani, Guarani Kaiowá, Guarani Ñandeva, Terena	15023 (2014)	
Dourados-Amambaipeguá I	Identified	56,000,000	Guarani, Guarani Kaiowá	5800 (2016)	
Guaimbé	Ratified	717	Guarani, Guarani Kaiowá	496 (2014)	
Guasuti	Ratified	930	Guarani, Guarani Kaiowá	670 (2014)	
Guató	Ratified	11,000,000	Guató	198 (2014)	
Guyraroká	Declared	11,000,000	Guarani, Guarani Kaiowá	525 (2010)	
Iguatemipeguá I	Identified	42,000,000	Guarani, Guarani Kaiowá, Guarani Ñandeva	1793 (2008)	
Jaguapiré	Ratified	2,000,000	Guarani, Guarani Kaiowá	1093 (2014)	
Jaguari	Ratified	405	Guarani, Guarani Kaiowá, Guarani Ñandeva	383 (2014)	
Jarara	Ratified	479	Guarani, Guarani Kaiowá, Guarani Ñandeva	303 (2014)	
Jata Yvary	Declared	9,000,000	Guarani, Guarani Kaiowá, Guarani Ñandeva	480 (2004)	
Kadiwéu	Ratified	539,000,000	Chamacoco, Kadiwéu, Kinikinau, Terena	1697 (2014)	
Kokue Y	In identification		Guarani, Guarani Kaiowá	181 (2014)	
Lalima	Ratified	3,000,000	Terena	1508 (2014)	
Limão Verde	Ratified	5,000,000	Terena	1267 (2014)	
Ñande Ru Marangatu	Ratified	9,000,000	Guarani, Guarani Kaiowá	1218 (2014)	
Nioaque	Ratified	3,000,000	Terena	1533 (2014)	
Nossa Senhora de Fátima	Ratified	89	Terena		
Ofaié-Xavante	Declared	2,000,000	Ofaié	148 (2014)	
Panambi - Lagoa Rica	Identified	12,000,000	Guarani, Guarani Kaiowá	1016 (2014)	
Panambizinho	Ratified	1,000,000	Guarani, Guarani Kaiowá	414 (2014)	
Pilade Rebuá	Ratified	208	Terena	2104 (2010)	
Pirajuí	Ratified	2,000,000	Guarani, Guarani Ñandeva	2443 (2014)	
Pirakuá	Ratified	2,000,000	Guarani, Guarani Kaiowá	537 (2014)	
Potrero Guaçu	Declared	4,000,000	Guarani, Guarani Ñandeva	786 (2014)	
Rancho Jacaré	Ratified	778	Guarani, Guarani Kaiowá	444 (2014)	
Sassoró	Ratified	2,000,000	Guarani, Guarani Kaiowá, Guarani Ñandeva	2422 (2014)	
Sete Cerros	Ratified	9,000,000	Guarani, Guarani Kaiowá, Guarani Ñandeva	612 (2014)	
Sombrerito	Declared	13,000,000	Guarani, Guarani Ñandeva	209 (2014)	
Sucuriy	Ratified	535	Guarani, Guarani Kaiowá	393 (2014)	
Takuaraty/Yvykuarusu	Ratified	3,000,000	Guarani, Guarani Kaiowá	591 (2010)	
Taquaperi	Ratified	2,000,000	Guarani, Guarani Kaiowá	3339 (2014)	
Taquara	Declared	10,000,000	Guarani, Guarani Kaiowá	294 (2014)	
Taunay/Ipegue	Declared	34,000,000	Terena	4090 (2010)	
Ypoi-Triunfo	Identified	20,000,000	Guarani, Guarani Ñandeva	869 (2009)	
Yvy Katu	Declared	9,000,000	Guarani, Guarani Ñandeva	4030 (2008)	

== Mato Grosso ==
Name	Status	Area (ha)	Peoples	Population	References
Apiaká do Pontal e Isolados	Identified	982,000,000	Apiaká, Munduruku	262 (2013)	
Apiaká-Kayabi	Ratified	109,000,000	Apiaká, Kaiabi, Munduruku	885 (2014)	
Arara do Rio Branco	Ratified	115,000,000	Arara do Rio Branco	249 (2014)	
Areões	Ratified	219,000,000	Xavante	1342 (2010)	
Aripuanã	Ratified	1,603,000,000	Cinta larga	394 (2010)	
Aripuanã	Ratified	751,000,000	Cinta larga	352 (2014)	
Baía dos Guató	Declared	19,000,000	Guató	202 (2014)	
Bakairi	Ratified	61,000,000	Bakairi	734 (2014)	
Batelão	Declared	117,000,000	Kaiabi	150 (2001)	
Batovi	Ratified	5,000,000	Wauja	20 (2013)	
Cacique Fontoura	Declared	32,000,000	Karajá	489 (2001)	
Capoto/Jarina	Ratified	635,000,000	Kayapó, Tapayuna	1388 (2010)	
Chão Preto	Ratified	13,000,000	Xavante	56 (2002)	
Enawenê Nawê	Ratified	742,000,000	Enawenê-nawê	737 (2014)	
Erikpatsa	Ratified	80,000,000	Rikbaktsa	676 (2001)	
Escondido	Ratified	169,000,000	Rikbaktsa	45 (2002)	
Estação Parecis	Declared	2,000,000	Paresí	26 (2014)	
Estivadinho	Ratified	2,000,000	Paresí	37 (2014)	
Figueiras	Ratified	10,000,000	Paresí	21 (2014)	
Ikpeng	In identification		Ikpeng		
Irantxe	Ratified	46,000,000	Iranxe Manoki	373 (2014)	
Japuíra	Ratified	153,000,000	Rikbaktsa	357 (2010)	
Jarudore	Ratified	5,000,000	Bororo		
Juininha	Ratified	71,000,000	Paresí	70 (2010)	
Kapôt Nhinore	In identification		Kayapó, Yudja		
Karajá de Aruanã II	Ratified	893	Karajá		
Kawahiva do Rio Pardo	Declared	412,000,000			
Kayabi	Ratified	1,053,000,000	Apiaká, Kaiabi, Munduruku	768 (2013)	
Krenrehé	Ratified	6,000,000	Krenak, Maxakali		
Lago Grande (Karajá)	In identification		Karajá		
Lagoa dos Brincos	Ratified	2,000,000	Nambikwara	65 (2002)	
Manoki	Declared	206,000,000	Iranxe Manoki	250 (2000)	
Marãiwatsédé	Ratified	165,000,000	Xavante	781 (2013)	
Marechal Rondon	Ratified	99,000,000	Xavante	548 (2010)	
Menkragnoti	Ratified	4,914,000,000		1264 (2010)	
Menkü	Identified^{*}	146,000,000	Menky Manoki	129 (2014)	
Merure	Ratified	82,000,000	Bororo	657 (2010)	
Nambiquara	Ratified	1,012,000,000	Nambikwara	476 (2010)	
Panará	Ratified	500,000,000	Panará	542 (2014)	
Parabubure	Ratified	224,000,000	Xavante	3819 (2010)	
Pareci	Ratified	564,000,000	Paresí	919 (2010)	
Paukalirajausu	Identified	8,000,000	Nambikwara	117 (2014)	
Pequizal	Ratified	10,000,000	Nambikwara	45 (2002)	
Pequizal do Naruvôtu	Ratified	28,000,000	Naruvotu	69 (2003)	
Perigara	Ratified	11,000,000	Bororo	104 (2010)	
Pimentel Barbosa	Ratified	329,000,000	Xavante	1740 (2010)	
Pirineus de Souza	Ratified	28,000,000	Nambikwara	278 (2010)	
Piripkura	In identification	243,000,000			
Ponte de Pedra	Declared	17,000,000	Paresí	427 (2014)	
Portal do Encantado	Declared	43,000,000	Chiquitano	1046 (2010)	
Rio Arraias	In identification		Kaiabi		
Rio Formoso	Ratified	20,000,000	Paresí	166 (2010)	
Roosevelt	Ratified	231,000,000	Apurinã, Cinta larga	1817 (2014)	
Sangradouro/Volta Grande	Ratified	100,000,000	Bororo, Xavante	882 (2010)	
Santana	Ratified	35,000,000	Bakairi	206 (2014)	
São Domingos	Ratified	6,000,000	Karajá	164 (2011)	
São Marcos (Xavante)	Ratified	188,000,000	Xavante	2848 (2010)	
Sararé	Ratified	67,000,000	Nambikwara	188 (2010)	
Serra Morena	Ratified	148,000,000	Cinta larga	131 (2010)	
Sete de Setembro	Ratified	248,000,000	Surui Paiter	1375 (2014)	
Tadarimana	Ratified	10,000,000	Bororo	604 (2014)	
Taihantesu	Ratified	5,000,000	Nambikwara	77 (2001)	
Tapirapé/Karajá	Ratified	66,000,000	Karajá, Tapirapé	512 (2011)	
Terena Gleba Iriri	Ratified	30,000,000	Terena	680 (2010)	
Teresa Cristina	Declared	34,000,000	Bororo	506 (2013)	
Tirecatinga	Ratified	131,000,000	Nambikwara	174 (2010)	
Ubawawe	Ratified	52,000,000	Xavante	395 (2013)	
Uirapuru	Declared	22,000,000	Paresí	28 (2014)	
Umutina	Ratified	28,000,000	Iranxe Manoki, Nambikwara, Paresí, Umutina	489 (2013)	
Urubu Branco	Ratified	168,000,000	Tapirapé	583 (2013)	
Utiariti	Ratified	412,000,000	Paresí	406 (2010)	
Vale do Guaporé	Ratified	243,000,000	Nambikwara	482 (2010)	
Wawi	Ratified	150,000,000	Kisêdjê, Tapayuna	457 (2013)	
Wedezé	Identified	146,000,000	Xavante	100 (2011)	
Xingu	Ratified	2,642,000,000	Aweti, Ikpeng, Kaiabi, Kalapalo, Kamaiurá, Kisêdjê, Kuikuro, Matipu, Mehinako, Nahukuá, Naruvotu, Tapayuna, Trumai, Wauja, Yawalapiti, Yudja	6090 (2013)	
Zoró	Ratified	356,000,000	Zoró	711 (2014)	

== Pará ==
Name	Status	Area (ha)	Peoples	Population	References
Alto Rio Guamá	Ratified	280,000,000	Guajá, Ka'apor, Tembé	1727 (2014)	
Anambé	Ratified	8,000,000	Anambé	161 (2014)	
Andirá-Marau	Ratified	789,000,000	Sateré Mawé	13350 (2014)	
Aningalzinho	In identification				
Apyterewa	Ratified	773,000,000	Parakanã	470 (2016)	
Arara	Ratified	274,000,000	Arara	298 (2014)	
Arara da Volta Grande do Xingu	Ratified	26,000,000	Arara da Volta Grande do Xingu	143 (2014)	
Araweté/Igarapé Ipixuna	Ratified	941,000,000	Araweté	467 (2014)	
Badjônkôre	Ratified	222,000,000	Kayapó	230 (2006)	
Barreirinha	Ratified	2,000,000	Amanayé	86 (2010)	
Baú	Ratified	1,541,000,000	Kayapó	188 (2010)	
Borari/Alter do Chão	In identification		Borari		
Bragança/Marituba	Declared	14,000,000	Munduruku	231 (2008)	
Cachoeira Seca do Iriri	Ratified	734,000,000	Arara	88 (2014)	
Cobra Grande	Identified	9,000,000	Arapium	583 (2008)	
Escrivão	In identification				
Ituna/Itatá	In identification	142,000,000			
Jeju e Areal	In identification		Tembé		
Kapôt Nhinore	In identification		Kayapó, Yudja		
Karajá Santana do Araguaia	Ratified	1,000,000	Karajá	69 (2011)	
Kararaô	Ratified	331,000,000	Kayapó	58 (2014)	
Kaxuyana-Tunayana	Identified	2,184,000,000	Katxuyana, Tunayana	575 (2010)	
Kayabi	Ratified	1,053,000,000	Apiaká, Kaiabi, Munduruku	768 (2013)	
Kayapó	Ratified	3,284,000,000	Kayapó	4548 (2014)	
Koatinemo	Ratified	388,000,000	Asurini do Xingu	182 (2014)	
Kuruáya	Ratified	167,000,000	Kuruaya	163 (2014)	
Las Casas	Ratified	21,000,000	Kayapó	409 (2014)	
Mãe Maria	Ratified	62,000,000	Gavião Kykatejê, Gavião Parkatêjê	760 (2014)	
Marakaxi	Declared	720	Tembé	32 (2013)	
Maranduba	Ratified	375	Karajá	80 (2014)	
Maró	Identified	42,000,000	Arapium, Borari	239 (2008)	
Menkragnoti	Ratified	4,914,000,000	Kayapó	1264 (2010)	
Mundurucu	Ratified	2,382,000,000	Apiaká, Munduruku	6518 (2012)	
Munduruku-Taquara	Declared	25,000,000	Munduruku	171 (2008)	
Nhamundá-Mapuera	Ratified	1,050,000,000	Hixkaryana, Katuenayana, Katxuyana, Waiwai	1961 (2010)	
Nova Jacundá	Ratified	424	Guarani, Guarani Mbya	110 (2010)	
Pacajá	In identification		Asurini do Tocantins		
Panará	Ratified	500,000,000	Panará	542 (2014)	
Paquiçamba	Declared^{*}	16,000,000	Yudja	83 (2012)	
Parakanã	Ratified	352,000,000	Parakanã	1000 (2014)	
Praia do Índio	Ratified	28	Munduruku	125 (2010)	
Praia do Mangue	Ratified	30	Munduruku	168 (2010)	
Rio Paru d'Este	Ratified	1,196,000,000	Aparai, Wayana	240 (2011)	
Sai Cinza	Ratified	126,000,000	Munduruku	1739 (2013)	
Sarauá	Ratified	19,000,000	Amanayé	184 (2010)	
Sawré Apompu (KM 43)	In identification		Munduruku		
Sawré Juyubu (São Luiz do Tapajós)	In identification		Munduruku		
Sawré Muybu (Pimental)	Identified	178,000,000	Munduruku	168 (2014)	
Sororó	Ratified	26,000,000	Aikewara	385 (2014)	
Tembé	Ratified	1,000,000	Tembé, Turiwara	148 (2010)	
Trincheira/Bacajá	Ratified	1,651,000,000	Kayapó, Kayapó Kayapó Xikrin	746 (2011)	
Trocará	Ratified	22,000,000	Asurini do Tocantins	565 (2014)	
Trombetas/Mapuera	Ratified	3,971,000,000	Hixkaryana, Katuenayana, Waiwai	523 (2013)	
Tumucumaque	Ratified	3,071,000,000	Aparai, Katxuyana, Tiriyó, Wayana	1700 (2011)	
Turé Mariquita II	Ratified	587	Tembé		
Turé-Mariquita	Ratified	147	Tembé	38 (2010)	
Tuwa Apekuokawera	Identified	12,000,000	Aikewara	404 (2011)	
Xikrin do Cateté	Ratified	439,000,000	Kayapó, Kayapó Kayapó Xikrin	1183 (2014)	
Xipaya	Ratified	179,000,000	Xipaya	173 (2014)	
Zo´é	Ratified	669,000,000	Zo'é	295 (2016)	

== Paraíba ==
Name	Status	Area (ha)	Peoples	Population	References
Jacaré de São Domingos	Ratified	5,000,000	Potiguara	438 (2010)	
Potiguara	Ratified	21,000,000	Potiguara	14831 (2010)	
Potiguara de Monte-Mor	Declared	7,000,000	Potiguara	9143 (2010)	
Tabajara	In identification		Tabajara		

== Pernambuco ==
Name	Status	Area (ha)	Peoples	Population	References
Atikum	Ratified	16,000,000	Atikum	4404 (2010)	
Entre Serras	Ratified	8,000,000	Pankararu	1072 (2001)	
Fazenda Cristo Rei	In identification		Pankararu		
Fazenda Tapera	In identification		Truká		
Fulni-ô	Ratified	12,000,000	Fulni-ô	4689 (2014)	
Ilha da Tapera/São Felix	Ratified		Truká	250 (2011)	
Kambiwá	Ratified	31,000,000	Kambiwá	3105 (2014)	
Kapinawá	Ratified	12,000,000	Kapinawa	2065 (2014)	
Pankaiuká	In identification		Pankaiuká	150 (2011)	
Pankará da Serra do Arapuá	In identification		Pankará	2836 (2014)	
Pankararu	Ratified	8,000,000	Pankararu	5365 (2010)	
Pipipã	In identification		Pipipã		
Truká	Declared	6,000,000	Truká	5899 (2010)	
Tuxá de Inajá/Fazenda Funil	Ratified		Tuxá	1671 (2010)	
Xucuru	Ratified	28,000,000	Xukuru	7672 (2010)	
Xukuru de Cimbres	Ratified	2,000,000	Xukuru	12006 (2010)	

== Paraná ==
Name	Status	Area (ha)	Peoples	Population	References
Apucarana	Ratified	6,000,000	Kaingang	1752 (2014)	
Avá Guarani/Ocoí	Ratified	251	Guarani, Guarani Ñandeva	743 (2014)	
Barão de Antonina I	Ratified	4,000,000	Guarani, Guarani Ñandeva, Kaingang	460 (2010)	
Boa Vista (Sul)	Declared	7,000,000	Kaingang	169 (2014)	
Cerco Grande	Identified	1,000,000	Guarani, Guarani Mbya	25 (2015)	
Faxinal	Ratified	2,000,000	Kaingang	683 (2014)	
Herarekã Xetá	Identified	3,000,000	Xetá	159 (2013)	
Ilha da Cotinga	Ratified	2,000,000	Guarani, Guarani Mbya	52 (2013)	
Ivaí	Ratified	7,000,000	Kaingang	1552 (2013)	
Ka´aguy Guaxy/Palmital	In identification		Guarani, Guarani Mbya	58 (2014)	
Karuguá (Araçá´i)	In identification		Guarani, Guarani Mbya	68 (2014)	
Mangueirinha	Ratified	16,000,000	Guarani, Guarani Mbya, Kaingang	765 (2013)	
Marrecas	Ratified	17,000,000	Guarani, Guarani Ñandeva, Kaingang	665 (2014)	
Palmas	Ratified	4,000,000	Kaingang	755 (2014)	
Pinhalzinho	Ratified	593	Guarani, Guarani Ñandeva	129 (2013)	
Queimadas	Ratified	3,000,000	Kaingang	610 (2010)	
Rio Areia	Ratified	1,000,000	Guarani, Guarani Mbya	141 (2014)	
Rio das Cobras	Ratified	19,000,000	Guarani, Guarani Mbya, Kaingang	325 (2014)	
Sambaqui	Identified	3,000,000	Guarani, Guarani Mbya	31 (2015)	
São Jerônimo da Serra	Ratified	1,000,000	Guarani, Guarani Ñandeva, Kaingang	674 (2010)	
Tekohá Añetete	Ratified	2,000,000	Guarani, Guarani Ñandeva	510 (2014)	
Tekoha Araguaju	In identification		Guarani, Guarani Ñandeva		
Tekoha Marangatu	In identification		Guarani, Guarani Ñandeva	186 (2013)	
Tekoha Porã	In identification		Guarani, Guarani Ñandeva		
Tibagy/Mococa	Ratified	859	Kaingang	155 (2010)	
Yvyporã Laranjinha	Declared	1,000,000	Guarani, Guarani Ñandeva, Kaingang	201 (2014)	

== Rio de Janeiro ==
Name	Status	Area (ha)	Peoples	Population	References
Arandu Mirim (Saco do Mamanguá)	In identification		Guarani, Guarani Mbya		
Guarani de Araponga	Ratified	213	Guarani, Guarani Mbya	40 (2010)	
Guarani do Bracuí	Ratified	2,000,000	Guarani, Guarani Mbya	379 (2013)	
Guarani do Rio Pequeno	In identification		Guarani, Guarani Mbya		
Parati-Mirim	Ratified	79	Guarani, Guarani Mbya	171 (2010)	
Tekoha Jevy	In identification		Guarani, Guarani Mbya		

== Rio Grande do Norte ==
Name	Status	Area (ha)	Peoples	Population	References
Sagi/Trabanda	In identification				

== Rondônia ==
Name	Status	Area (ha)	Peoples	Population	References
Aripuanã	Ratified	1,603,000,000	Cinta larga	394 (2010)	
Cassupá	Ratified	5	Kassupá	149 (2013)	
Igarapé Lage	Ratified	107,000,000	Wari'	783 (2010)	
Igarapé Lourdes	Ratified	186,000,000	Ikolen, Karo	984 (2013)	
Igarapé Ribeirão	Ratified	48,000,000	Wari'	289 (2010)	
Karipuna	Ratified	153,000,000	Karipuna de Rondônia	55 (2014)	
Karitiana	Ratified	90,000,000	Karitiana	333 (2014)	
Kaxarari	Ratified	146,000,000	Kaxarari	445 (2014)	
Kwazá do Rio São Pedro	Ratified	17,000,000	Aikanã, Kwazá	25 (2001)	
Massaco	Ratified	422,000,000			
Migueleno	In identification		Migueleno		
Pacaás-Novas	Ratified	280,000,000	Wari'	1312 (2010)	
Puruborá	In identification		Puruborá	243 (2014)	
Rio Branco	Ratified	236,000,000	Aikanã, Arikapú, Aruá, Djeoromitxí, Kanoê, Makurap, Tupari	679 (2008)	
Rio Cautário	In identification		Djeoromitxí, Kanoê, Kujubim		
Rio Guaporé	Ratified	116,000,000	Aikanã, Arikapú, Aruá, Djeoromitxí, Kanoê, Kujubim, Makurap, Tupari, Wajuru, Wari'	911 (2010)	
Rio Mequéns	Ratified	108,000,000	Makurap, Sakurabiat	95 (2014)	
Rio Negro Ocaia	Declared^{*}	131,000,000	Wari'	51 (2016)	
Rio Omerê	Ratified	26,000,000	Akuntsu, Kanoê	7 (2016)	
Roosevelt	Ratified	231,000,000	Apurinã, Cinta larga	1817 (2014)	
Sagarana	Ratified	18,000,000	Wari'	342 (2014)	
Sete de Setembro	Ratified	248,000,000	Surui Paiter	1375 (2014)	
Tanaru	In identification	8,000,000	Formerly, the people of the Man of the Hole	0 (2022)	
Tubarão/Latundê	Ratified	117,000,000	Aikanã, Kwazá, Nambikwara	195 (2010)	
Uru-Eu-Wau-Wau	Ratified	1,867,000,000	Amondawa, Juma, Oro Win, Uru-Eu-Wau-Wau	209 (2014)	

== Roraima ==
Name	Status	Area (ha)	Peoples	Population	References
Ananás	Ratified	2,000,000	Macuxi, Wapichana	9 (2016)	
Anaro	Ratified	30,000,000	Wapichana	42 (2015)	
Aningal	Ratified	8,000,000	Macuxi	245 (2015)	
Anta	Ratified	3,000,000	Macuxi, Wapichana	183 (2015)	
Araçá	Ratified	50,000,000	Macuxi, Wapichana	2016 (2015)	
Barata/Livramento	Ratified	13,000,000	Macuxi, Wapichana	710 (2010)	
Bom Jesus	Ratified	859	Macuxi, Wapichana	57 (2015)	
Boqueirão	Ratified	16,000,000	Macuxi, Wapichana	464 (2015)	
Cajueiro	Ratified	4,000,000	Macuxi	168 (2015)	
Canauanim	Ratified	11,000,000	Macuxi, Wapichana	982 (2015)	
Jaboti	Ratified	14,000,000	Macuxi, Wapichana	380 (2015)	
Jacamim	Ratified	193,000,000	Wapichana	1461 (2015)	
Malacacheta	Ratified	29,000,000	Wapichana	1073 (2010)	
Mangueira	Ratified	4,000,000	Macuxi, Wapichana	93 (2015)	
Manoá/Pium	Ratified	43,000,000	Macuxi, Wapichana	2268 (2015)	
Moskow	Ratified	14,000,000	Macuxi, Wapichana	626 (2015)	
Muriru	Ratified	6,000,000	Wapichana	184 (2015)	
Ouro	Ratified	14,000,000	Macuxi	189 (2015)	
Pirititi	In identification	40,000,000			
Pium	Ratified	5,000,000	Macuxi, Wapichana	325 (2015)	
Ponta da Serra	Ratified	16,000,000	Macuxi, Wapichana	315 (2015)	
Raimundão	Ratified	4,000,000	Macuxi, Wapichana	385 (2015)	
Raposa Serra do Sol	Ratified	1,747,000,000	Ingarikó, Macuxi, Patamona, Taurepang, Wapichana	23119 (2015)	
Santa Inês	Ratified	30,000,000	Macuxi	195 (2015)	
São Marcos	Ratified	654,000,000	Macuxi, Taurepang, Wapichana	5838 (2015)	
Serra da Moça	Ratified	12,000,000	Wapichana	697 (2015)	
Sucuba	Ratified	6,000,000	Macuxi, Wapichana	343 (2015)	
Tabalascada	Ratified	13,000,000	Macuxi, Wapichana	682 (2015)	
Trombetas/Mapuera	Ratified	3,971,000,000	Hixkaryana, Katuenayana, Waiwai	523 (2013)	
Truaru	Ratified	6,000,000	Wapichana	413 (2015)	
Waimiri Atroari	Ratified	2,586,000,000	Waimiri Atroari	1906 (2016)	
WaiWái	Ratified	406,000,000	Waiwai	365 (2013)	
Yanomami	Ratified	9,665,000,000	Yanomami, Ye'kwana	23512 (2016)	

== Rio Grande do Sul ==
Name	Status	Area (ha)	Peoples	Population	References
Água Grande	Ratified	165	Guarani, Guarani Mbya	53 (2010)	
Arroio do Conde	In identification		Guarani, Guarani Mbya		
Borboleta	In identification		Kaingang		
Cacique Doble	Ratified	4,000,000	Guarani, Guarani Mbya, Guarani Ñandeva, Kaingang	815 (2010)	
Cantagalo	Ratified	283.67	Guarani, Guarani Mbya	145 (2010)	
Capivari	Ratified	43	Guarani, Guarani Mbya	60 (2014)	
Carazinho	In identification		Kaingang	75 (2013)	
Carreteiro	Ratified	602	Kaingang	197 (2014)	
Coxilha da Cruz	Ratified	202	Guarani, Guarani Mbya	128 (2010)	
Estrela	In identification		Kaingang	125 (2014)	
Guarani Barra do Ouro	Ratified	2,000,000	Guarani, Guarani Mbya	269 (2014)	
Guarani de Águas Brancas	Declared	230	Guarani, Guarani Mbya	39 (1994)	
Guarani no Lami	In identification		Guarani		
Guarani Votouro	Ratified	717	Guarani, Guarani Ñandeva	43 (2010)	
Guarita	Ratified	23,000,000	Guarani, Guarani Mbya, Guarani Ñandeva, Kaingang	5776 (2014)	
Inhacapetum	Ratified	236	Guarani, Guarani Mbya	180 (2010)	
Inhacorá	Ratified	3,000,000	Kaingang	1133 (2014)	
Irapuã	Declared	222	Guarani, Guarani Mbya	77 (2014)	
Itapuã	In identification				
Ka´aguy Poty	In identification		Guarani, Guarani Mbya	55 (2014)	
Kaingang de Iraí	Ratified	280	Kaingang	644 (2013)	
Lageado do Bugre	In identification		Kaingang	112 (2014)	
Ligeiro	Ratified	5,000,000	Kaingang	1453 (2014)	
Lomba do Pinheiro	In identification		Guarani		
Mato Castelhano-FÁg TY KA	Identified	4,000,000	Kaingang	304 (2014)	
Mato Preto	Declared	4,000,000	Guarani, Guarani Mbya, Guarani Ñandeva	78 (2014)	
Monte Caseros	Ratified	1,000,000	Kaingang	568 (2013)	
Morro do Coco	In identification				
Morro do Osso	In identification		Kaingang		
Nonoai	Ratified	15,000,000	Guarani, Guarani Mbya, Guarani Ñandeva, Kaingang	2638 (2010)	
Nonoai Rio da Várzea	Ratified	16,000,000	Kaingang	548 (2010)	
Novo Xengu	In identification		Kaingang	135 (2014)	
Pacheca	Ratified	2,000,000	Guarani, Guarani Mbya	72 (2010)	
Passo Grande	In identification		Guarani, Guarani Mbya		
Passo Grande do Rio Forquilha	Declared	2,000,000	Kaingang	1008 (2014)	
Petim/Arasaty	In identification		Guarani, Guarani Mbya		
Ponta da Formiga	In identification		Guarani, Guarani Mbya		
Pontão	In identification				
Por Fi Ga	Ratified	8	Kaingang	128 (2014)	
Rio dos Índios	Ratified	715	Kaingang	143 (2014)	
Salto Grande do Jacuí	Ratified	234	Guarani, Guarani Mbya	423 (2014)	
Serrinha	Ratified	12,000,000	Kaingang	1760 (2013)	
Taim	In identification		Guarani, Guarani Mbya		
Varzinha	Ratified	776	Guarani, Guarani Mbya	64 (2010)	
Ventarra	Ratified	772	Kaingang	211 (2010)	
Votouro	Ratified	3,000,000	Kaingang	1055 (2010)	
Votouro-Kandóia	Identified	6,000,000	Kaingang	176 (2010)	

== Santa Catarina ==
Name	Status	Area (ha)	Peoples	Population	References
Aldeia Kondá	Ratified	2,000,000	Kaingang	379 (2010)	
Amâncio e Mbiguaçu	In identification		Guarani		
Cachoeira dos Inácios	Ratified	80	Guarani, Guarani Mbya	316 (2014)	
Cambirela	In identification		Guarani, Guarani Mbya		
Garuva	In identification		Guarani, Guarani Mbya	30 (2014)	
Guarani de Araça'í	Declared	3,000,000	Guarani, Guarani Ñandeva	73 (2010)	
Ibirama-La Klãnõ	Declared	37,000,000	Guarani, Guarani Mbya, Guarani Ñandeva, Kaingang, Xokleng	2057 (2013)	
Massiambu/Palhoça	In identification		Guarani, Guarani Mbya		
Mbiguaçu	Ratified	59	Guarani, Guarani Mbya, Guarani Ñandeva	114 (2010)	
Morro Alto	Declared	893	Guarani, Guarani Mbya	159 (2014)	
Morro dos Cavalos	Declared	2,000,000	Guarani, Guarani Mbya, Guarani Ñandeva	119 (2010)	
Palmas	Ratified	4,000,000	Kaingang	755 (2014)	
Pindoty	Declared	3,000,000	Guarani, Guarani Mbya	70 (2003)	
Piraí	Declared	3,000,000	Guarani, Guarani Mbya	155 (2010)	
Rio dos Pardos	Ratified	758	Xokleng	22 (2014)	
Tarumã	Declared	2,000,000	Guarani, Guarani Mbya	20 (2010)	
Toldo Chimbangue	Ratified	988	Kaingang	531 (2010)	
Toldo Chimbangue II	Ratified	954	Guarani, Guarani Mbya, Guarani Ñandeva, Kaingang	84 (2010)	
Toldo Imbu	Declared	2,000,000	Kaingang	381 (2014)	
Toldo Pinhal	Declared	5,000,000	Kaingang	189 (2014)	
Xapecó	Ratified	16,000,000	Guarani, Guarani Mbya, Kaingang	5338 (2010)	
Xapecó Glebas A e B	Declared	660	Kaingang	845 (2001)	

== Sergipe ==
Name	Status	Area (ha)	Peoples	Population	References
Caiçara/Ilha de São Pedro	Ratified	4,000,000	Xokó	340 (2014)	

== São Paulo ==
Name	Status	Area (ha)	Peoples	Population	References
Aldeia Renascer	In identification		Guarani, Guarani Ñandeva		
Amba Porã	Identified	7,000,000	Guarani, Guarani Mbya	67 (2010)	
Araribá	Ratified	2,000,000	Guarani, Guarani Ñandeva, Terena	616 (2014)	
Barragem	Ratified	26	Guarani, Guarani Mbya	867 (2010)	
Boa Vista do Sertão do Promirim	Identified	5,000,000	Guarani, Guarani Mbya	175 (2013)	
Djaiko-aty	Identified	1,000,000	Guarani, Guarani Mbya, Guarani Ñandeva	42 (2012)	
Guarani de Barão de Antonina	In identification		Guarani, Guarani Ñandeva	117 (2014)	
Guarani de Itaporanga	In identification		Guarani, Guarani Ñandeva	31 (2014)	
Guarani do Aguapeú	Ratified	4,000,000	Guarani, Guarani Mbya	95 (2010)	
Guarani do Krukutu	Ratified	26	Guarani, Guarani Mbya	254 (2010)	
Icatu	Ratified	301	Kaingang, Terena	148 (2014)	
Itaóca	Declared	533	Guarani, Guarani Mbya, Guarani Ñandeva	89 (2010)	
Itariri (Serra do Itatins)	Ratified	1,000,000	Guarani, Guarani Ñandeva	88 (2014)	
Jaraguá	Declared^{*}	530	Guarani, Guarani Mbya, Guarani Ñandeva	586 (2013)	
Ka´aguy Mirim	Identified	1,000,000	Guarani, Guarani Mbya	114 (2014)	
Ka´agy Hovy	In identification		Guarani, Guarani Mbya		
Pakurity (Ilha do Cardoso)	Identified	6,000,000	Guarani, Guarani Mbya	130 (2016)	
Peguaoty	Identified	6,000,000	Guarani, Guarani Mbya	126 (2014)	
Peruíbe	Ratified	480	Guarani, Guarani Ñandeva	134 (2010)	
Piaçaguera	Ratified	3,000,000	Guarani, Guarani Ñandeva	350 (2010)	
Pindoty/Araçá-Mirim	Identified	1,000,000	Guarani, Guarani Mbya	84 (2012)	
Ribeirão Silveira	Declared	9,000,000	Guarani, Guarani Mbya, Guarani Ñandeva	474 (2014)	
Rio Branco (do Itanhaém)	Ratified	3,000,000	Guarani, Guarani Mbya	94 (2014)	
Takuari Eldorado	Ratified	2,000,000	Guarani, Guarani Mbya, Guarani Ñandeva	492 (2013)	
Tapy'i (Rio Branquinho)	In identification		Guarani, Guarani Mbya		
Tekoa Guaviraty (Subaúma)	In identification		Guarani, Guarani Mbya		
Tekoa Itaoka (Icapara II)	In identification		Guarani, Guarani Mbya		
Tekoa Jejyty (Toca do Bugio)	In identification		Guarani, Guarani Mbya		
Tenondé Porã	Declared	16,000,000	Guarani, Guarani Mbya, Guarani Ñandeva	1175 (2015)	
Vanuire	Ratified	709	Kaingang, Krenak	177 (2010)	

== Tocantins ==
Name	Status	Area (ha)	Peoples	Population	References
Apinayé	Ratified	142,000,000	Apinayé	2342 (2014)	
Araguaia	Ratified	1,359,000,000	Avá-Canoeiro, Javaé, Karajá, Tapirapé	3279 (2010)	
Cacique Fontoura	Declared	32,000,000	Karajá	489 (2001)	
Canoanã	In identification		Javaé		
Funil	Ratified	16,000,000	Xerente	348 (2011)	
Inãwébohona	Ratified	377,000,000	Avá-Canoeiro, Javaé, Karajá	186 (2011)	
Krahô-Kanela	Ratified	8,000,000	Krahô-Kanela	122 (2014)	
Kraolândia	Ratified	303,000,000	Krahô	2992 (2014)	
Maranduba	Ratified	375	Karajá	80 (2014)	
Taego Ãwa	Declared	29,000,000	Avá-Canoeiro	25 (2012)	
Utaria Wyhyna/Iròdu Iràna	Declared	177,000,000	Javaé, Karajá	116 (2011)	
Wahuri	In identification		Javaé	207 (2014)	
Xambioá	Ratified	3,000,000	Guarani, Guarani Mbya, Karajá do Norte	363 (2013)	
Xerente	Ratified	168,000,000	Xerente	2693 (2011)	

== See also ==
- List of Indigenous peoples of Brazil
