= Tuira =

Tuira may refer to:

- Tuira River, a river in Panama
- Tuira, Oulu, a neighbourhood in Oulu, Finland
- Tuíre Kayapó (Tuíra), Brazilian indigenous rights activist, environmentalist, and a Kayapó chief
