= Metyktire =

Subgroup of the Kayapo people of Brazil

Total population
- 87 (2007)

Regions with significant populations
- Brazil (Menkragnoti Indigenous Territory)

Languages
- Kayapo language

The Metyktire are a subgroup of the Kayapo people of Brazil. They live on the Menkregnoti reservation in the Amazon River basin. They are estimated to have about 87 members. They were discovered in May 2007 when two tribesmen entered a Kayapo village in the Menkregnoti reservation. The Metyktire form part of the Kayapo people and speak an archaic version of the Kayapo language.

When discovered, they had not had any known contact with Western civilization. This was attributed to their location on the 12,100,000-acre (49,000 km^{2}) reservation, in an area difficult to access due to dense jungle and lack of nearby rivers. The Metyktire had had little to no recent contact with other Kayapo until the 2007 visit. The Kayapo believe the Metyktire formed when several families fled deeper into the jungle in the 1950s.

Neither men nor women wear clothes. Men wear penis-protection. The women shave their heads.
