= Feira da Mata =

Municipality of Bahia, Brazil

Feira da Mata Município de Feira da Mata
- Municipality
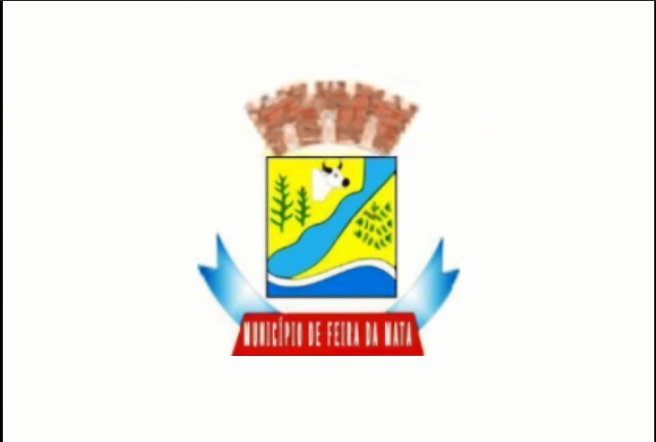
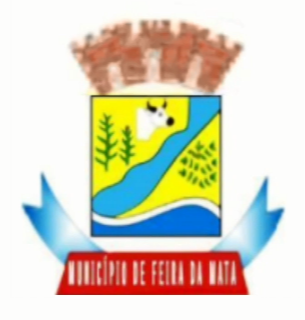
- Flag Coat of arms

- Location of Feira da Mata in Bahia

- Location of Feira da Mata in Brazil
- Coordinates: 14°12′25″S 44°16′51″W
- Country: Brazil
- Region: Northeast
- State: Bahia
- Founded: 1989

Government
  - Mayor: Alex Ronan Viana Mota

Area
  - Total: 1,176.105 km^{2} (454.097 sq mi)
- Elevation: 497 m (1,631 ft)

Population (2020)
  - Total: 5,661
  - Density: 4.813/km^{2} (12.47/sq mi)
- Demonym: Matense
- Time zone: UTC−3 (BRT)

Feira da Mata is a municipality in the state of Bahia in the North-East region of Brazil. Feira da Mata covers 1,176.105 km^{2} (454.097 mi^{2}), and has a population of 5,661 with a population density of 5 inhabitants per square kilometer. It was originally part of Carinhanha, but became an independent municipality in 1989.

Feira da Mata is located at the junction of BA-601 and BA-594. It is 964 kilometres (599 mi) from the state capital of Bahia, Salvador. The Carinhanha River forms the southern border of the municipality, which is also the border between the states of Bahia and Minas Gerais.

Feira da Mata was originally home to the Kayapo people. Manuel Nunes Viana expelled the Kayapo population in the early 18th century and settled in the area.

== See also ==
- List of municipalities in Bahia
