= Kararao =

Tribe of the Kayapo nation of Brazil

The Kararao are a tribe of the Kayapo nation of Brazil. As of 2004, contacted Kararao numbered only 29 individuals and a further 50 or so remain uncontacted. The Kararao live in the Terra Indigena Kararahô in Pará (Area-3308.37 km²).
