= The Kayapo: Out of the Forest =

1989 documentary film

- Directed by: Michael Beckham
- Release date: 1989
- Running time: 52 minutes

The Kayapo: Out of the Forest is a 1989 color documentary film and the second of two films, the first being the 1987 film The Kayapo. Both films were directed by Michael Beckham with assistance by Terry Turner, a consulting anthropologist.

The film focuses on the conflict between the Kayapo Indian Nation and the Electronorte power development company of the Brazilian government, along with the World Bank, who will be the source of funding. Electronorte is pushing to construct a dam near the Kayapo village, which if built would flood much of the Kayapo's land. This film documents the plight of the Kayapo Indians and their struggle to not only save their village but also the rivers and rainforest of Brazil, which they state will be irrefutable destroyed if the Kararao dam is built.

== Synopsis ==
The Kayapo Indians of Central Brazil are faced with an unwanted development that could bring devastation to their villages and the rainforest. This in turn brought the reunification of the thirteen Kayapo villages along with forty other Indian nations in an organized protest to protect it. The Kayapo chiefs and key leaders, especially Chief Payakan, are ready to defend their land from the development of the Kararao dam on the Xingu river by means of a political demonstration in-front of the international media. If the dam is built, the Xingu river will flood onto very large areas of Kayapo territory. A neighboring dam, the Tucuri dam, is highlighted in the film as an example of the possible ramifications building a new dam could bring.

== Cast ==
- Kayapo Chief Payakan
- Chief Ropni
- Chief Pombo
- Chief Komari
- Chikari
- Kubini Kynti
- Sting
- Kokomu
- Jose Antonio Muniz (Chief Engineer Electronorte).

== Production ==
The films were shot on location in the lowlands of South America, in Central Brazil, where the Kayapo Indians inhabit a large area of land near the Xingu River.

== Release information ==
The Kayapo: Out of the Forest was first released to view on ITV in 1989 on the 13th of June.

== Reception ==
This film received mixed reviews, as some criticized the lack of a more in-depth account as to the relationship between foreign banks and investors and the Amazonian hydroelectric project. In another review the film is depicted as being a great educational addition in the studies of anthropology and ecology.
