= Altamira Gathering =

The Altamira Gathering was a five-day media conference organized by the Kayapo people in an effort to raise awareness of the ecological and political atrocities committed by the Brazilian government and illegal gold mining.

Between February 19 and 24 in 1989 over 600 Amazonian Indians gathered at the port city of Altamira at the banks of the Xingu river. The protest was organized by the Coordination of the Indigenous Organizations of the Brazilian Amazon.

The Altamira Gathering was the first large gathering of all groups that were threatened by the creation of the Belo Monte Dam, originally called the Kararao Dam but renamed at the time of the gathering. Over 500 Kayapo and 100 members of 40 other indigenous nations whom the Kayapo invited to join them rallied to voice their views on the dams and the destruction of the forest. Five days of meetings, speeches, press conferences, and ritual performances by the Kayapo were executed without a major hitch. Plans for the hydro-electric dams that were proposed on the Xingu River were not clearly outlined to the surrounding communities, according to local Indigenous groups. Concerns arose as the plans for a dam were expected to result in flooding in areas inhabited by Indigenous communities.

This created discourse about displacement issues, and how cultural connections to the land seemed to be disregarded. It was argued that the dams proposal prioritized Brazilian national development projects over the livelihood and safety of the populations most affected by its implementation.

Much of the credit for the event belongs to the Ecumenical Center for Documentation and Information. The event required handling many logistical tasks that led to the success of the meeting; this included the transportation, lodging, and feeding of hundreds of indigenous people while constructing a large encampment with traditional Kayapo shelters at a Catholic church retreat outside the town. Transport for the indigenous peoples was funded by Anita Roddick of the Body Shop.

After being picked up by the international media circuit the Pope sent a telegram and rockstar Sting flew in to give a press conference in support of the Altamira Gathering. Other visitors and speakers included British parliamentarian Tam Dalyell, and the environmentalist José Lutzemberger. The event was in the short term successful due to the large international support raised by the media; TV crews from four continents were present. Within two weeks the World Bank announced that it would not confer the loan earmarked for the dam. The Brazilian National Congress also announced plans to conduct a formal investigation into the entire plan. A 1992 World Bank report, World Bank Approaches to the Environment in Brazil: A Review of Selected Projects (Report No. 10039) indicates the negative impact of large-scale development projects that contributed to social and environmental concerns. Following the Altamira Gathering, President José Sarney criticized environmentalists and Indigenous activists involved in the movement, describing them as the “new imperialists”, stating that foreign influence had interfered with development in Brazil. The Brazilian Government also disclosed the organization of a six-man commission of enquiry to look into who was involved in the Altamira Gathering. According to a report by The Gaia Foundation, it was detailed that there was an international resistance to large-scale infrastructure projects in Brazil, involving a recent denial from the World Bank for a road crossing from Acre in Western Amazonia through the Andes to Peru.

However, there was also vociferous support for the dam from local trade organizations and trade unions, for whom the hydroelectric scheme represented progress and prosperity. After protracted political delays and redesigns, and a second 'gathering' of indigenous peoples at Altamira in May 2008, work on the dam commenced in 2011.
