= Tuíre Kayapó =

Brazilian activist (1969/1970–2024)

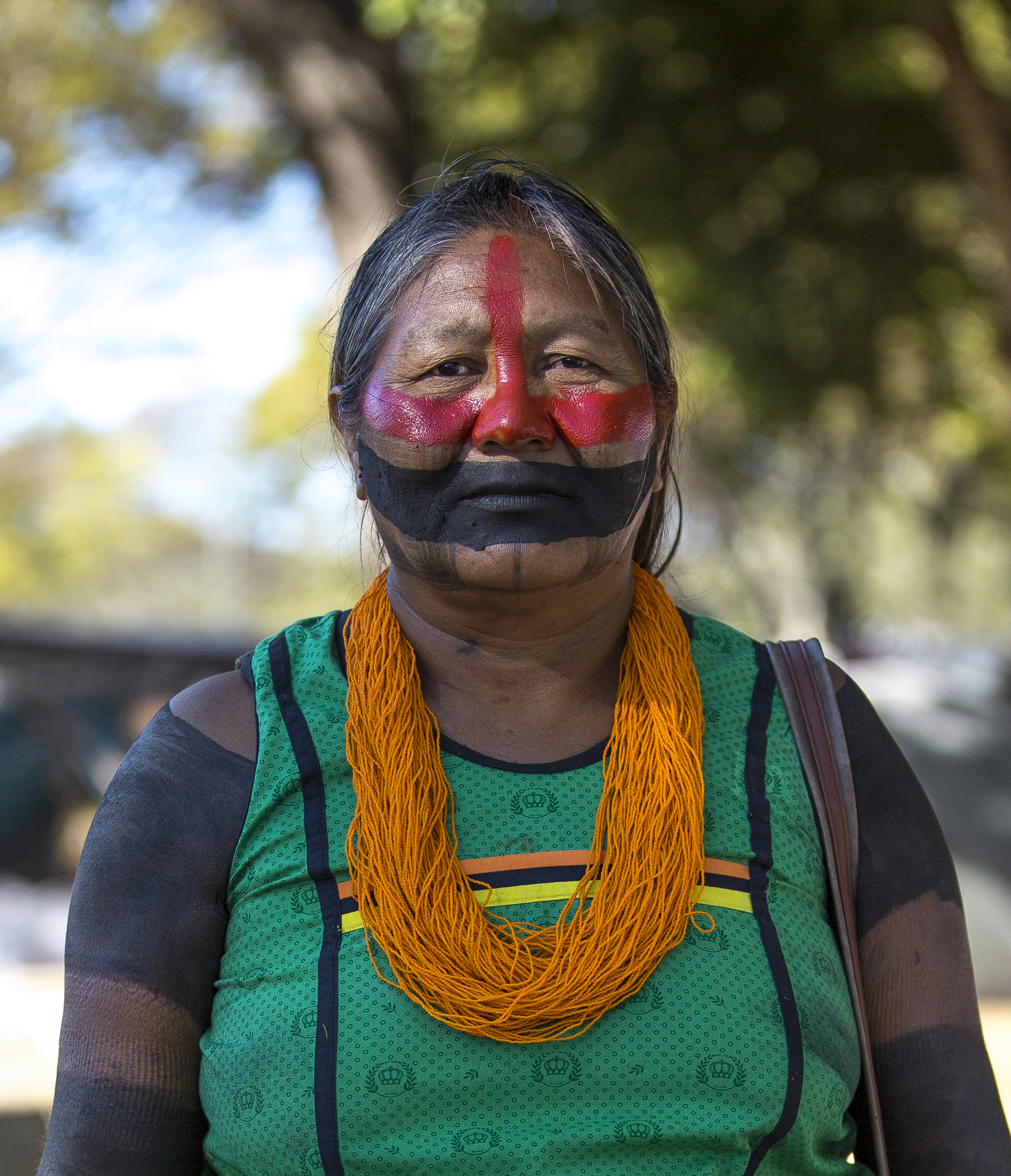
- Tuire in 2019
- Born: 1969 or 1970; Kokrajmoro, Pará, Brazil
- Died: 10 August 2024; Redenção, Pará, Brazil
- Relatives: Paulinho Paiakan (brother)

Tuíre Kayapó, also called Tuíra (1969 or 1970 – 10 August 2024), was a Brazilian indigenous rights activist, environmentalist, and a chief of the Kayapó people. She was active in the movement against the Belo Monte Dam project on the Xingu River in the 1980s and constitutional amendment PEC 215 in the 2010s.

== Early life ==
Tuíre's father was born in the village of Kubēnkrãkêj. He met her mother in her home village of Kokrajmoro (also spelled Kokraimoro), which was also where Tuíre was born. Her grandmother named her. Growing up, Tuíre's grandfathers and uncle were Kayapó leaders who defended their lands against government incursions. Her paternal grandfather, Betikré, died during one of these conflicts. From a young age, her family encouraged her to also become a warrior and to defend her people.

At age 17, Tuíre and her family moved back to her father's village, Kubēnkrãkêj. Her parents died shortly afterwards. Tuíre and her infant son moved to the village of Aukre, where she met her husband, Takaktô, from the village of Gorotire. They married soon afterwards.

== Activism ==
In 1989, at age 19, Tuíre attended a meeting in Altamira, Pará, with officials from the Belo Monte Dam. She brandished her machete in the face of an Eletronorte official in protest of the dam's construction. The photo taken of the event brought her name into the public consciousness. By the 1990s, Tuire began travelling abroad, including to the United States, to spread awareness of her people's political struggles.

Tuíre took her uncle's place when he died, and faced little resistance from her community, although she was one of the first women chiefs of the group.

She went to Congress to speak on behalf of the Kayapo and other indigenous groups. She chose to speak in Mebêngôkre during these events, and had an interpreter translate for her. She also advocated for indigenous groups' access to electricity and spoke out against the expansion of mining efforts in indigenous land. She strongly criticized the passing of PL do Marco Temporal in 2023, a law which limited indigenous claims to land.

In August 2019, she helped organize the first March of Indigenous Women of Brazil in Brasília. The following year, she helped lead the Meeting of the Mebengokrê Peoples and indigenous leaders of Brazil in Mato Grosso.

== Recognition ==
In 2020, Turkish artist and photographer Pinar Yolaçan released a film about Tuíre's life, entitled Tuire Kayapó (First Contact). Yolaçan and Tuíre had first met during a residency Yolaçan had in Bolivia in the late 2010s. In 2024, painter Éder Oliveira unveiled a portrait of Tuíre.

== Personal life and death ==
Tuíre lived in and was chief of the village of Kaprãnkrere, in Terra Indígena Las Casas, Pará. She was married to Takaktô (also spelled Kôkôto) Chief Dudu, with whom she had two daughters. One of her grandchildren was named after her. She was the sister of activist Paulinho Paiakan and the aunt of aspiring politician Maial Panhpunu Paiakan.

Tuíre was diagnosed with uterine cancer in 2023, and began undergoing treatment that same year. She died from the disease on 10 August 2024, while receiving palliative care in Redenção, Pará. Her family confirmed she would be buried in Gorociré, a Kayapó village about 60 kilometers from Cumaru do Norte. She received tributes online from President Luiz Inácio Lula da Silva, Minister of Indigenous Peoples Sonia Guajajara, the Federation of Indigenous Peoples of Pará, and the Fundação Nacional dos Povos Indígenas.
