= Quilombola =

Resident of a quilombo settlement

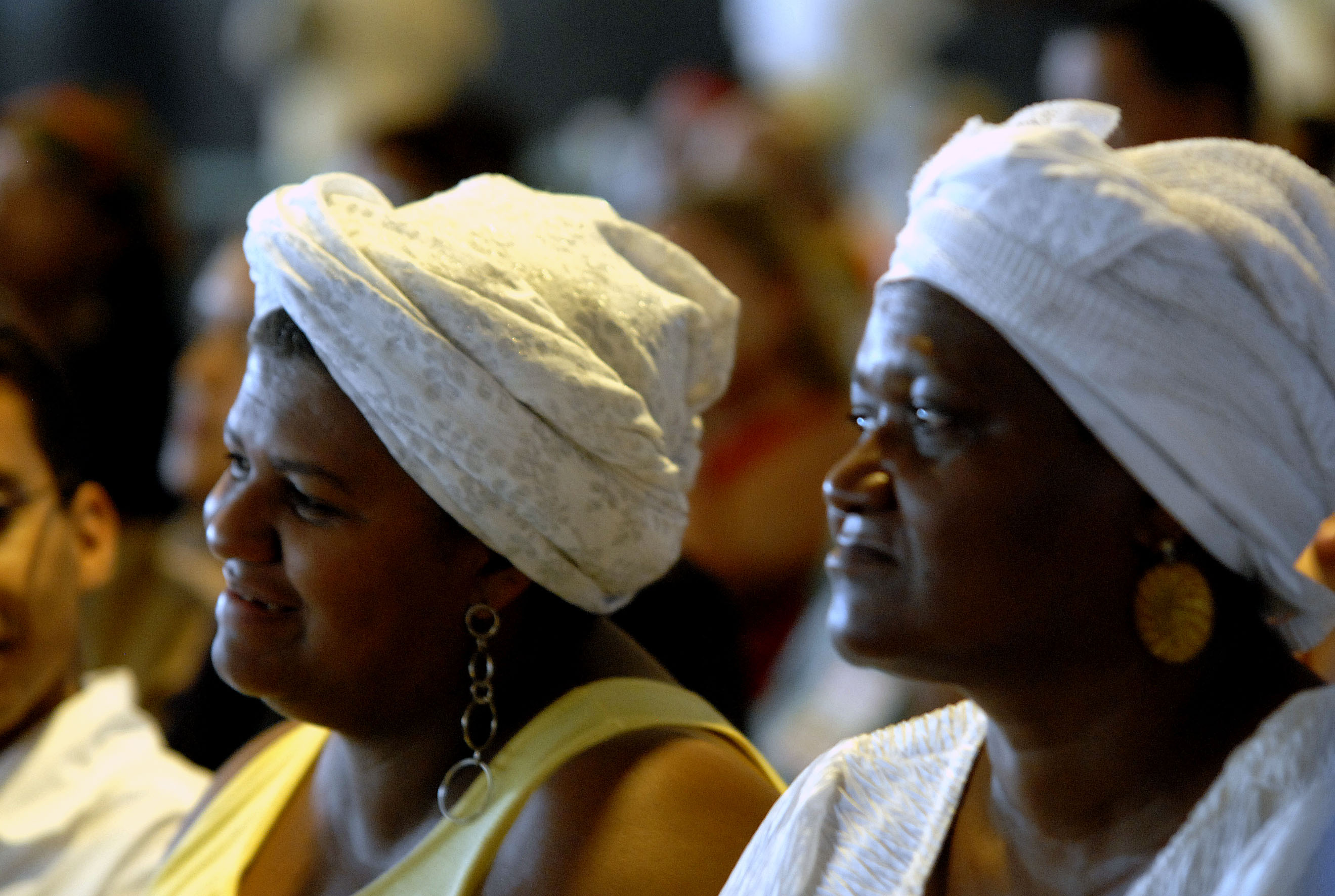
Brazilian Quilombolas during a meeting in the capital of Brazil, Brasília

A Quilombola (Portuguese pronunciation: [kilõˈbɔlɐ]) is an Afro-Brazilian resident of quilombo settlements first established by left behind and escaped enslaved people in Brazil. They are the descendants of Enslaved Afro-Brazilians who fled from slave plantations or stay in abandoned lands that existed in Brazil until abolition in 1888. The most famous quilombola was Zumbi and the most famous quilombo was Palmares. Many quilombolas live in poverty.

== History ==
In the 16th century, slavery was becoming common across the Americas, particularly in Brazil. Africans were kidnapped and shipped across the Atlantic via the Trans-Atlantic slave trade. In Brazil, most worked on sugar plantations and mines, and were brutally tortured. Some enslaved people were able to escape. According to oral tradition, among them was Aqualtune, a former Angolan princess and general enslaved during a Congolese war. Shortly after reaching Brazil, the pregnant Aqualtune escaped with some of her soldiers and fled to the Serra da Bariga region. It was here that Aqualtune founded a quilombo, or a colony of Quilombolas, called Palmares. Palmares was one of the largest quilombos in Brazil.

=== Palmares ===
In the 1630s, Palmares was inherited by Aqualtune's son, Ganga Zumba, who ruled the city from a palace. The inhabitants used African style forges to make metal plows and scythes to harvest fields of corn, rice and manioc and created agricultural forests of palm and breadfruit. Palmares and other quilombos during the quilombola's glory days were surrounded by palisades, camouflaged pits filled with deadly stakes, and paths lined with lacerating caltrops. Palmares was behind many raids of Portuguese ports and towns. Lisbon, seeing Palmares as a direct challenge to its colonial status, declared war on the Quilombolas. Twenty attacks on Palmares failed. But the constant attacks wore down Ganga Zumba, and in 1678 he agreed to stop accepting new enslaved people and move out of the mountains to safety. Ganga Zumba's nephew, Zumbi, saw this as betrayal and poisoned his uncle before tearing up the treaty with the Portuguese. Colonial forces continued the relentless attacks, and in the end Zumbi was unable to cope. In 1694, the Portuguese finally destroyed Palmares and killed hundreds of its citizens, ending the glory days of the Quilombolas. Zumbi and Palmares survived only as symbols of resistance.

=== Mola ===
The Mola quilombo consisted of approximately 300 formerly enslaved people and had a high degree of political, social and military organization. Felipa Maria Aranha was the first leader of the community. The group was also led by Maria Luiza Piriá. It was organised as a republic, with democratic voting in place. Over the course of the Mola quilombo's life, it expanded to include four other similar settlements in the region and was known as the Confederação do Itapocu. In 1895 there were still traces of the settlement to be seen; they have now disappeared. Historians, such as Benedita Pinto and Flávio Gomes, interpret the organisation of the group as an ideal model of resistance to slavery.

=== Other quilombola communities ===
Other quilombos emerged during the age of Palmares and the Aqualtune Dynasty. Fleeing enslaved peoples befriended and allied with Brazilian Indigenous peoples. Today most of the quilombola population is of mixed African-Brazilian and Indigenous ancestry. Quilombos were mainly located deep in the jungles, far from European influence, and after the fall of Palmares, all the Quilombolas either went into hiding or were wiped out by Europeans. Most of the Quilombolas remained hidden so successfully it was assumed they had been destroyed or died out. They dropped farming at the risk of being discovered and continued the agricultural forest practice. The Quilombolas adopted a lifestyle that was a cross of Portuguese and various Indigenous and African cultures.

== Quilombola land rights ==
=== Prior to 1988 ===
Until the 1970s, the Quilombolas were mostly unknown internationally and assumed to have been entirely killed off. In 1970s, deforestation reached their lands. Loggers, assuming them to be squatters trying to steal property, forced them off their land at gunpoint and stole their land. They were not recognized as surviving quilombola peoples until the 1980s. Enraged ranchers claimed they were squatters pretending to be Quilombolas to get land. Eventually, they were accepted as Quilombolas, but ranchers still kept stealing their land. The most avid supporter of the Quilombolas was Chico Mendes, who argued for the preservation of the jungle and its Indigenous Peoples, including the Quilombolas.

=== 1988–2003 ===
In 1988, the current Constitution of Brazil, which included the collective rights of indigenous and quilombola communities to their traditional lands within Article 68 of the constitution's Temporary Constitutional Provisions Act (ADCT), came into force, with the text: "Final ownership shall be recognized for the remaining members of the ancient runaway slave communities who are occupying their lands and the State shall grant them the respective title deeds".

Despite this, it was not until 1995 when INCRA drafted Ordinance nº 307/1995, which laid out a formal legal framework for regulations for the titling of quilombo lands, and the Palmares Cultural Foundation began registration of quilombola communities, that the formal process of recognition of quilombo remnant communities and awarding of title began. Quilombo Boa Vista, located in Oriximiná, Pará, became the first quilombo territory to receive its land title from INCRA under the ordinance on November 20, 1995. However, the ordinance only applied to federally-owned lands, and activists for the quilombo remnant sector experienced greater support from state governments. In 1999, administration of the titling process was transferred to the PCF, which issued its own directive in 2000 for administering the process.

In 2001, President Fernando Henrique Cardoso signed Decree 3.192/2001, which formally empowered the PCF to identify and demarcate quilombola communities but also extended the Milestone thesis to quilombola communities, requiring them to prove that they had maintained ownership of their claimed lands continuously from 1888, when the Lei Áurea was passed, to 1988, when the current constitution came into force. This threshold excluded a large number of territorial claims by quilombola communities.

=== 2003–2018 ===
In 2003, President Lula signed Decree 4.887/2003, which recognized the inalienable rights of Quilombo communities and their claims to the land they inhabited, repealed the milestone thesis' application to quilombos, and transferred the titling process back to INCRA. The decree detailed the processes of titling and demarcation of the Quilombo land. Right wing opponents filed a lawsuit which suggested that Lula's decree was unconstitutional. The ruling on the case was postponed for over 3 years, which resulted in President Temer suspending all new titles and demarcations of the lands until a ruling was made on the constitutionality of the decree. On February 8, 2018, the Brazilian Supreme Court (STF) rejected the legal action and voted in favor of Lula's decree.

Approximately forty percent of the twelve million Africans imported to the Americas to be enslaved landed in Brazil in the late 16th century. Many enslaved Afro-Brazilians escaped bondage by running away and occupying land which led to the creation of Quilombos. Those who live in these autonomous communities are referred to as Quilombolas and for many years many Quilombolas have been struggling to keep and earn titles to their land in the face of modernization, gentrification, and oppressive regimes in Brazil.

Legally, the Quilombolas were granted rights to their land in 1988 as the Brazilian Constitution acknowledged these communities and stated:

The definitive property rights of remanescentes ["remnants"] of quilombos that have been occupying the same lands are hereby recognized, and the state shall grant them title to such lands.

Without land titles, the Quilombolas do not have access to social benefits, such as subsidized housing. But threats are also looming from illegal loggers and gold miners encroaching on quilombola land, activists have said.

On March 3, 2018, Simão Jatene, the governor of Pará, signed a document giving land titles for more than 220,000 hectares of Amazon forest to an isolated community populated by descendants of enslaved people who escaped centuries ago.

=== 2019–2022 ===
The election of Jair Bolsonaro signaled a reversal of policy regarding Quilombolas. President Bolsonaro had said: "They [Quilombolas] don't do anything! I don't think they even serve for procreation anymore." In 2017, during a speech at the Hebraica club, Bolsonaro stated: "If I [become president], there won't be any money for NGOs ... You will not have a centimeter demarcated for indigenous reserves or Quilombolas."

Under Sergio Camargo, a conservative activist appointed by Bolsonaro as chair, the Palmares Cultural Foundation issued far fewer certifications of quilombola communities and territories.

=== 2023–present ===
The policy of Bolsonaro on quilombola land rights was reversed by Lula upon his return to the presidency. Lula appointed activist João Jorge Rodriguês as chair of the FCP, with over 100 certifications being issued to quilombola community claimants in 2023 and 31 in 2024. In addition, Lula signed several executive orders expanding upon the quilombola policy:

- On 21 March 2023, he signed Decree 11,447/2023, establishing the Aquilomba Brasil program under the Ministry of Racial Equality to coordinate intersectoral policies to guarantee the rights of the quilombola population.
- on 20 November 2023 (Black Awareness Day), Lula signed Decree 11.786/2023, creating the National Quilombola Territorial and Environmental Management Policy (PNGTAQ), which seeks to standardize federal policies on territorial, environmental and cultural self-management of quilombola territories.
- On 9 September 2024, Lula signed decree nº 12.171/2024, creating the Directorate of Quilombola Territories within INCRA in order to expedite approval of quilombola territory application processes.

In addition, the Ministry of Racial Equality established the Secretariat of Policies for Quilombolas, Traditional Peoples and Communities of African Origin, Terreiro Peoples and Gypsies (SQPT).

=== Area and demographics ===
According to Sue Branford and Maurício Torres, only 219 of the 2,926 Quilombos had land titles as of 2018. Afro-Brazilians (only a small minority of whom are Quilombo residents) number around 15 million and as a group are among poorest in Brazil, with a poverty rate of around 75 percent among Quilombolas, compared to 25.4 percent in the general population, government data shows. Quilombola land titles are recognized in 21 out of 27 federative units, with none yet being recognized in Acre, Amazonas, Espírito Santo, Mato Grosso, Roraima or the Federal District.

=== Opposition and challenges ===
Though quilombola land rights are secured by the STF for now, the communities still face many obstacles today, like the constitutional amendment PEC 215, which has often been proposed in Congress. Currently, the executive branch in Brazil has power to demarcate quilombola territories. PEC 215, if passed, would have given Congress exclusive authority to oversee demarcation of indigenous land. The constitutional amendment would also give Congress power over land which has already been approved for demarcation. PEC 215 could potentially take away land titles from 219 Quilombolas.

== 1988 Constitution: Article 68 ==
The national black movement and the black rural communities in the northern regions of Pará and Maranhão gathered political momentum throughout the 1980s and succeeded in having quilombola land rights introduced into the 1988 Constitution in the form of Article 68. Regional and national organisations working to fight racial discrimination formed an alliance in 1986 that played an important role in the grassroots political action that resulted in Article 68. Black militants across Brazil demanded reparation and the recognition of the detrimental effects of slavery, including preventing black communities from accessing land. The Black Movement explicitly decided to make land central to their political agenda during the constitutional debates. They capitalised on the perception that there were very few quilombos and that it would thus be mainly a symbolic gesture in order to get it into the Constitution. It was assumed that any community would have to prove its direct descent from a runaway enslaved peoples settlement.

Black federal representative Benedita da Silva was the main proponent in Congress of the inclusion of quilombo land rights in the new Constitution, which was drawn up after Brazil's military dictatorship ended in 1986. Article 68 stated that "definitive ownership will be recognized, and the respective title will be issued by the State, to those descendants of the maroon communities occupying their lands." Quilombo members cannot be legally evicted, except by the federal government (which has challenged at least two certified quilombos: Rio dos Macacos whose claims overlapped a Navy base and Alcântara where a space station has been built). The inclusion of quilombo communities in the Constitution was the first recognisable government action towards the reparation of historical injustice against enslaved descendants.

== Redefinition - 2003 ==
Throughout the second half of the 1990s and the early 2000s, hundreds of black peasant communities in Brazil began the legal process for official recognition. Despite a government attempt in 1999 to restrict the application of Article 68, there was increasing black rural mobilisation and growing criticism of the categorisation of rural black communities solely as the result of colonial social relations. In 2003, the government of President Luiz Inácio "Lula" da Silva issued Presidential Decree 4887 that categorized quilombo descendants as "self-designated ethno-racial groups who have their own historical trajectory, specific territorial relations, and a presumed black ancestry related to the historical oppression they have suffered". Through the political pressure exerted by black peasants throughout Brazil, the government established explicitly that quilombos should be defined by their being communities formed by black peasants in general, part of the present agrarian structure and contemporary society, not only by their relation to the past as runaway-descendants.

As of 2016, 294 villages have applied to be recognized as quilombos, because they were founded by escaped enslaved peoples and are mainly inhabited by their descendants. The certification process thus far has been slow, and 152 villages have been recognized as quilombos.

== 2022 census ==
The 2022 Brazilian census was the first to include questions asking citizens about quilombola identity and status, despite the posture of the incumbent Bolsonaro administration toward Quilombolas. It counted 1,327,802 people, or 0.65% of the total population of Brazil, as Quilombolas, 68.19% (or 905,415 people) of whom lived in the Northeast region. It also counted only 167,202 Quilombolas, or 4.3% of the national quilombola population, as living in officially delimited quilombola territories.

== See also ==
- Maroons
- Quilombo
