= Paulinho Paiakan =

Brazilian indigenous leader (1955- 2020)

Paulinho Paiakan (1955 – 16 June 2020) was a leader of the Kayapo people, an indigenous tribe of Brazil. He led the Kayapo in their protests against the destruction of the Amazon rainforest.

== Background ==
Paiakan was hired by the Brazilian government in 1971 to facilitate the construction of the Trans-Amazonian highway system through Kayapo lands. Once Paiakan saw the nature of the project first hand, he quit his job and began to mobilize his people against the project. He formed a splinter group from his home village and settled in a new village named Aukre, where he set out to document the destruction of the rainforest and the Kayapo traditions.

Paiakan became known on the world stage, touring Europe and North America with public appearances and speaking engagements, sponsored by Friends of the Earth, the World Wildlife Fund and the Kayapo Support Group of Chicago in a campaign against the Altamira Dam project. Speaking at the University of Chicago, he said:

The forest is one big thing; it has people, animals, and plants. There is no point saving the animals if the forest is burned down; there is no point saving the forest if the people and animals who live in it are killed or driven away. The groups trying to save the races of animals cannot win if the people trying to save the forest lose; the people trying to save the Indians cannot win if either of the others lose; the Indians cannot win without the support of these groups; but the groups cannot win either without the support of the Indians, who know the forest and the animals and can tell what is happening to them. No one of us is strong enough to win alone; together, we can be strong enough to win.

The World Bank announced that it would not grant Brazil a loan for the project following this campaign and the subsequent protest at Altamira.

== Rape charge and subsequent trial ==
In 1992, Paiakan was accused of raping a young white woman whom he had hired to tutor his children. He was accused of biting off the nipples and inserting both hands in the woman's vagina, among other things. In 1994, Paiakan was acquitted, but in a 1999 retrial, he was convicted and sentenced to six years in prison. The entire affair stigmatized not only Paiakan, but the entire indigenous peoples' movement of which he had been such a key figure.

== Personal life and death ==
Paiakan was the brother of activist Tuíre Kayapó and the father of aspiring politician Maial Panhpunu Paiakan.

Paiakan died on 16 June 2020, at the Hospital Público Regional do Araguaia in Redenção, Pará, from COVID-19 during the COVID-19 pandemic in Brazil. He was around 65 years old at the time of his death. He worked closely with another Brazilian COVID-19 victim, Missias Kokama.
