= Menkragnoti Indigenous Territory =

Indigenous territory in Mato Grosso and Pará, Brazil

Terra Indigena Menkragnoti is an indigenous territory created in 1994 in the state of Pará (as part of municipalities of Altamira and São Félix do Xingu) and in Mato Grosso (municipalities of Matupá and Peixoto de Azevedo), Brazil. It is home to the Menkragnoti tribe, which belongs to the Kayapo nation. It has a total population of 626 people living in 4,914,254.82 hectares (12,143,388.1 acres). The Terra Indigena is also home to an unknown number of isolated Mengra Mrari Indians. TI Menkragnoti is adjacent to Terra Indigena Kaiapo and TI Bau. It forms the most important nature conservancy unit in Para.

== Uncontacted peoples ==
There are three bands of uncontacted people living within the territory. The presence of the first group (a subgroup of the Mengra Mrari tribe) was confirmed long back. The other two bands are Capot/Nhinore and Iriri Novo (named after the locations).
