= Santana Indigenous Territory =

Indigenous territory in Brazil

- Terra Indígena Santana
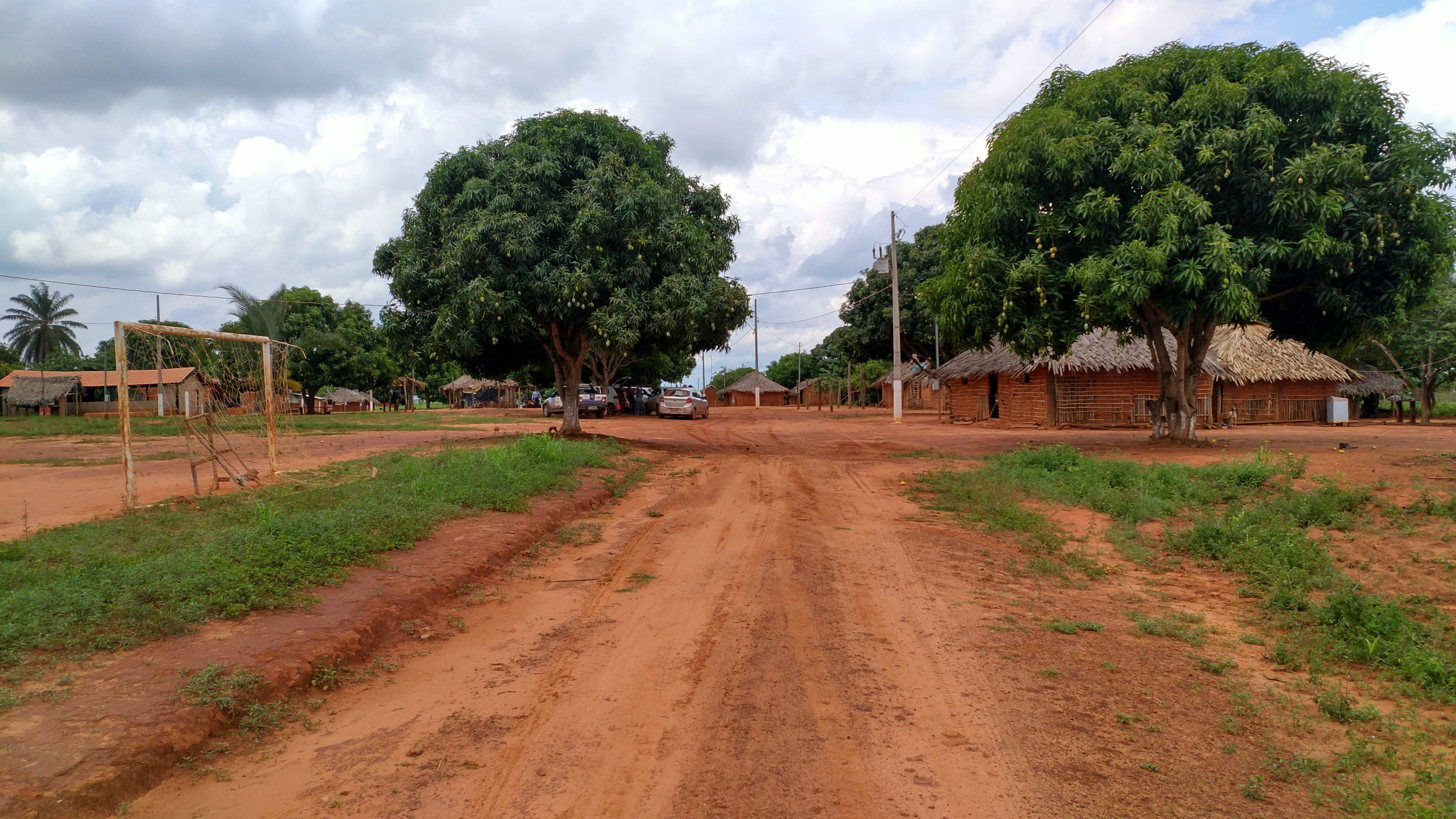
- Nova Canaã, one of the villages in the Santana Indigenous Territory.

- Location within Brazil
- Location: Mato Grosso
- Coordinates: 14°03′41″S 55°42′18″W
- Designation: Indigenous territory

Santana is an indigenous territory located approximately 140 km from municípality of Nobres, in the central state of Mato Grosso.

== History ==
The Bakairis of Rio Novo, as recorded by ethnographer Karl von den Steinen in 1884, were already present in the region where the Santana indigenous land is currently located. This Bakairi group, in time immemorial, dispersed from the other Bakairi heading towards the headwaters of the Arinos River. The same group was the first to be contacted by non-indigenous people, consequently the first to suffer the consequences of colonization. Regarding this, Steinen reports evidence of socio-cultural impacts on the way of life of the Bakairi of Rio Novo, in the years 1884: “The little people led an idyllic life. He took care of cattle and crops, went hunting, planted cassava, beans, corn, rice, some tobacco and sugar. They were civilized, despite their pierced ears and nasal septum (...) Everyone understood, at least, crumbs of Portuguese”.

The first outstanding leader among the Bakairi was known as Captain Reginaldo I'elu, who had the following information "...always showed interest in the German expeditionary's notes, and he also had the admirable quality of an easy apprehension, expressing clearly, in Portuguese, although rude." Still about Captain Reginaldo, it is known that he was mainly responsible for the first demarcation of the Bakairi Indigenous Area, which occurred in 1905, through Act nº 362, of 24 April/1905 on the initiative of the State Government.

The creation of the Santana Indigenous Post, which took place in 1965, was a demand of the Bakairis of Rio Novo themselves, as a way of securing part of the traditional territory, through the Indian Protection Service, as it was being invaded by farmers.

And so, the Kurâ Bakairi people of Rio Novo have witnessed changes over the last 3 centuries. The Santana village is the mother village of the other villages that currently exist in the territory of the Santana Indigenous Territory, namely Aldeia Nova Canaã and Aldeia Quilombo (Igu Iâ'o).
