= Tenondé Porã Indigenous Territory =

Indigenous territory in São Paulo, Brazil

Tenondé Porã is an indigenous territory of the Mbyá Guaraní people which occupies an area of 15,969 hectares, in the municipalities of São Paulo (in the districts of Parelheiros and Marsilac, South Zone), São Bernardo do Campo, São Vicente and Mongaguá, with an estimated population of 1,175 people in 2015 by Instituto Socioambiental

== Villages ==
The indigenous territory is composed of the following villages:

- Guyrapaju
- Kalipety
- Kuaray Rexakã
- Yyrexakã
- Karumbe'y
- Pai Matias
- Venturaoikoa
