= PEC 215 =

Proposed constitutional amendment to the constitution of Brazil

PEC 215/2000
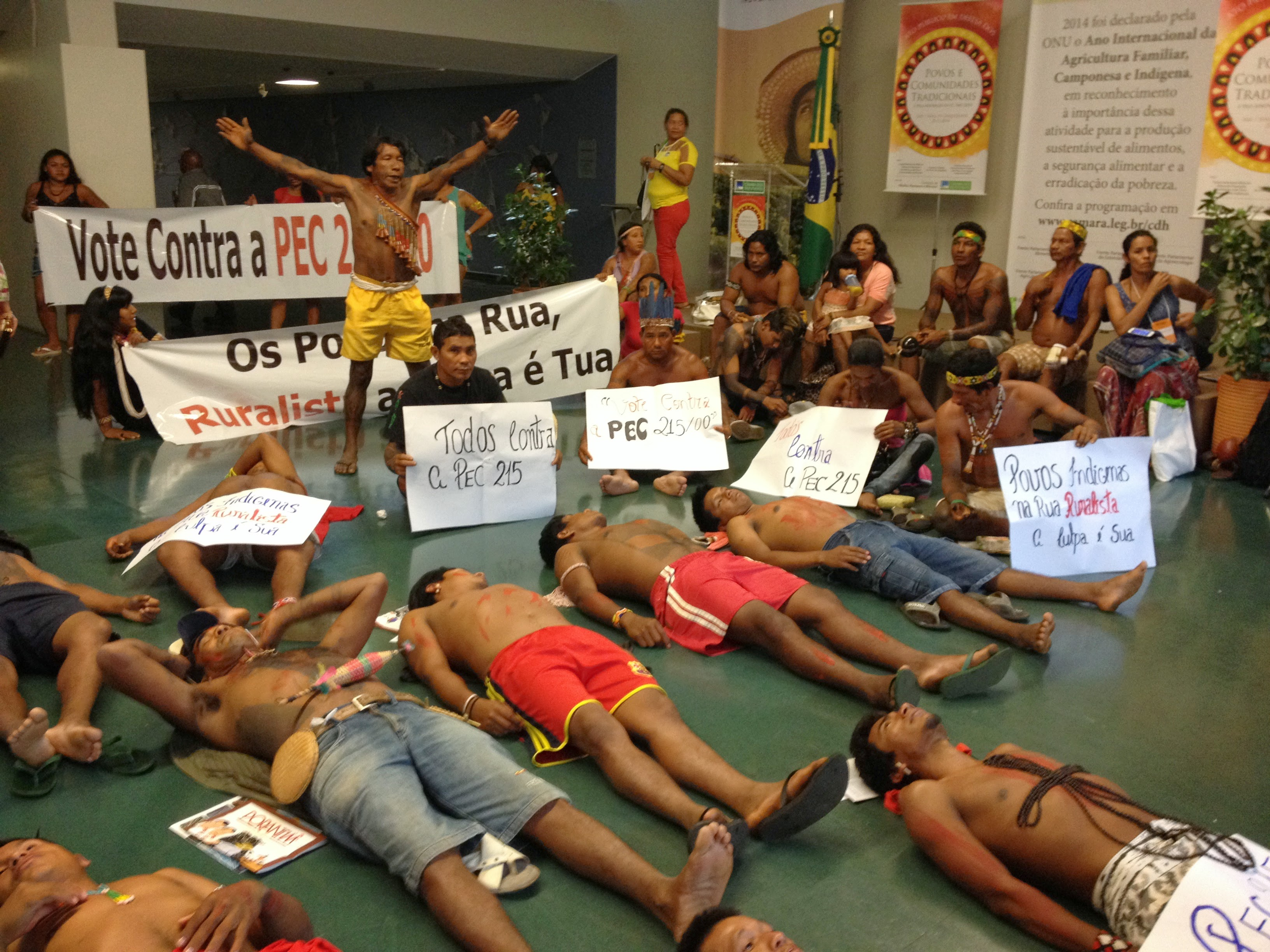
- Indigenous people protesting against PEC 215

Brazilian National Congress
- Long title: Adds Section XVIII to Article 49; modifies § 4th and adds § 8th, both in Article 231 of the Federal Constitution.
- Citation: PEC 215/2000
- Territorial extent: Whole of Brazil
- Considered by: Chamber of Deputies

Legislative history
- Bill title: Constitutional Amendment Bill no. 215 of 2000
- Bill citation: PEC 215/2000
- Introduced by: Dep. Almir Sá
- Introduced: 28 March 2000
- Committee responsible: Constitution, Justice and Citizenship; Special Commission - PEC 215/00
- First reading: 28 March 2000

Keywords
- Indigenous peoples in Brazil
- Status: Not passed

PEC 215 is a proposed constitutional amendment to the constitution of Brazil.

It intends to delegate exclusively to Congress the duty of demarcation of indigenous and Quilombola territories, as well as the ratification of land already approved. It would prohibit the expansion of already existing indigenous areas. One of the proposal sections provides compensation of the Union to farmers who have properties absorbed by areas demarcated as indigenous land. The Federal Constitution considers that indigenous lands belong to the Union and, therefore, there is no compensation to those who lose the ownership of the territory when the demarcation is recognized.

Currently, the government and Funai are responsible for demarcation. Under the proposed amendment, indigenous people might only be able to claim an area, they have lived in and used by 1988. It would give Congress the final say on new demarcations, a fact that displeases the indigenous leaders because of the strength of lobbyists. Much of the protected area of indigenous lands and quilombola territories are rain forests being important for water and climate. There are farmers, who have filed an appeal.

== Legislative process ==
Approval of the bill depends on two rounds of voting in the plenary sessions of the Chamber of Deputies and the Federal Senate, with qualified quorum, that is, with the votes of at least 308 deputies and 49 senators. Parliamentarians opposed to the bill have said they will question its constitutionality in the Supreme Court. The bill needs three fifths of the votes in senate to be approved.

PEC 215 has been proposed in repeated sessions of Congress since 2000, and has been approved in several congressional committee votes. Members of the Chamber of Deputies of PT, PCdoB, PV, PSOL and REDE have advocated against the bill.

Great land owners have a great impact in congress. Protests by indigenous people prevented a vote on PEC 215 in 2014. Indigenous people have protested against the bill in front of the Chamber of Deputies.
