= Macuxi =

Scientific classification
- Kingdom: Animalia
- Phylum: Arthropoda
- Class: Insecta
- Order: Ephemeroptera
- Family: Baetidae
- Genus: Macuxi; Cruz, Salles, Hamada & Falcão, 2020
- Species: M. tunamore

Binomial name
- Macuxi tunamore Cruz, Salles, Hamada & Falcão, 2020

Genus of mayflies

Macuxi is a genus of mayflies in the family Baetidae, currently containing the single species Macuxi tunamore Cruz, Salles, Hamada & Falcão, 2020, from the Roraima region of Brazil.
