= Kayapó Indigenous Territory =

Indigenous territory in Pará, Brazil

- Terra Indígena Kayapó
- Location within Brazil
- Coordinates: 7°40′48″S 51°52′08″W
- Area: 3,284,000 ha (12,680 sq mi)
- Designation: Indigenous territory
- Created: 29 October 1991
- Administrator: FUNAI

The Kayapó Indigenous Territory (Portuguese: Terra Indígena Kayapó) is an indigenous territory located in Pará, Brazil.

== Location ==
The Kayapó Indigenous Territory has an area of 32,840 square kilometres (12,680 sq mi). It is inhabited by the Kayapó people. As of 1990 Funai reported that the population was 1,946. In 2014 Siasi/Sesai reported that the population was 4,548.

== History ==
The Kayapó Indigenous Territory was declared by decree 92.244 of 9 May 1985. The homologation was by decree 316 of 29 October 1991.

== Sources ==
- Terra Indígena Kayapó (in Portuguese), ISA: Instituto Socioambiental
