= Kayapo =

Indigenous people in Brazil

Mebêngôkre Kayapó
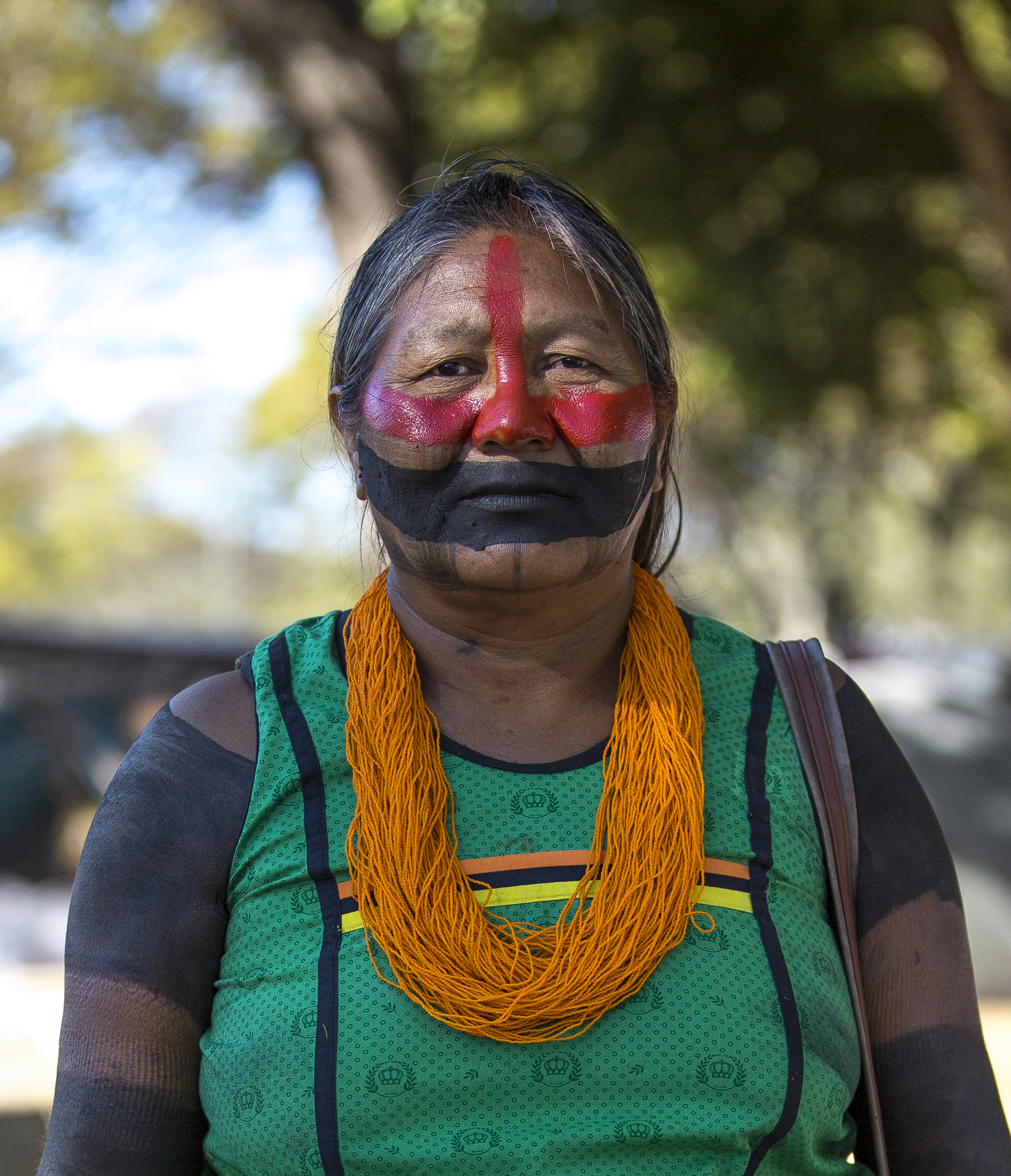
- Former Kayapó chief Tuíre Kayapó

Total population
- 8,638 (2010)

Regions with significant populations
- Brazil (Mato Grosso, Pará)

Languages
- Kayapo language

The Kayapo (Portuguese: Caiapó [kajaˈpɔ]) people are an Indigenous people in Brazil, living over a vast area across the states of Pará and Mato Grosso, south of the Amazon River and along the Xingu River and its tributaries. This location has given rise to the tribe's nickname of "the Xingu". They are one of the various subgroups of the great Mebêngôkre nation (meaning "people from the water's source"). The name Kayapo is used by neighboring groups rather than referring by the Kayapo to themselves; they refer to outsiders as Poanjos.

A type of sweet potato/tuber forms an important part of the Kayapó diet, and is sometimes named "caiapo", after the tribe. It is cultivated under that name in Japan, and has been found to decrease insulin resistance in type 2 diabetic patients.

== History ==
In the 18th century, in the northeastern region of the present state of São Paulo, the Kayapó tribe first encountered Portuguese-Brazilian bandeirantes, who were looking for gold, among other precious stones and metals, as well as indigenous slaves. As a result, the Kayapó left the area and migrated to the west.

In the 1950s and 1960s, the Brazilian government contacted the "warlike" Kayapós with the intention of making peace with them. As a result, most Kayapós are currently in contact with and aware of modern Brazilian society.

== Location ==
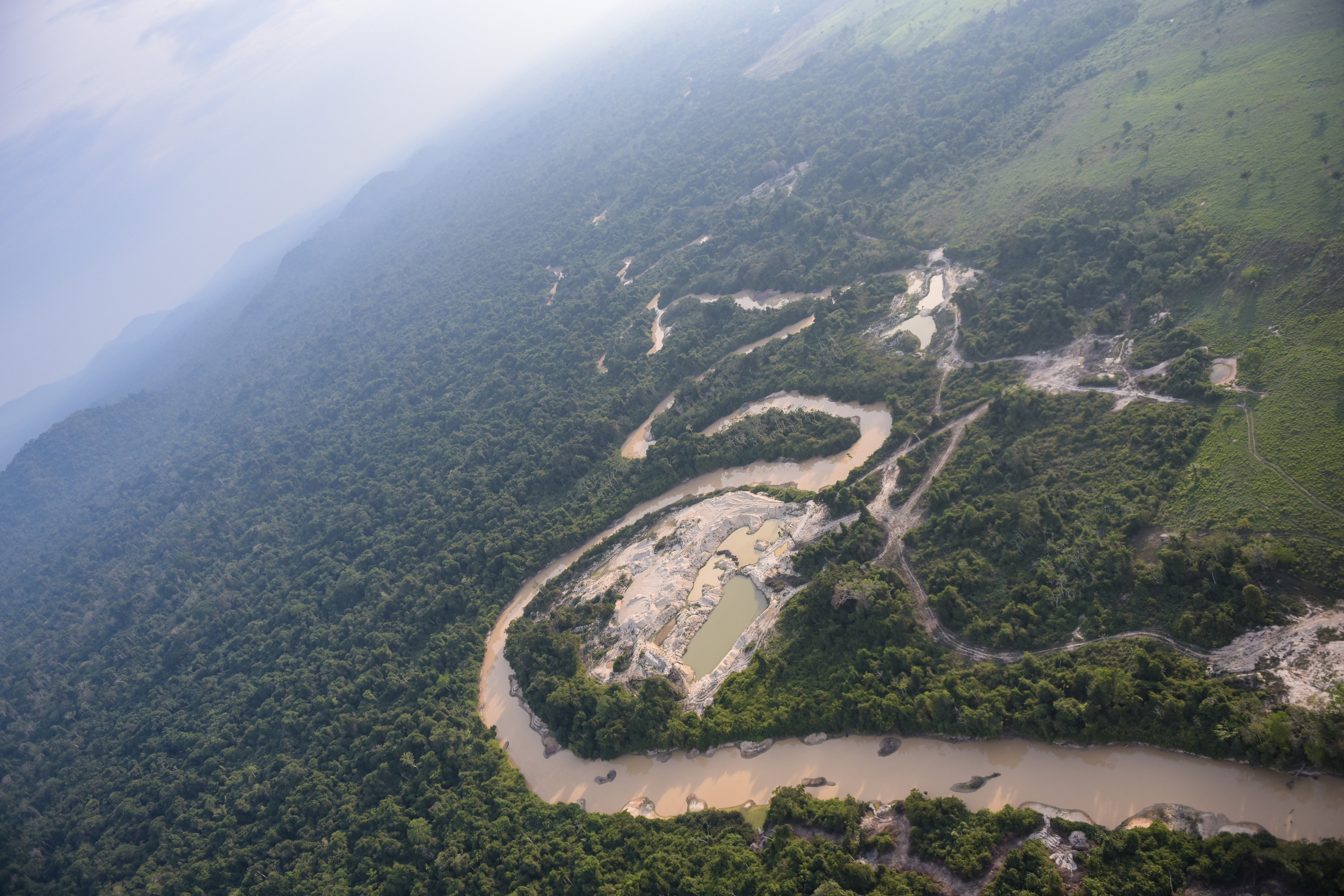
Kayapó Indigenous Territory

The Kayapo tribe lives alongside the Xingu River in the most east part of the Amazon rainforest, in the Amazon basin, in several scattered villages ranging in population from one hundred to one thousand people in Brazil. Their land consists of tropical rainforest savannah (grassland) and is arguably the largest tropical protected area in the entire world, covering 11,346,326 hectares (28,037,380 acres) of Neotropical forests and scrubland containing many endangered species. They have small hills scattered around their land and the area is criss-crossed by river valleys. The larger rivers feed into numerous pools and creeks, most of which lack official names.

In 2018, there was an estimated 8,638 Kayapo people, which is an increase from 7,096 in 2003. Subgroups of the Kayapo include the Xikrin, Gorotire, Mekranoti, and Metyktire. Their villages typically consist of a dozen huts. A centrally located hut serves as a meeting place for village men to discuss community issues.

== Name ==
The term Kayapo, also spelled Caiapó or Kaiapó, came from neighboring peoples in the early 19th century and means "those who look like monkeys". This name is probably based on a Kayapó men's ritual involving monkey masks. The autonym for one village is Mebêngôkre, which means "the men from the water hole." Other names for them include Gorotire, Kararaô, Kuben-Kran-Krên, Kôkraimôrô, Mekrãgnoti, Metyktire, and Xikrin.

== Culture ==
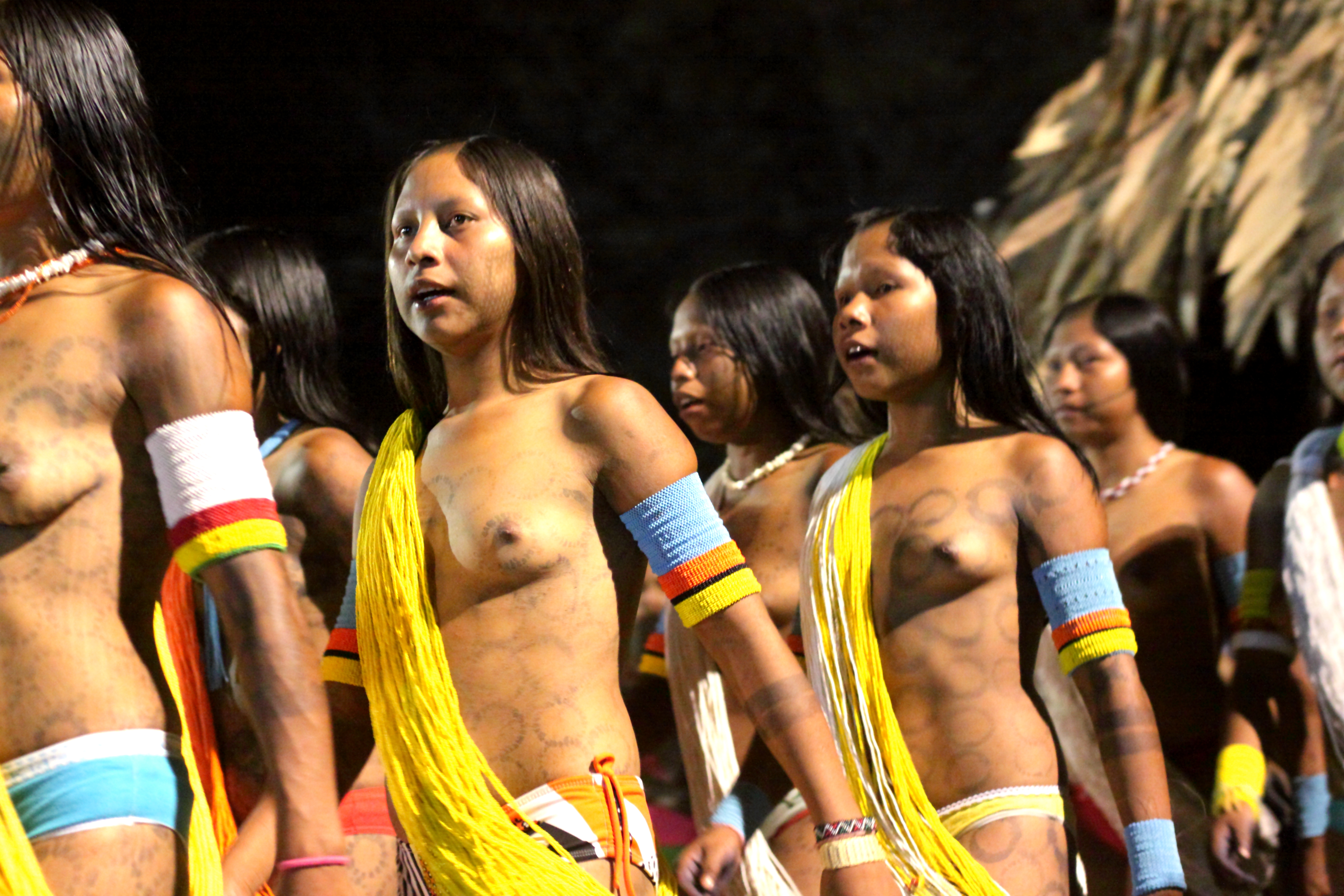
Kayapo women, Pará State, Brazil

The Kayapó often don intricate, black body painting covering their entire bodies, with unique designs and patterns to each person. They believe that their ancestors learned the ways of life from insects, so they paint their bodies to mimic the invertebrates and to better communicate with the great spirit that exists in all things. The black body paint also allows them to blend into their surroundings when hunting in the forests. To help find their way through the jungle, the Kayapó paint their legs with a red pigment that rubs-off on the surrounding plants as they traverse through the vegetation. The colors that a Kayapó wears are representative of their tribe's colors.

Older generations of Kayapó men wear wooden disks in their lower lips, but the practice is less common among younger Kayapó men. The men adorn themselves with radiating feather headbands, representing the universe. Kayapó men also can be seen with rope in their hair, to represent the rope with which the first Kayapó used to arrive from the sky. Traditionally, Kayapó men covered their lower bodies with sheaths. Due to increased contact with outside cultures, contemporary Kayapó often wear western-style clothing, such as shorts and pants. Kayapó chiefs wear headdresses made of bright, yellow feathers, to represent the rays of the sun. The feathers used in their headdresses are from birds native to their area, such as the hyacinth macaw and crested oropendola. The birds found in the Amazon are naturally bright-colored, thus the Kayapó do not dye the feathers. Kayapó children wear cloth or beaded bands with colors representing their tribes. Typically, these bands are tied below the waist or crisscrossed around the torso. When a child comes of age, they go through a naming-ceremony, in which they wear large yellow headdresses.

Kayapó women can be distinguished by the "V" formation shaved into their hair.

== Language ==
The Kayapo speak the Kayapo language, which belongs to the Jê language family. They are split into many groups, resulting in different dialects of their language. The Kayapo value oratory highly, calling themselves those who speak beautifully (Kaben mei) when compared to other indigenous groups. Beauty is valued highly in the Kayapo culture. A beautiful name is seen as a sign of wealth. The tribe will move and re-construct their camp in order to find the materials required to undertake the naming ceremony; eg. Sufficient food sources for celebration must be gathered and presented to the father of the newborn. During certain occasions, Kayapo men may speak as if someone is punching them in the stomach. The Kayapo possess varying knowledge of Portuguese, depending on the individual groups and their history of contact with outsiders.

== Land control and environmental issues ==
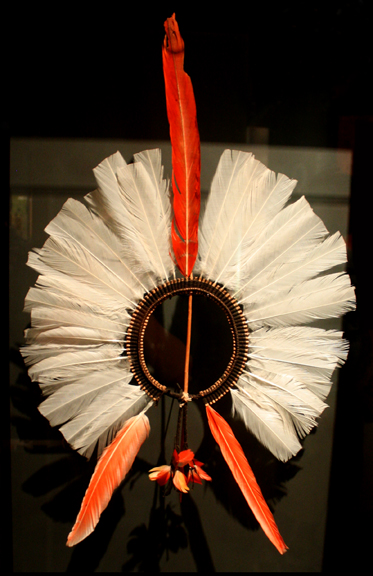
Kayapó headdress, or ákkápa-ri, c. 1910, National Museum of the American Indian

The Kayapo have incorporated a great deal of traditional myth, ritual and cosmology into their practices honoring the importance of the earth's relationship with the people. Threats to the forest home of the Kayapo have been an area of extreme concern in the last 30 years, beginning with mining and logging enterprises which threatened to destroy the rainforest, and thus the Kayapo's way of life. In the village of Gorotire, the Kayapo made a deal with prospectors that mining could take place as long as they received a percentage of the mining proceeds and had their territory demarcated. The gold mining operation was initially seen as a positive development, which brought money into the local economy. With money filtering into the economy, better housing, improved education and a resulting level of health were achieved. However, the initial benefits of mining also resulted in high levels of pollution in the area which seeped into water ways and nearby river banks and decimated local fish populations with high quantities of mercury. In addition to striking environmental threats, social habits began to change with the introduction of outside influences in the area. Men began to spend more time in town drinking, and engaging in "conspicuous consumption and womanising." This increased interaction with outside groups elevated the levels of disease, which posed an imminent threat to the people because of their relative seclusion and limited access to medical care. In addition, the diminishing resource base caused conflicts between the Kayapo and neighboring villages which often resulted in explosive and long standing disputes. The Kayapo people used forceful tactics to banish loggers and miners in some areas, as well as to establish themselves as an economic force. Developers ranging from gold miners to soy farmers and cattle ranchers were often killed.

In 1987, new land issues arose when the government proposed a series of hydroelectric dams to be built in the Xingu River area, namely the Belo Monte Dam. These dams were an imminent threat to the Kayapo with the potential to displace upwards of 20,000 people from their lands. Under the leadership of Paulinho Paiakan, the Altamira Gathering was orchestrated by the Kayapo, drawing media attention worldwide. This demonstration, staged at the planned site for the first dam in Altamira, Pará, lasted several days and brought much pressure upon both the World Bank and the Brazilian government. The Altamira gathering brought the Kayapo, as well as other Indigenous Brazilian Peoples and their supporters into a forum where discussion could be had about how to protect the environment and the native peoples. The Kayapo demanded information that was being withheld by the government relating to the negative consequences for their people who would be directly affected by the construction of the dam, as well as rural Brazilians in the Xingu River area, who they felt were not receiving adequate and fair information. The Kayapo continued to fight adversity and retaliated using traditional war oratory and dances, proving that they were not only capable of "effectively reintegrating their society, (but) also of adapting their organization and culture to manipulate the mass media that covered the demonstration". The Kayapo attended the meeting to protest the hydroelectric dam development whilst in traditional costume and wielding machetes. Perhaps "the most dramatic single image to emerge from this tumultuous gathering was that of Tuíra, a female indigenous leader, angrily waving a machete in the face of engineer José Antônio Muniz Lópes (later president of Eletronorte, the state power company in charge of the dam), which had worldwide repercussions and probably influenced further postponement of the project".

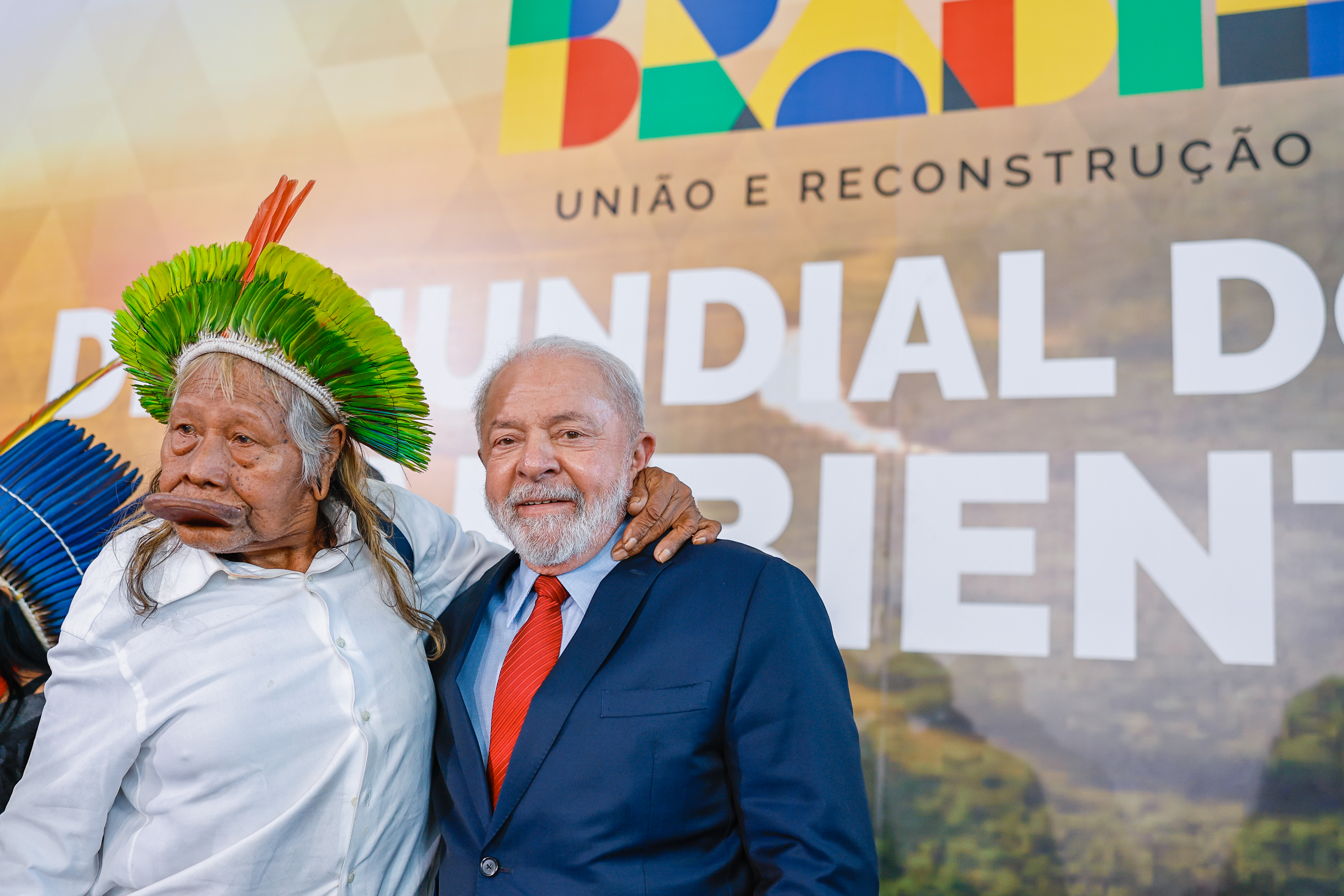
Kayapo chief Raoni Metuktire with Brazilian President Luiz Inácio Lula da Silva

An important media element of the presentations was the appearance of the rock star Sting during the demonstration. Sting continued to support the Kayapo in their efforts to protect their land, and in 1989 he founded the Rainforest Foundation Fund. Three years later, the first privately funded demarcation of the Brazilian indigenous reserve was made possible by the RFF. In 2008, they were again threatened by secretive government plans to build a series of hydroelectric dams on their land. The Belo Monte Dam resurfaced, and would be built on the Xingu River, the homeland to many Kayapo people. The construction plans continue to be fought by the Kayapo people. Government corruption continues to weaken the resistance efforts of the indigenous and opposition forces within the government. Kayapo leaders protesting the creation of the dam are constantly threatened, and some have been killed by developers and land prospectors. Because of the nature of the circumstances, these crimes are rarely punished.

The forest is the home of the Kayapo and they rely on its bounty for their food and medicinal needs. Rivers are essential to their way of life and gold mining in Brazil is polluting the rivers, while the proposed Belo Monte Dam project would use up vast amounts of resources essential to the survival and livelihood of the Kayapo and would severely impact fishing conditions. Between 18,000-25,000 (indirectly associated) jobs will be created by the construction of the dam. These numbers will have a vast and far reaching implication on population growth in the area which has the very real potential to put even more pressure on the fragile forest infrastructure and ever decreasing natural resource base, escalating concerns of flooding and deforestation in particular.

Conservation International Brazil began a conservation-and-development partnership with the Kayapó community of A’Ukre in 1992, aiming to reduce reliance on the sale of illegally logged mahogany and to protect an intact mahogany population on Kayapó lands, including maintaining an approximately 8,000-hectare area for research and protection.

== Botany and agriculture ==
External videos
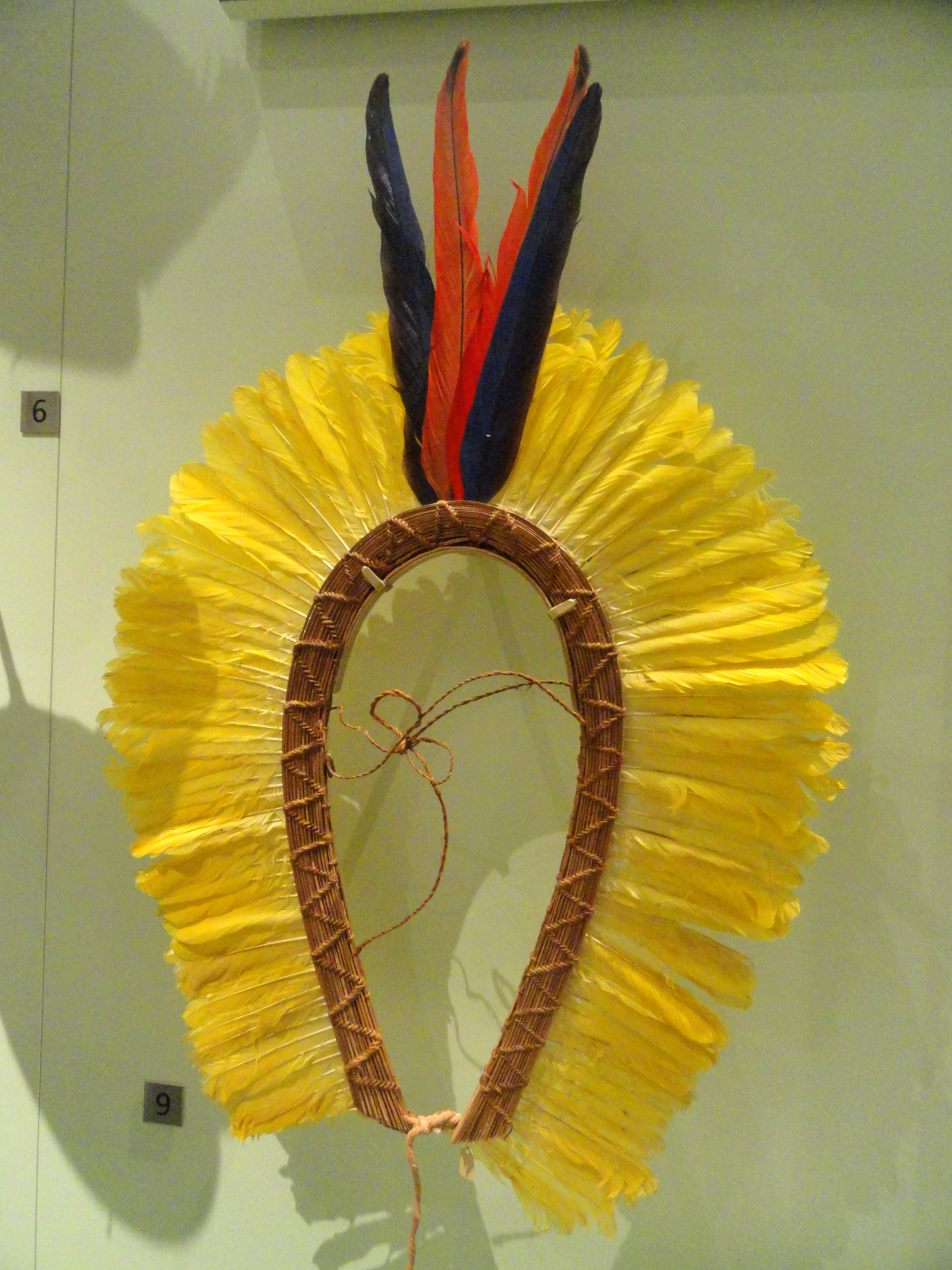
- Kayapó Headdress: a glimpse of life in the Amazon rainforest, Smarthistory at Khan Academy, (5:15), November 25, 2014

The resource patterns of the Kayapo are non-destructive to the resource base but require a very large area of land. The Kayapo people use shifting cultivation, a type of farming where land is cultivated for a few years, after which the people move to a new area. New farmland is cleared and the old farm is allowed to lie fallow and replenish itself. The particular type of shifting agriculture employed most frequently by the Kayapo is the slash and burn technique. This process allows forested areas to be cut down and burned in order for cultivation of the lands to take place. These "new fields" "peak in production of principal domesticated crops in two or three years but continue to reproduce for many years; e.g., sweet potatoes for four to five years, yams and taro for five to six years, manioc for four to six years, and papaya for five or more years". Old fields are important for their concentration of medicinal plants. With the spread of indigenous groups, trail-side plantings and "forest fields" were also used for cultivating crops. Trails systems were extensive in the area and were used for transporting and growing crops along their margins. The field system was done by utilizing either naturally occurring or man made clearings in the forest for crop cultivation which required little maintenance afterward. The Kayapo also cultivated "war gardens" which were hidden plots used as a resource in times of food scarcity.

The Kayapo use approximately 250 different food plants and 650 different medicinal plants that they find around their village.

They also have trade agreements with The Body Shop.

== See also ==
- Raoni Metuktire, Kayapo chief and environmentalist
- Terra preta, dark, fertile artificial soil found in the Amazon Basin
- The Kayapo: Out of the Forest
